= Gaza Envelope =

Areas of Israel within 7 km of the Gaza Strip

- Region in Israel
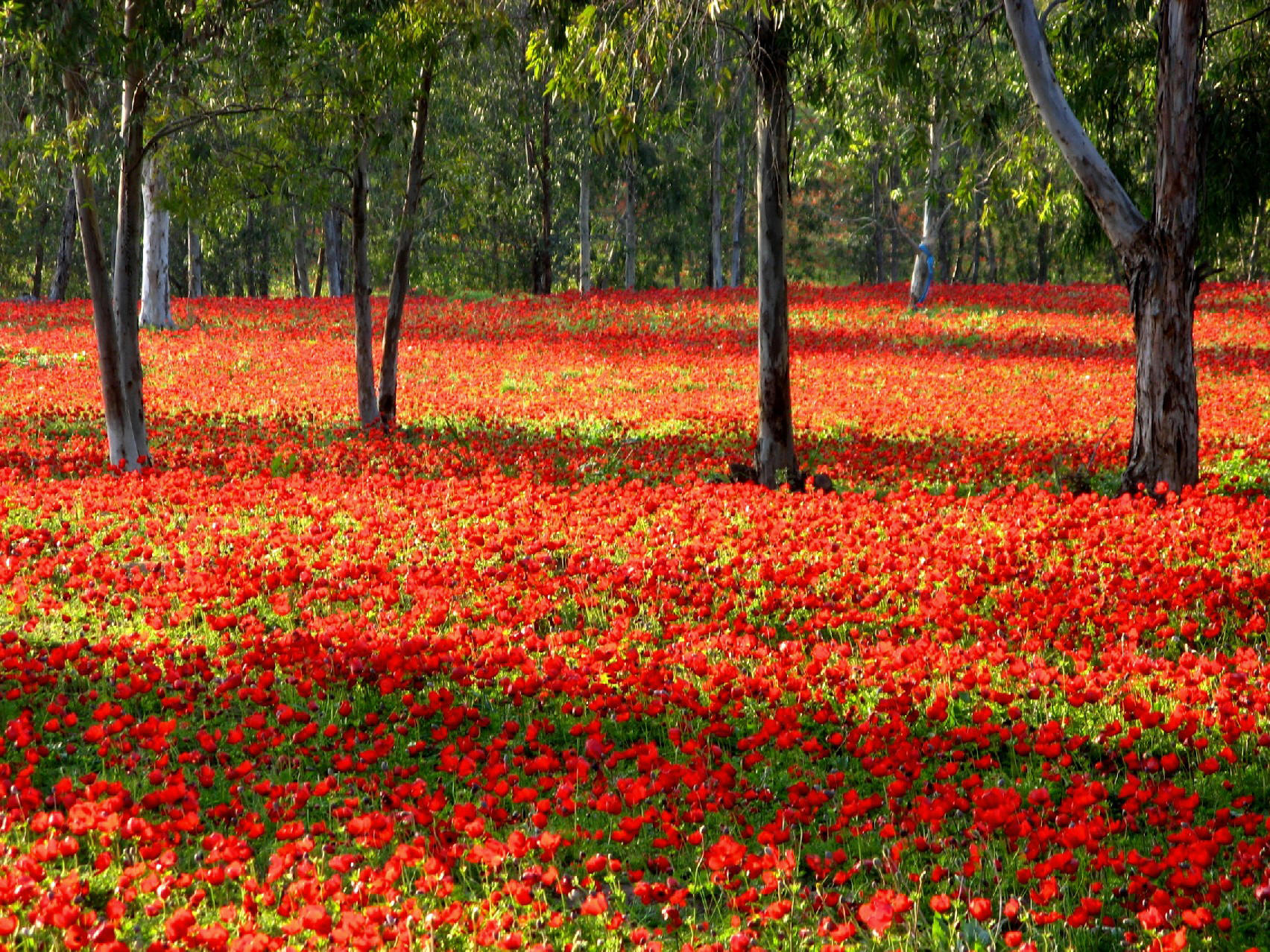
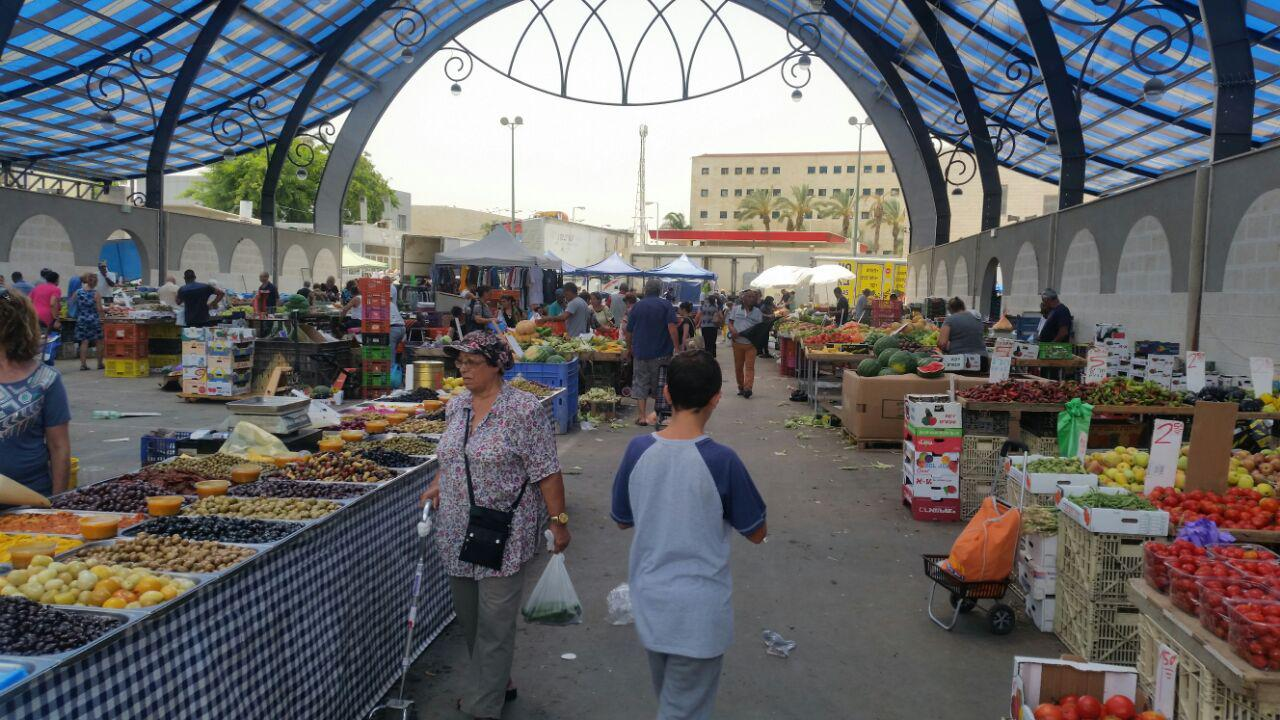
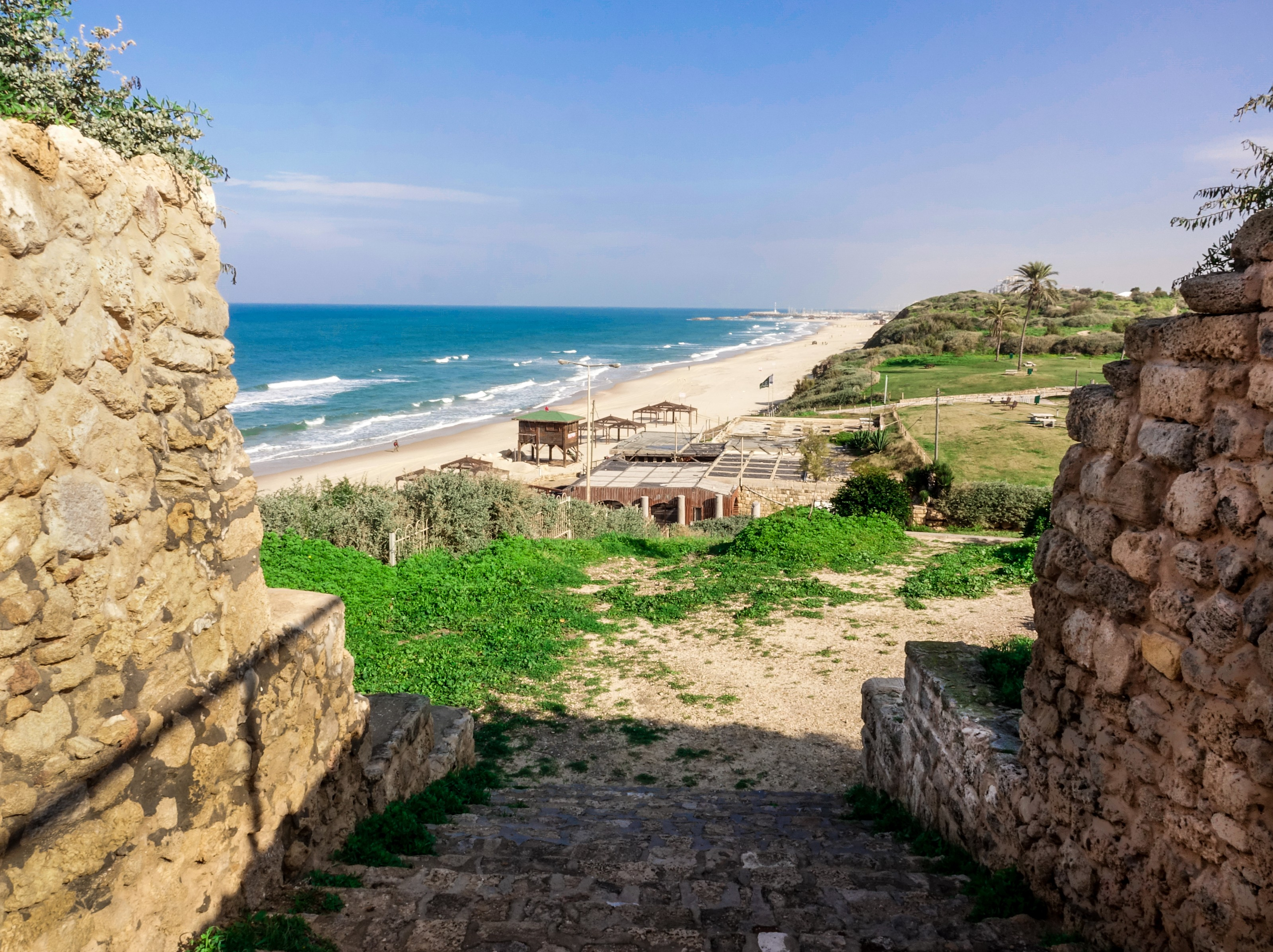
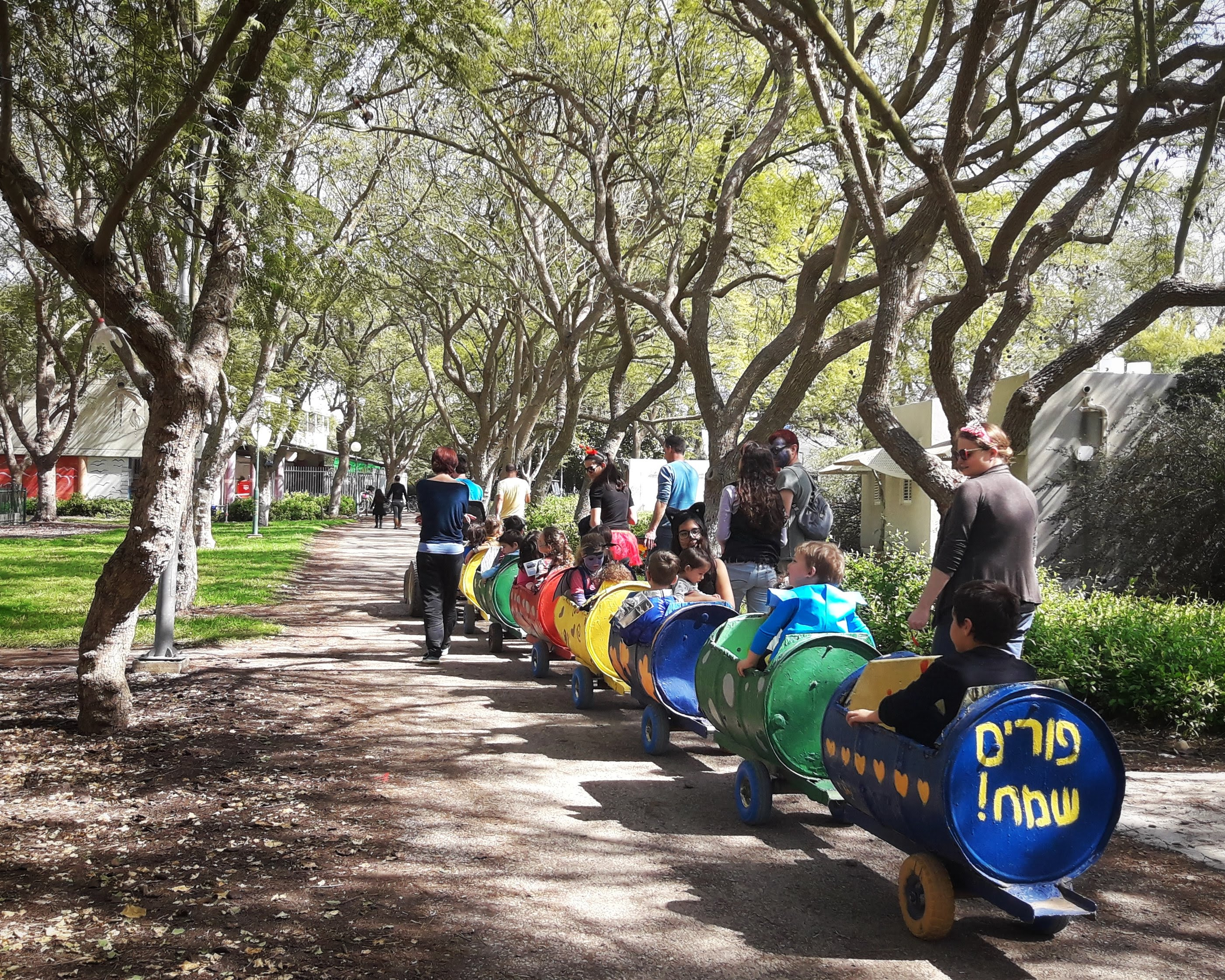
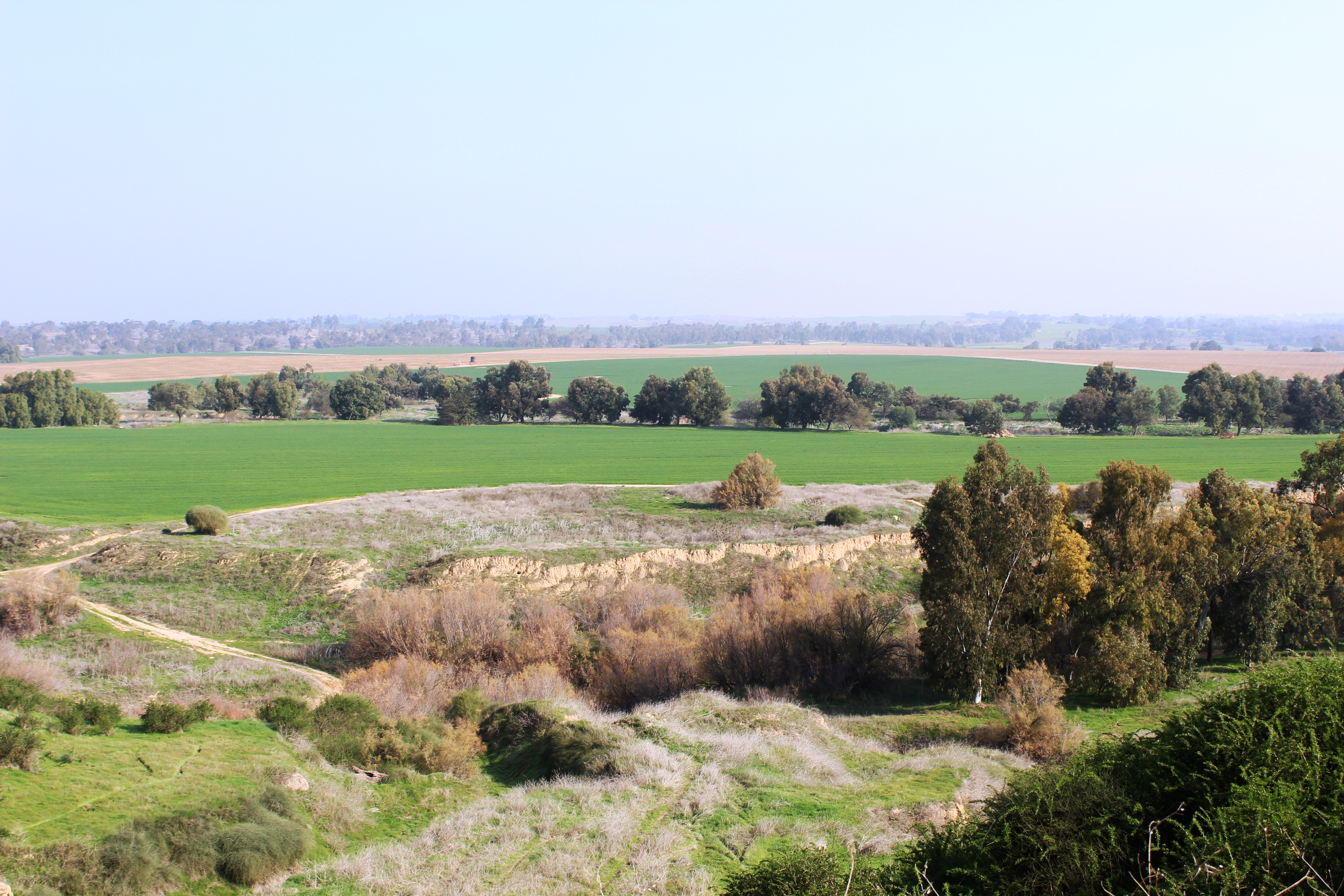
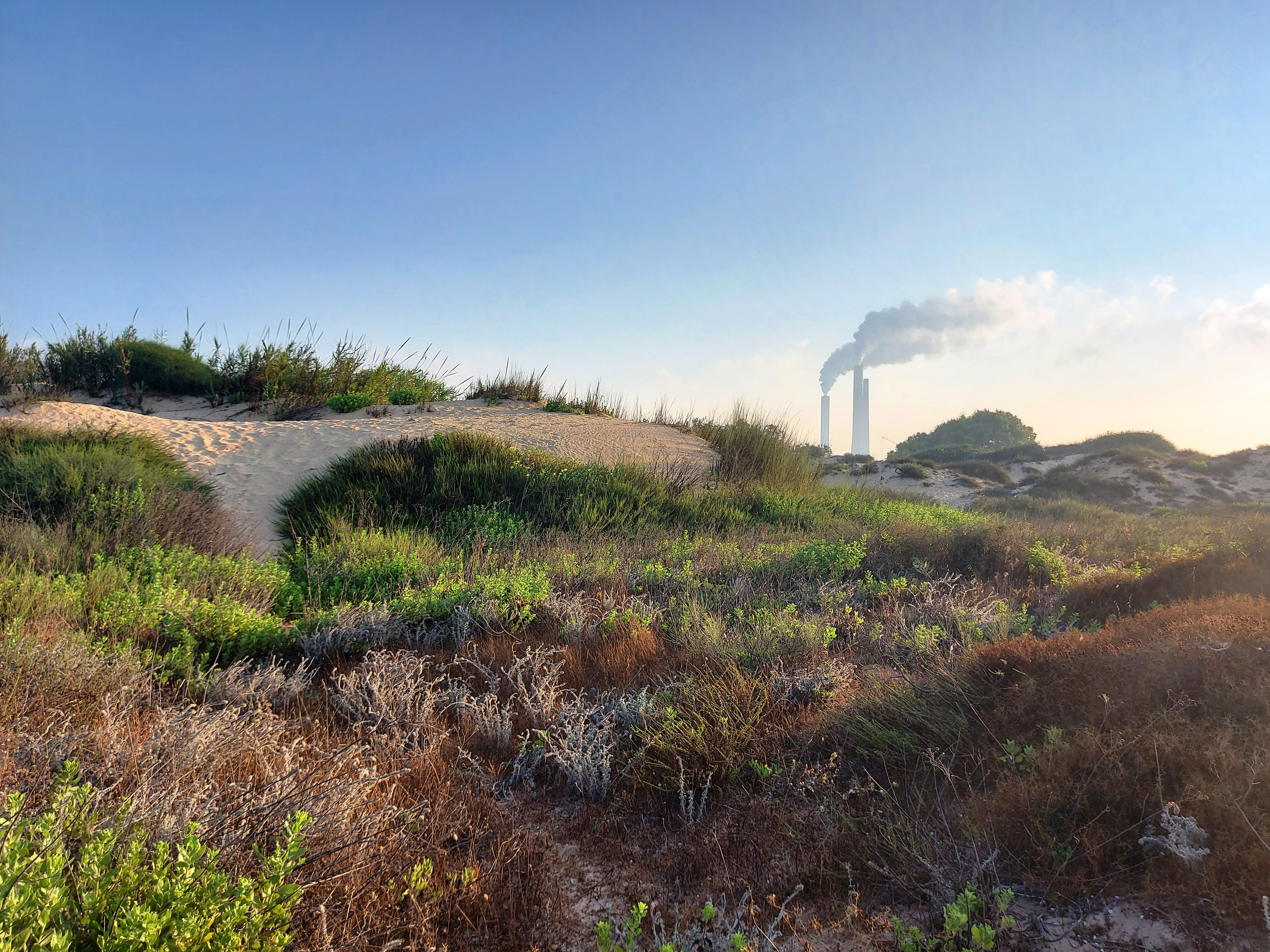
- Darom Adom festival Anemone coronaria flowers Sderot market Ashkelon beach Nir Oz in Purim 2018 Tel Gama nature reserve Zikim beach
- Types of settlements: Kibbutz, villages, towns
- Largest town: Ashkelon, Sderot

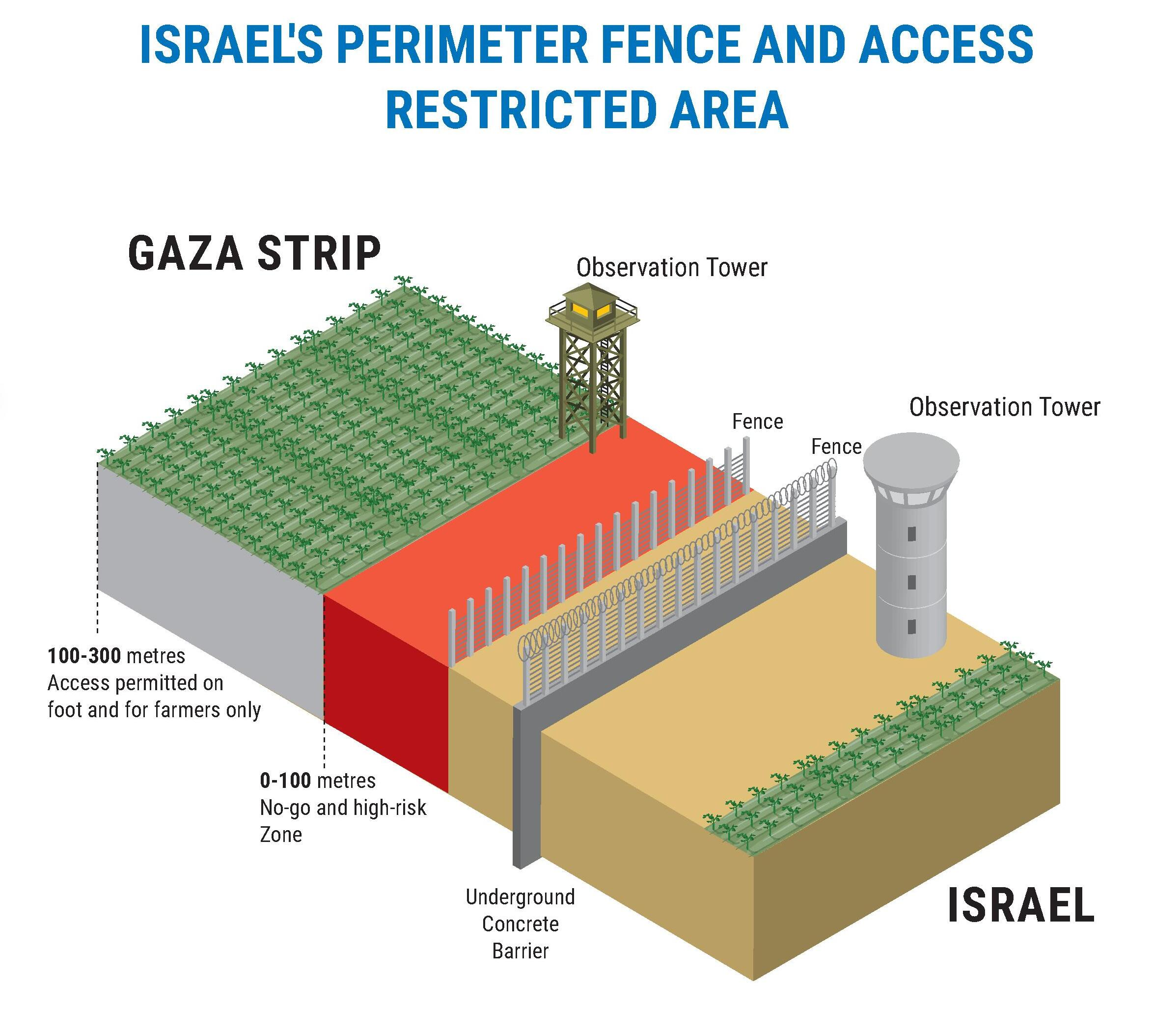
Layout of the border barrier separating the Gaza Envelope from the Gaza Strip, September 2023.

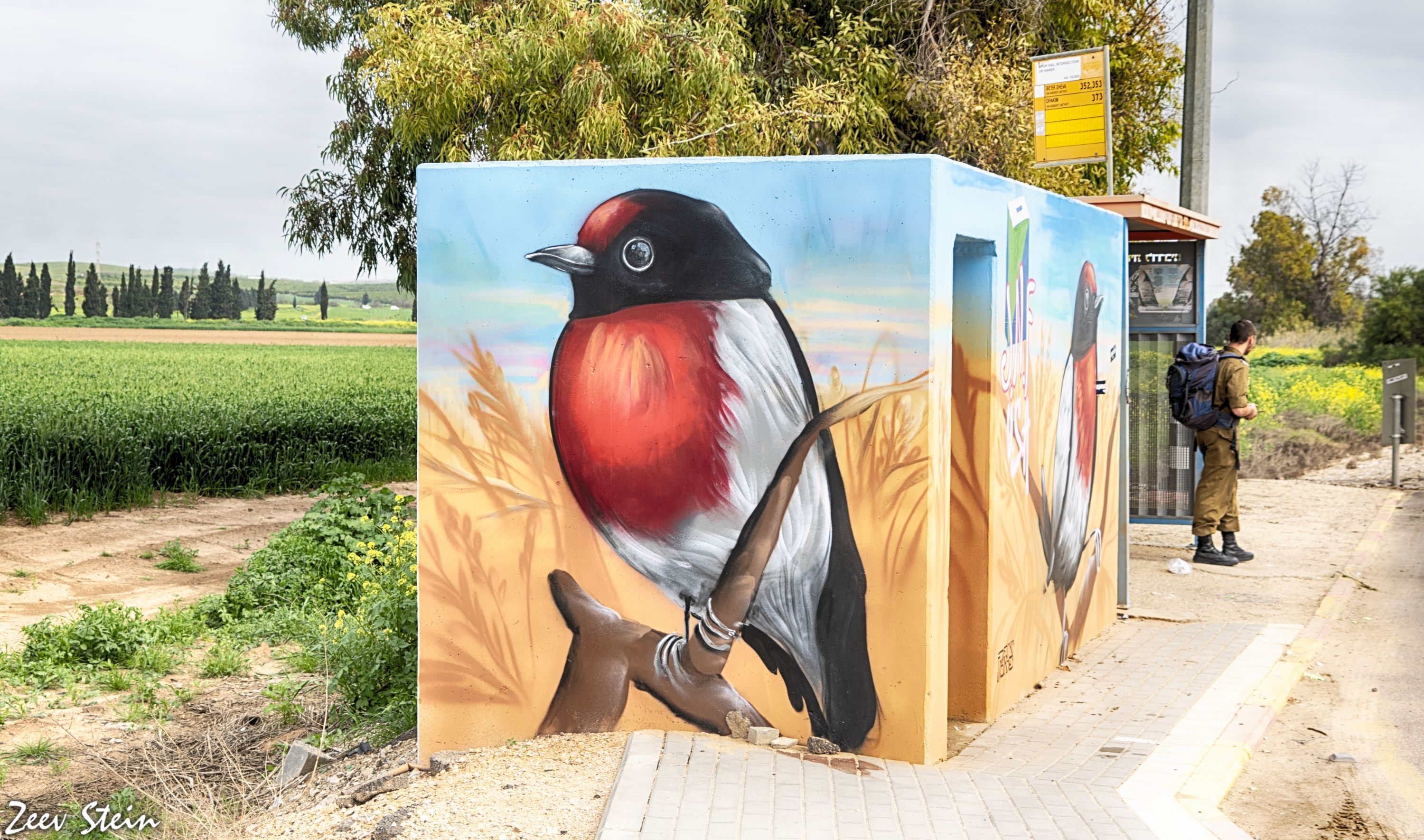
A concrete shelter in the Gaza Envelope

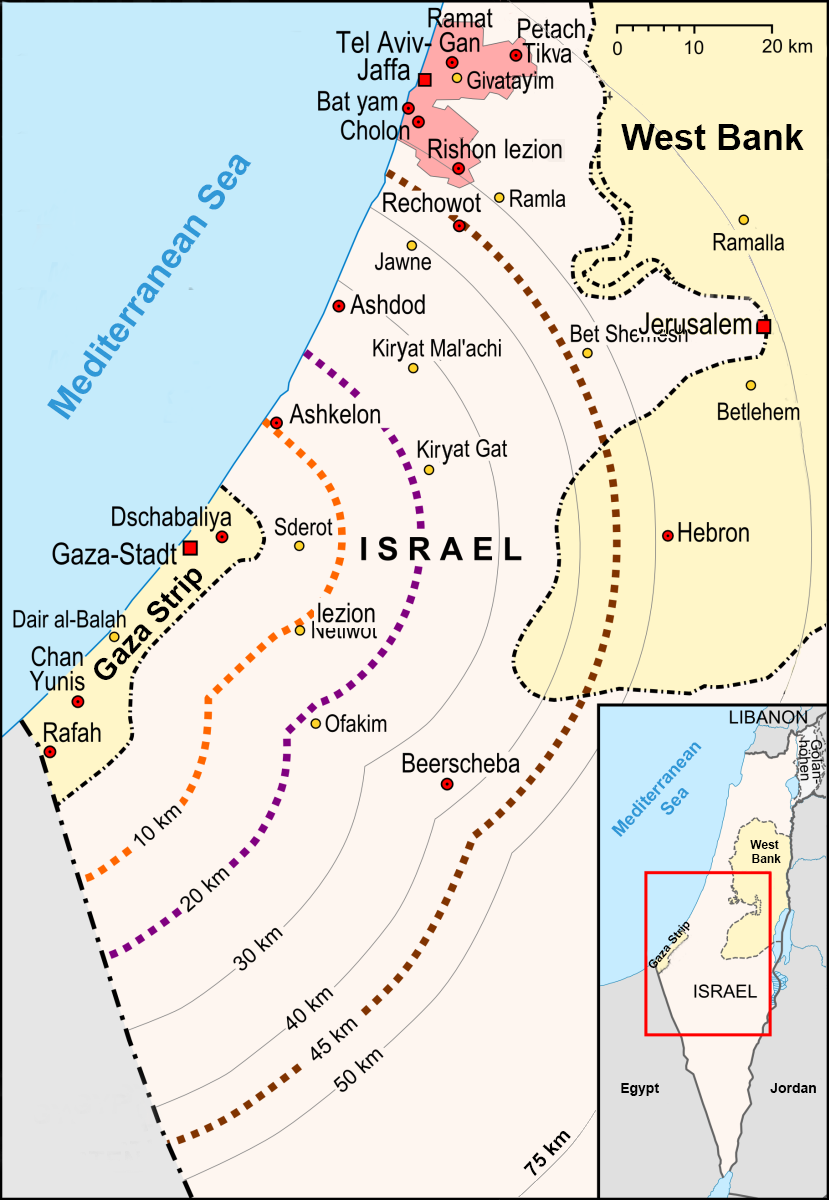
The Gaza Envelope is defined as the territory in Israel that is within 7 km of the Gaza Strip. The lines on the map are based on the amount of time residents have to seek shelter from rockets from the Gaza Strip.

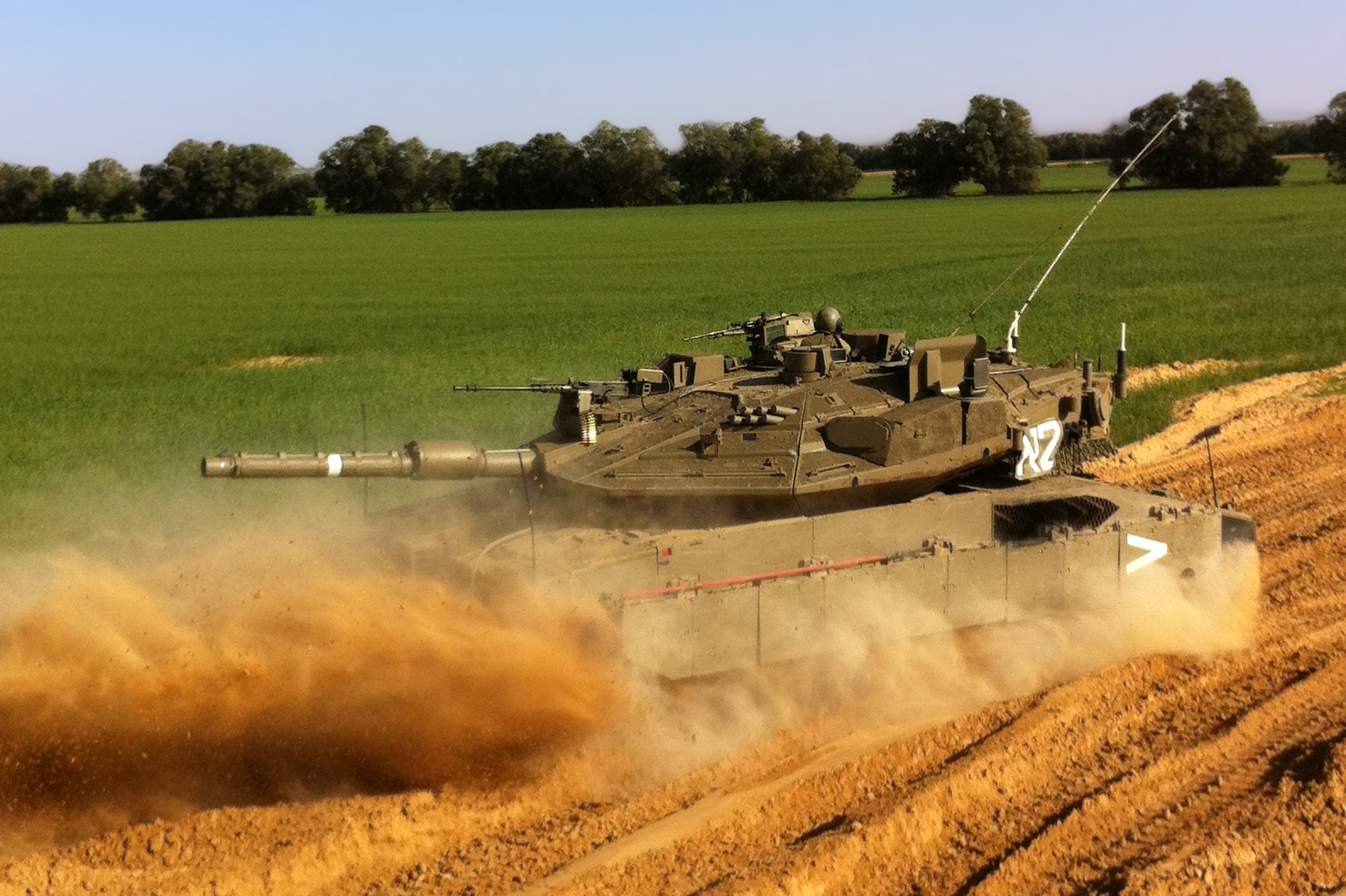
A Merkava Mark IV tank patrols the Gaza border (February 2012)

The Gaza Envelope (Hebrew: עוטף עזה, Otef Aza) is a modern administrative and security term that has become the common designation for the area in southern Israel immediately abutting its border with the Gaza Strip and its barrier, forming part of the broader, historic Western Negev (Hebrew: הַנֶּגֶב הַמַּעֲרָבִי, HaNegev HaMa'aravi) region.

Technically, the term specifies towns, kibbutzim, and moshavim situated within seven kilometres (4 1/2 miles) of the border, defining the core zone targeted by rocket and mortar attacks launched from Gaza. The region has long been the target of cross-border violence, culminating in a massive, coordinated invasion by Hamas and allied militants during the 2023 October 7 attacks.

The area is known for the Anemone coronaria flowering during spring, which is celebrated in the Darom Adom festival. Most of the population in the area resides in kibbutzim.

== Terminology and administrative definition ==
The Hebrew noun otef (עוֹטֶף), meaning "envelope" or "wrapper," came into use to spatially designate the ring of communities immediately abutting the border. The specific term Otef Aza (Gaza Envelope) dates back to 2003 under the leadership of Prime Minister Ariel Sharon, emerging in the wake of cross-border rocket fire from the Gaza Strip.

The definition was established through a series of government resolutions beginning on May 1, 2003, which initially encompassed localities within six kilometers of the border.

Government decisions on July 4, 2004, and August 1, 2004 formally defined a 7-kilometer Gaza Strip Envelope for peacetime economic and social support and later emergency evacuation plans. These criteria encompassed the city of Sderot and 44 communities across the Sha'ar HaNegev, Hof Ashkelon, Sdot Negev, and Eshkol Regional Councils, based on the estimated range of Hamas rockets at the time.

Israeli architect and author Eyal Weizman points to the Envelope's central role in enforcing the long-standing blockade of the Gaza Strip by Israel. According to Weizman, the Gaza Strip and Envelope can be seen as "the interdependent and co-constitutive projects of Israel's settler-colonial geography. The first, a concentration and exclusion zone for Palestinians dispossessed of their lands; and the second, a fortified envelope to pin them in."

== History ==
The border between Israel and the Gaza Strip was established in the 1949 Armistice Agreement between Israel and Egypt, signed at the end of the 1948 Arab–Israeli War, and was further defined in the agreement of February 1950. Many communities on the Israeli side of the border (such as Sa'ad and Nirim) were established even before that, while others (such as Sderot and Nahal Oz) were founded not long after the demarcation of the border. However, the term "Gaza envelope" has been applied to these communities only in the 21st century.

Following Israel's unilateral disengagement from the Gaza Strip in 2005, there was an increase in cross-border shelling and rocket attacks into Israel. Data collected by the Israeli Security Agency showed an increase in shelling from 401 shells in 2005 rising year-on-year to 2,048 in 2008 before falling back to 569 in 2009. In response to the increase in shelling, in 2007 the Knesset passed the "Assistance to Sderot and the Western Negev (Temporary Provision) Law, 2007", which recognized these communities (and additional communities in the area designated by the Minister of Finance's order) as "Confrontation-line Communities" and gave them special privileges (temporarily, until the end of 2008). Additional legislative measures extended the validity of some of the benefits, with certain changes, until the end of 2014. This area came to be known colloquially as the "Gaza envelope".

In June 2014, it was reported that the Home Front Command decided to cut the budget of the Coordinators of Comprehensive Security ("Ravshatzim") in communities in the Gaza envelope. Leaders of the authorities in the Gaza envelope turned to the Minister of Defense, Moshe Ya'alon, in a letter to cancel this decision. Shortly thereafter, the 2014 Gaza War began, during which the communities in the Gaza envelope were subjected to rocket and mortar attacks. In addition, combat tunnels were exposed, penetrating from the Gaza Strip into Israel, and there were several incidents where militants entered through the tunnels and attacked IDF soldiers. As a result of the fighting, many residents evacuated their homes.

In the 2014 Gaza War, impacts to residents in the Gaza envelope was greater than that of other Israeli citizens, due to their exposure to short-range rocket fire, extensive mortar shelling, and several casualties. Another threat to the residents of the Gaza periphery was the underground tunnels from the Gaza Strip into Israel. Many such tunnels were destroyed in the 2014 Gaza War, and the excavation and destruction continued in the years that followed.

After several years of calm following the 2014 Gaza War, during which plans were made for the emergency evacuation of communities in the Gaza envelope, on March 30, 2018, clashes began at the Gaza–Israel barrier – a series of mass protests in the Gaza Strip.

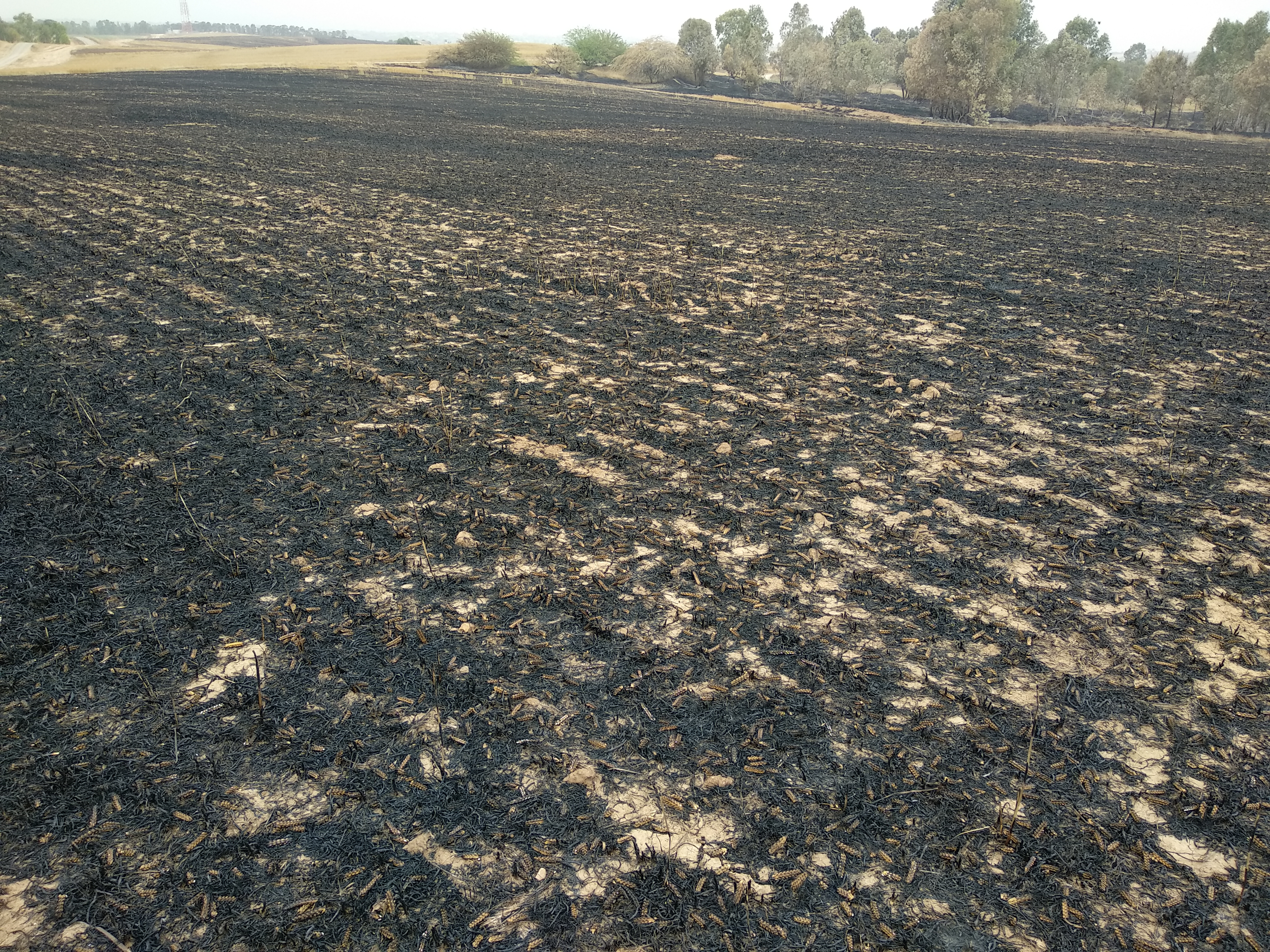
Damage caused by fire-kites, launched from the Gaza Strip

As part of the protests, Palestinian activists and militants clashed with the Israel Defense Forces near the system fence around the Gaza Strip. Thousands of Palestinians approached the fence, with some throwing stones and Molotov cocktail and explosive devices. The events continued since then, including the launching of incendiary kites from the Gaza Strip into Israel with the aim of igniting areas beyond the fence. As a result hundreds of fires occurred in the Gaza envelope, burning hundreds of hectares of fields and forests, as well as agricultural facilities.

In August 2018, hundreds of rockets and mortar shells were fired towards communities in the Gaza envelope.

=== Hamas attack in 2023 and rebuilding ===
In the October 7 attacks, Hamas and allied militants from the Gaza Strip infiltrated several communities in the Gaza envelope, with 1,195 people killed and many more injured, as well as taking about 250 Israeli hostages. The Be'eri massacre and Nova festival massacre as well as other massacres were carried out during the attack by Hamas and its allies, initiating the Gaza war. Over 1,200 rockets were fired at the city of Ashkelon as of October 24. Therefore Ashkelon was designated as a community whose residents and business owners are entitled to compensation from the state also for indirect war damage caused to them for one year.

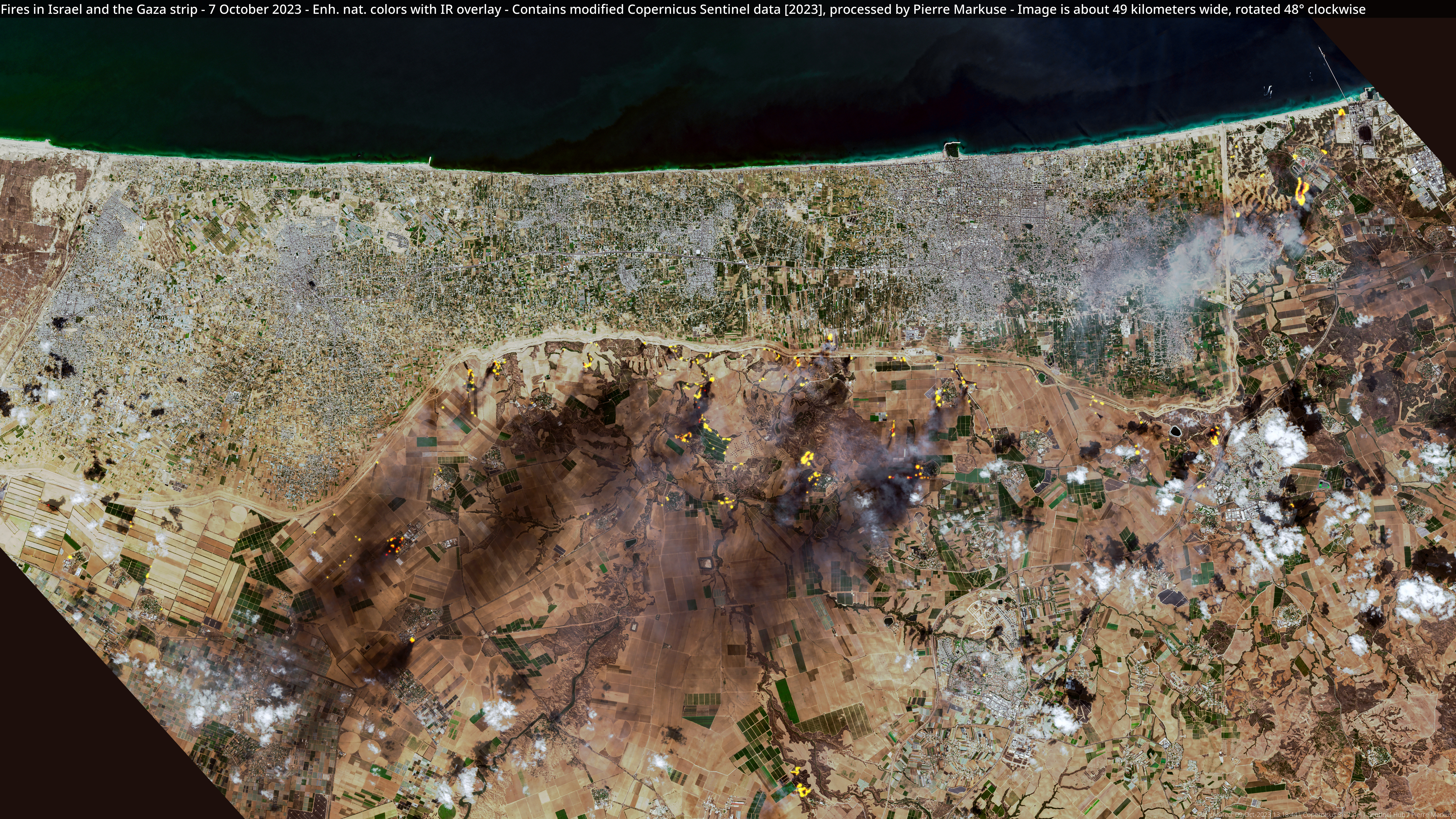
Fires in Israel near the Gaza strip - 7 October 2023. Image is about 48 kilometers wide.

After the attacks, most residents were evacuated by Israeli authorities to various locations throughout Israel, while there was also a gradual reopening of operations in the different communities. The attack solidified a breakdown in trust between Gaza envelope residents and the Israeli state, as residents blame the state for failing to protect them from years of rocket fire and ultimately, infiltration by Palestinian armed militants. Many residents expressed unwillingness to return to their homes until full security was ensured by the Israeli state.

On October 19, the Israeli government created a new agency called the Tkuma Directorate to rebuild the communities devastated by the October 7 attacks. The agency had a 5-year mandate and was headed by Moshe Edri, chairman of the Israel Atomic Energy Commission, who reported directly to Israeli prime minister Benjamin Netanyahu. The agency's focus was the regional councils within 7 kilometers of Gaza: Eshkol, Hof Ashkelon, Sdot Negev, and Sha’ar HaNegev. The government allocated $308 million to the agency, charged with physically rebuilding the destroyed areas, improve trust in the government, and serve as a "unified central response".

The Israeli government subsequently approved a 5-year $4.9 billion plan to rehabilitate and develop the Gaza envelope area. Returning residents who receive up to $275,000, depending on how close to the border they live, and new residents would be eligible for up to $137,000. The plan called for a discount on the municipal property tax, a temporary corporate tax cut, and preferential treatment for local vendors.

== Economy ==
The envelope's economy is mostly made up of agriculture, high-technology agriculture as well as some manufactured goods. Sderot, a city of 30,000 residents, also houses a local industrial park.

Following the October 7 attacks, major American philanthropic efforts, including more than $200 million allocated by UJA-Federation, are supporting regional economic recovery, community rebuilding, and local employment.

== Festivals ==
Every year, the Darom Adom festival is held in the area. The festival celebrates the flowering of Anemone coronaria.

The Cinema South International Film Festival is held in Sapir Academic College, Sderot every year. The festival shows films made up by people who live in the region and in the Western Negev.

== Education ==
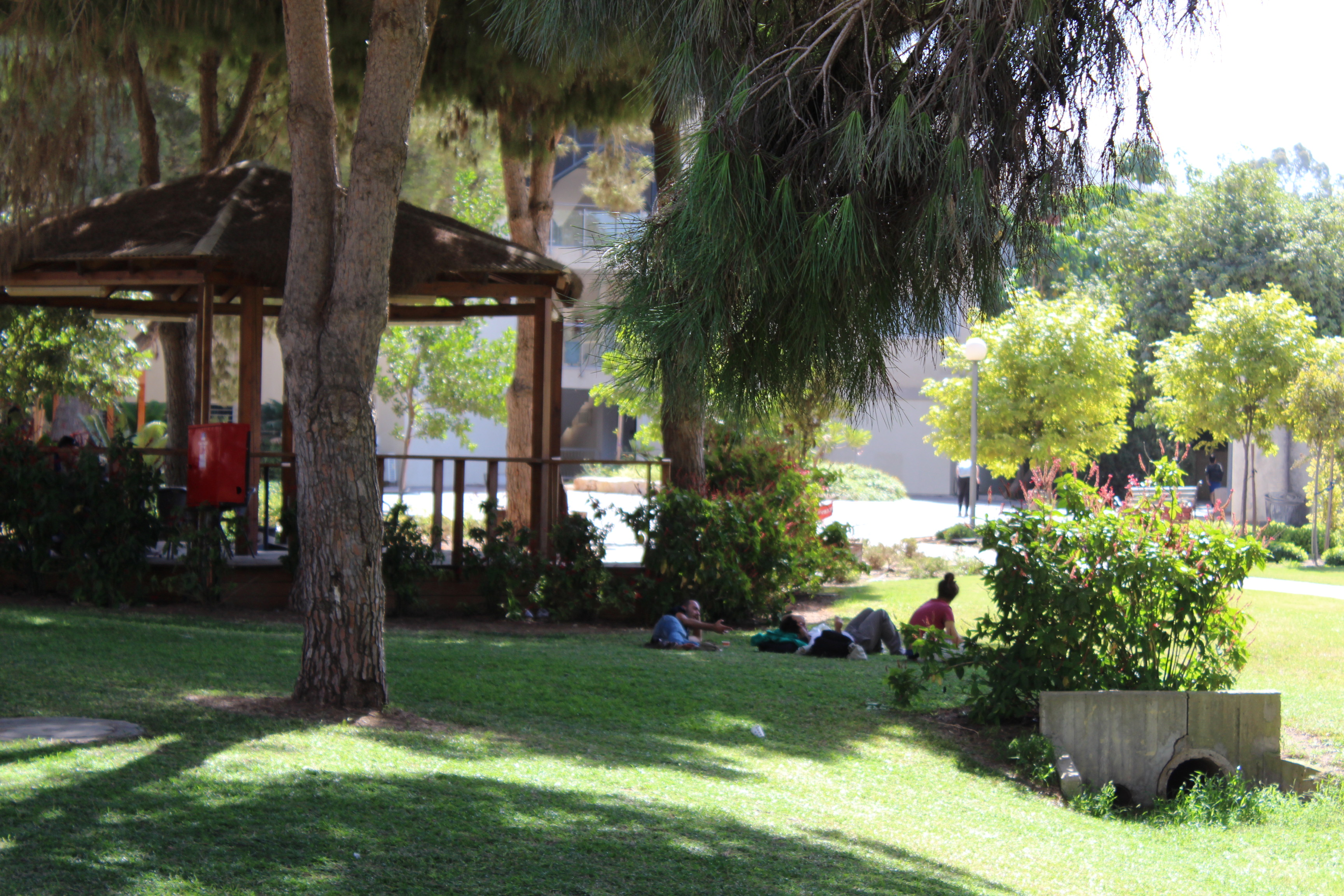
Sapir Academic College

Sapir Academic College is located near Sderot. As of 2024, the college had 6,000 students.

== Gaza envelope communities ==
The following communities were included in the list of communities in southern confrontation line area, published by the Israel Tax Authority:

- Sderot city
- Alumim
- Ami'oz
- Avshalom
- Be'eri
- Bror Hayil
- Dekel
- Dorot
- Ein HaBesor
- Ein HaShlosha
- Erez
- Gevim
- Gvar'am
- Havat Shikmim
- Holit
- Ibim
- Karmia
- Kerem Shalom
- Kfar Aza
- Kfar Maimon
- Kissufim
- Magen
- Mavki'im
- Mefalsim
- Mivtahim
- Nahal Oz
- Netiv HaAsara
- Nir Am
- Nir Oz
- Nir Yitzhak
- Nirim
- Ohad
- Or HaNer
- Pri Gan
- Re'im
- Sa'ad
- Sde Nitzan
- Sdei Avraham
- Shlomit
- Shokeda
- Shuva
- Sufa
- Talmei Eliyahu
- Talmei Yosef
- Tkuma
- Tushia
- Tzohar
- Yad Mordechai
- Yakhini
- Yated
- Yesha
- Yevul
- Zikim
- Zimrat

== See also ==
- Gaza District
- Gaza–Israel barrier
- Palestinian airborne arson attacks
