= Besor Natural Region =

Coordinates: 31°18′24″N 34°37′10″E

- Natural Region
- Memorial to the Nova music festival massacre perpetrated by Hamas on October 7, 2023
- Country: Israel
- District: Southern
- Subdistrict: Beersheba
- Largest City: Ofakim

Area
  - Total: 1,081 km^{2} (417 sq mi)

Population (2024)
  - Total: 68,766

Ethnicity
  - Jews and others: 91.4%
  - Arabs: 0.7%

The Besor Natural Region is a natural region in the Beersheba Subdistrict, in the Southern District of Israel. Ofakim is the largest city in the natural region.

== Geography ==
Districts, Subdistricts and Natural Regions of the State of Israel, 2018

The natural region consists of the northern edge of the Negev Desert in south-western Israel, west of Beersheba and bordering both Egypt and the Gaza Strip. It is named after the Besor Stream, the longest river in southern Israel, which flows through the natural region. It has an area of 1,081 km^{2}. The largest city in the natural region is Ofakim, which contains 58 percent of the natural region's population. There are no other towns in the natural region with more than 2,500 people. The natural region contains the Eshkol Regional Council along with portions of the Merhavim and Sdot Negev regional councils.

The Besor Natural Region was hit hard by the October 7 Hamas-led attacks on Israel. Some of the most horrific massacres and battles of those attacks, such as the Nova music festival massacre, the Be'eri massacre, and the Battle of Ofakim, took place there.

== Demographics ==
The vast majority of the residents of the Besor Natural Region are Jewish. There are no Arab towns in the natural region.

Historical population
Year	Pop.	±%
1972	15,100	—
1983	21,200	+40.4%
1995	30,600	+44.3%
2008	41,360	+35.2%
2022	62,325	+50.7%
2024	68,766	+10.3%

== Administrative local authorities ==
Cities	Local Councils	Villages
Ofakim	[None]	Eshkol: Ami'oz; Avshalom; Be'eri; Bnei Netzarim; Dekel; Ein HaBesor; Ein HaShlosha; Gvulot; Holit; Kerem Shalom; Kissufim; Magen; Mivtahim; Naveh; Nir Oz; Nir Yitzhak; Nirim; Ohad; Pri Gan; Re'im; Sde Avraham; Sde Nitzan; Shlomit; Sufa; Talmei Eliyahu; Talmei Yosef; Tze'elim; Tzohar; Urim; Yated; Yesha; Yevul; Merhavim: Bitkha; Eshel HaNasi; Gilat; Maslul; Patish; Peduim; Ranen; Tifrah; Sdot Negev: Alumim

== Voting Patterns ==
In the 2022 election, 71 percent of voters in the natural region voted for the parties of the right-wing coalition led by Benjamin Netanyahu, while 26 percent voted for the parties of the center-left coalition led by Yair Lapid and 0.3 percent voted for the Arab parties.

In the 2026 election, 68 percent of voters in the natural region voted for the parties of the right-wing coalition led by Benjamin Netanyahu, while 25 percent voted for the parties of the center-left coalition led by Gadi Eisenkot and 0.3 percent voted for the Arab parties. An additional 3.1 percent voted for the Reservists, and 1.9 percent voted for Amcha Yisrael. Voter turnout increased 18 percent from the 2022 election.
