= Talmei =

Talmei, a Hebrew word meaning furrows, may refer to the following places in Israel:

- Talmei Bilu
- Talmei Elazar
- Talmei Eliyahu
- Talmei Yaffe
- Talmei Yehiel
- Talmei Yosef
