= Tkuma =

Tkuma (Hebrew: תְּקוּמָה, literally "Revival" or "Rebirth") may refer to:

- Tkuma (political party), a political party in Israel
- Tkuma, Israel, a moshav in southern Israel
- Tkuma Directorate, Israeli governmental agency
