= Zouari =

Zouari is a surname. Notable people with the surname include:

- Abdelkrim Zouari (born 1989), Algerian footballer
- Abderrahim Zouari, Tunisian politician
- Fawzia Zouari, Tunisian writer and journalist
- Hakim Zouari (born 1988), Tunisian volleyball player
- Mohamed Zouari (1967–2016), Tunisian drone expert

== Other ==
- Sons of Zouari, Palestinian militant group
