= Talmei Yosef, Sinai =

Former Israeli settlement in Sinai

Coordinates: 31°12′38″N 34°14′34″E

Talmei Yosef
- Former Israeli settlement
- Interactive map of Talmei Yosef
- Country: Egypt
- Region: Sinai Peninsula
- Founded: 1977
- Founder: American and South African immigrants

Talmei Yosef (Hebrew: תלמי יוסף, lit. Yosef Furrows) was an Israeli settlement and moshav in the Sinai Peninsula. Located near Yamit, it was evacuated in 1982 as a result of the Camp David Accords.

The moshav was established in 1977 by a gar'in group of immigrants from South Africa and the United States. It was named after Yosef Weitz, a former director of the Land and Afforestation Department of the Jewish National Fund.

When the settlement was evacuated, its residents founded a new moshav by the same name in the Hevel Shalom area in Israel, close to the Egypt–Gaza border.
