= Palestinian airborne arson attacks =

Arson attacks on Israel from Gaza Strip using kites and balloons

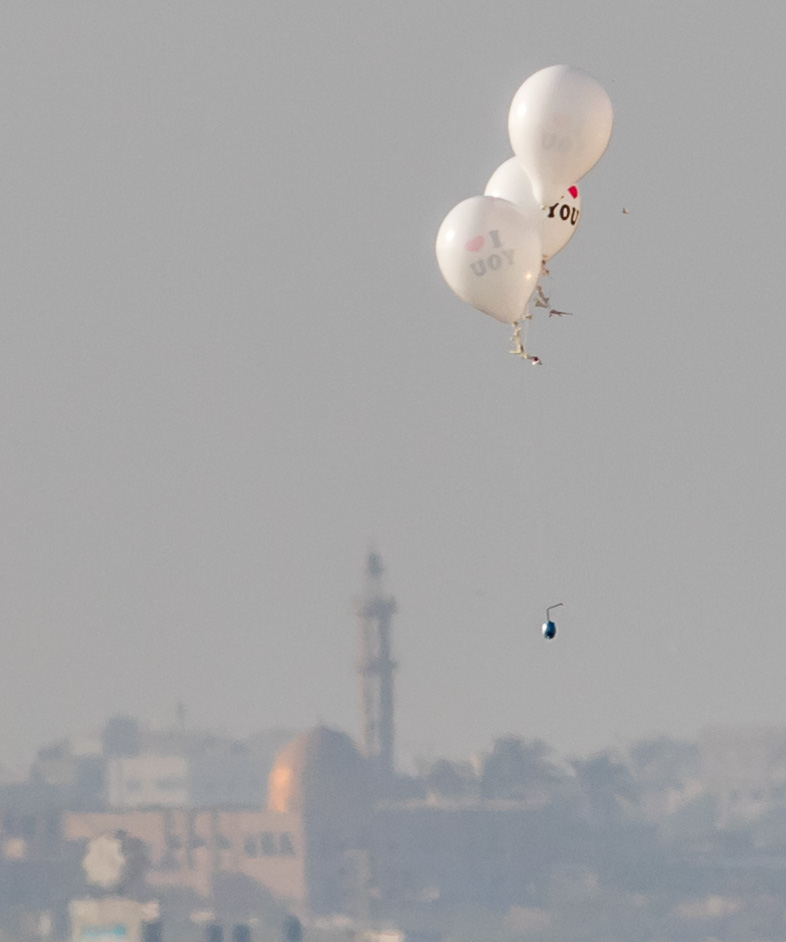
Helium party balloons bearing flammable materials launched from Bureij, Gaza Strip

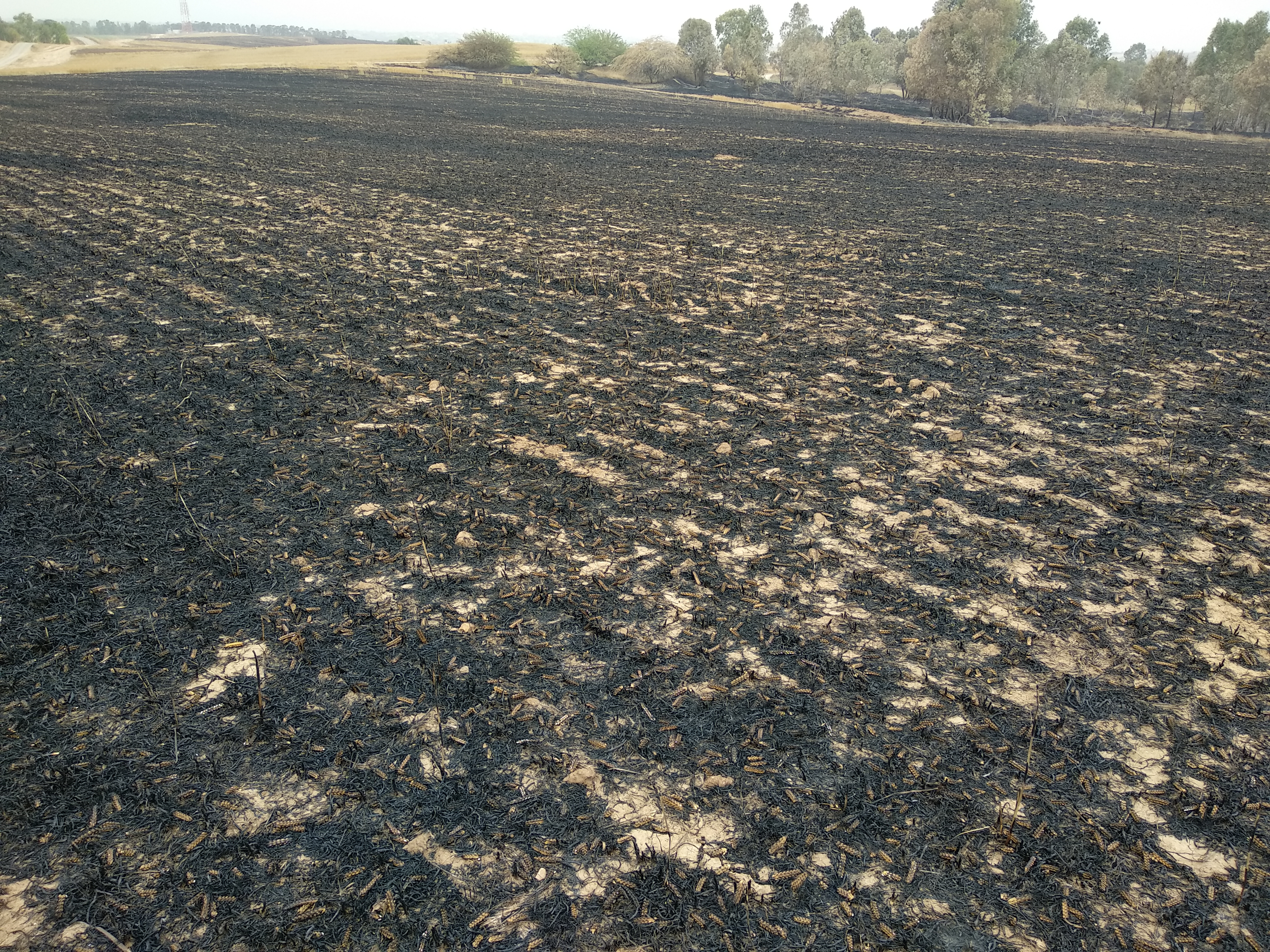
Burned fields by arson kites near Kibbutz Be'eri

The first wave of Palestinian airborne arson attacks on Israel from Gaza Strip using airborne incendiary devices (incendiary balloons, incendiary kites etc.) was launched in May 2018 during the 2018 Gaza border protests. These attacks took advantage of the prevailing westwards winds to propel the airborne devices to Israel. The fires that ensued annihilated distinctive habitats, ecosystems, and agricultural fields.

== History ==
Since the beginning of the border riots, Palestinians increasingly utilized incendiary kites, a primitive weapon that managed to evade detection by IDF surveillance. In some instances, Palestinians downed IDF surveillance drones with slingshots as the drones attempted to intercept the incendiary kites. By early May 2018, hundreds of kites had been launched into Israel, resulting in devastating consequences. Hundreds of acres of JNF forests were set ablaze, causing immediate damage estimated at half a million shekels. The long-lasting consequences were also significant, as it will take years to restore the vegetation and soil that were incinerated. On May 2, a massive fire broke out in the Be'eri Forest, destroying several hundred dunams of forest land.

From May 2018, incendiary balloons carrying pre-lit Molotov cocktails were launched from the Gaza Strip in addition to kites. These balloons have a longer range compared to the kites. When the Molotov cocktail ignites, the balloons explode in midair and set off fires in different locations. This has led to fires in a wheat field near Mefalsim and Be'eri Forest. While launches of these balloons were reported in early April, their use escalated significantly in May.

On May 11, the IDF deployed new, small remote-controlled drones equipped with knives on their wings to combat incendiary kites by cutting their guide lines. Reportedly, these drones downed more than 40 kites in the first two days. However, this method ultimately proved ineffective.

By July 2018, incendiary kites and balloons had caused 678 fires in Israel, burning 910 hectares (2,260 acres) of woodland and 610 hectares (1,500 acres) of agricultural land. Some balloons landed in residential areas of the Eshkol Regional Council and the Sdot Negev Regional Council, though no injuries were reported. A cluster of balloons reached Beersheba, located some 40 kilometers (25 mi) from the Gaza Strip.

In response to the escalating incendiary attacks, Israel took action. On July 9, 2018, Israel closed the Kerem Shalom border crossing, and on July 16, the transfer of gas and fuel via the crossing was stopped.

Continued airborne arson attacks were reported in 2019, 2020 (in August 2020 fuel shipments to Gaza Strip were suspended again, in response of the resumed arson attacks. This caused the shut down of the only Gaza Strip power plant.), and 2021. In July 2021 Israel has reduced the fishing zone off Gaza by half, from 12 nautical miles to 6, in response to incendiary balloons launched into the Eshkol Regional Council area.

To combat the new form of terrorism, the only reliable method was constant monitoring and putting out the fires by hand. In February 2020, the Light Blade (Lahav or), a new laser weapon system was deployed as an operational experiment to the Gaza border against kites and balloons.

== Motivation ==
A member of the Sons of Zouari group, responsible for many arson attacks, said in an interview:

"We, as Palestinians, do not recognize these fields as belonging to the enemy. These are our lands, and the fields planted on them are not theirs by right. These are our lands, and we have the right to them. We say to them: We will not let you sow our lands and enjoy them. We will burn your fields, which you harvest to pay for the bullets that you use to shoot children and peaceful unarmed demonstrators."

== Environmental damage ==
The resulting fires caused harm to wildlife, unique habitats, and ecosystems. While agricultural fields are likely to recover relatively quickly, the same cannot be said for wildlife in protected areas. In 2018, the Israel Nature and Parks Authority reported that approximately 10 square kilometers of conservation areas were affected. Although much of the flora is expected to return within a year, the complete recovery of the ecosystem will take considerably longer. Reportedly, both larger animals such as foxes, porcupines, and jackals, as well as smaller creatures like rodents, snakes, and insects, have been killed in significant numbers. Since the reserves adjacent to Gaza are relatively small, the impact of the fires on these areas is disproportionately large. Concerns have been raised about the declining diversity of flora following the fires and the encroachment of invasive species into the recovering areas.

Among the protected areas affected were the Be'eri Badlands Nature Reserve, Karmia Sands Nature Reserve, and Besor Stream Nature Reserve.

Another significant concern is air pollution resulting from the massive fires. In addition to the smoke produced by the arsons, the burning of tires during the protests has led to the release of toxic chemicals into the air. Furthermore, burning forests contribute to increased levels of CO_{2} in the atmosphere, thereby exacerbating the greenhouse effect.

== See also ==
- Palestinian stone-throwing
- Palestinian rocket attacks on Israel
- Gaza envelope
- Environmental terrorism
- Gaza war
