= Tkuma Directorate =

Israeli government agency

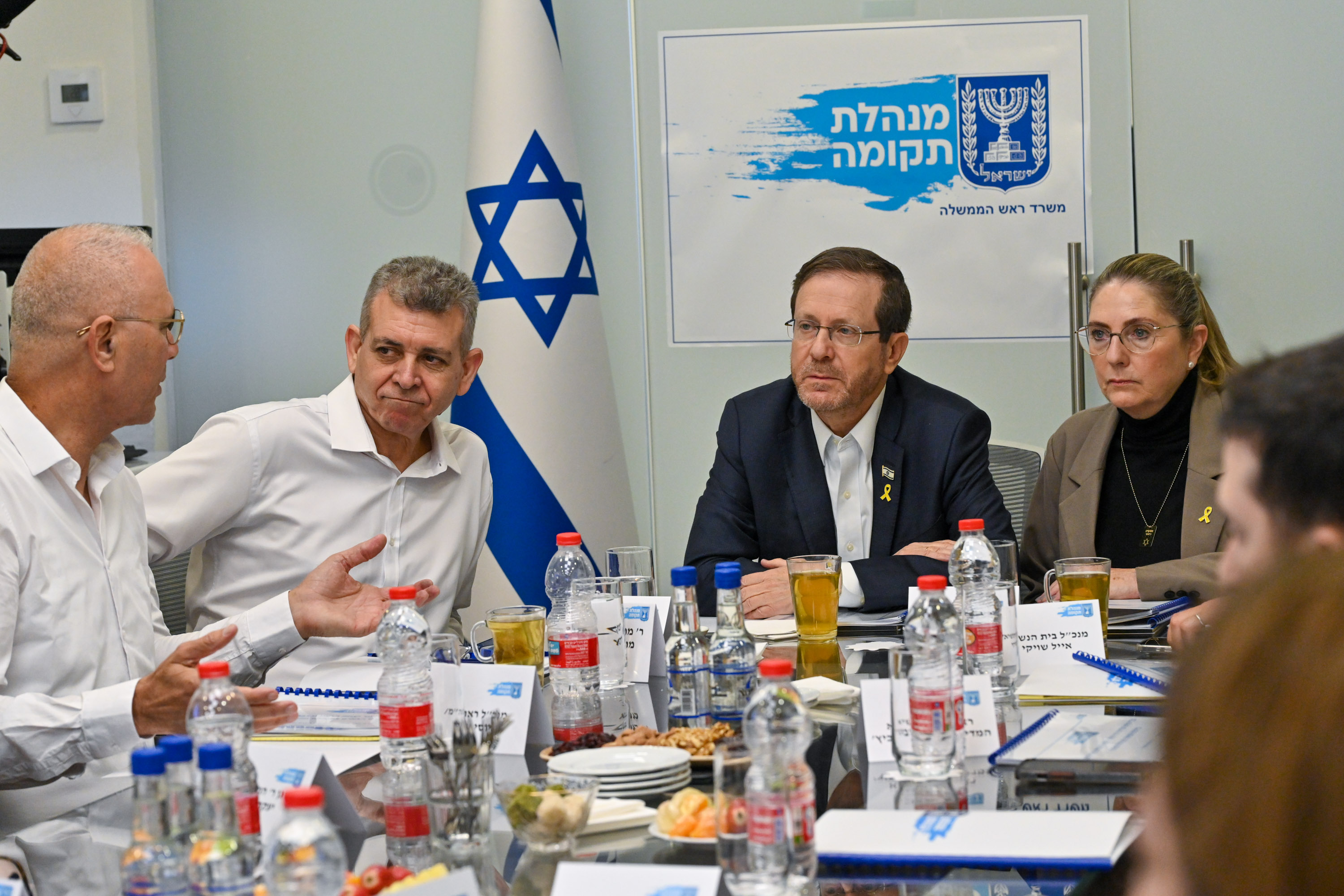
President of Israel Isaac Herzog talks with the head of the Rebirth Administration agency and Israel Atomic Energy Commission, Moshe Edri, at the Rebirth Administration office

The Tkuma Directorate (Hebrew: מנהלת תקומה, romanized: Minhelet Tkuma) also known as the Rebirth Administration is an Israeli government agency that belongs to Israel's Prime Minister's Office. It was established in response to the 2023 Hamas-led attack on Israel, following the devastation observed in the kibbutzim and towns in the Gaza Envelope.

The goal of the directorate, is to rehabilitate the towns at the Gaza Envelope, that suffered great damage from the infiltration of Hamas.

The directorate is responsible for 45 towns and kibbutzim in the regional councils of Eshkol, Hof Ashkelon, Sdot Negev and Sha'ar HaNegev. the agency also supports the city of Sderot, which suffered from Battle of Sderot.

The directorate was established for five years (19 October 2023 - 2028).

The head of the directorate is IDF Brigadier General (in reserve) Moshe Edri, who also serves as head of the Israel Atomic Energy Commission.

Yossi Sheli, CEO of the Prime Minister's Office, delayed the establishment of the agency for two weeks, because of his opposition to the appointment of Udi Adiri, who was involved in the thirty-sixth government of Israel. In addition, five billion shekels were slashed from the Directorate in 2025.
