= Yesha, Israel =

Yesha: יֵשַׁע (Hebrew); ييشع (Arabic)

- Location within Northwest Negev region of Israel Location within Israel
- Coordinates: 31°14′48″N 34°24′1″E
- Country: Israel
- District: Southern
- Subdistrict: Beersheba
- Council: Eshkol
- Affiliation: Moshavim Movement
- Founded: 1957
- Founder: Egyptian immigrants
- Population (2024): 785

Yesha (Hebrew: יֵשַׁע, lit. Salvation) is an agricultural moshav in southern Israel. Located in the Hevel Shalom area of the Negev desert, it falls under the jurisdiction of Eshkol Regional Council. In 2024 it had a population of 785.

== History ==
The moshav was established in 1957 by Jews who were expelled from Egypt in the wake of the 1956 Suez Crisis. Its name is derived from the biblical passage "with the power of salvation of his [God's] right hand" (Psalms 20:6).

Yesha has been a target of Palestinian rocket attacks from the Gaza Strip, one which killed a 70-year-old woman in 2008.

In the October 7 attacks, five of the six members of Yesha's emergency squad were killed while defending the community. These are: Lior Ben Yaakov, Gil Avital, Itai Nachmias, Tal Maban and Dan Assulin. Hamas terrorists also kidnapped and killed foreign workers from Thailand who were working in Yesha.

== Economy ==
Uri Tutim (Uri’s Strawberries) farm was established in 1965.

== See also ==
- Jewish exodus from the Muslim world
