= Tzohar =

Tzohar: צֹחַר, צוחר (Hebrew); تسوحر (Arabic)

Hebrew transcription(s)
  - Unofficial: Tzochar, Zochar, Zohar
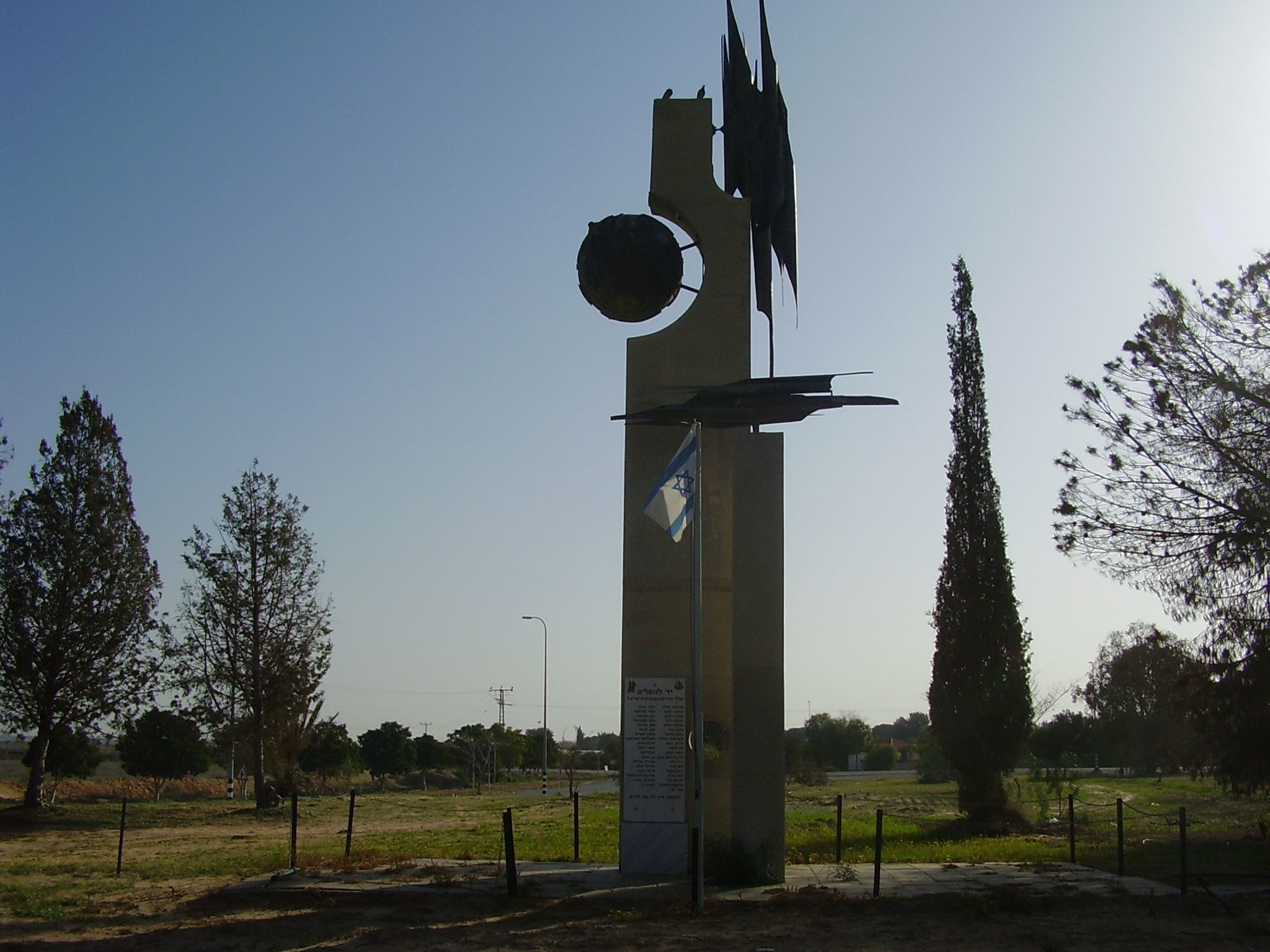
- Memorial to Regiment 128

- Location within Northwest Negev region of Israel Location within Israel
- Coordinates: 31°14′8″N 34°25′35″E
- Country: Israel
- District: Southern
- Subdistrict: Beersheba
- Council: Eshkol
- Founded: 1970
- Founder: Ethiopian Jews
- Population (2024): 629

Tzohar (Hebrew: צֹחַר) is a community settlement and regional center in southern Israel. Located in Hevel Eshkol, it falls under the jurisdiction of Eshkol Regional Council. In 2024 it had a population of 629.

== History ==
The settlement was founded in 1970 as a regional center for the villages in Hevel Eshkol. It was named after a son of Simeon mentioned in Genesis 46:10, as the neighbouring moshav Ohad was named after his brother, mentioned in the same Bible verse. In the 1990s it absorbed many immigrants from Ethiopia and the former Soviet Union, many of whom lived in mobile homes.

On 7 October 2023 about 80 Hamas attackers attempted to infiltrate the community. A two-person security team succeeded in stopping the militants. The terrorists retreated, leaving a dozen bodies behind."
