= Mivtahim =

Moshav in southern Israel

Mivtahim: מִבְטַחִים (Hebrew)
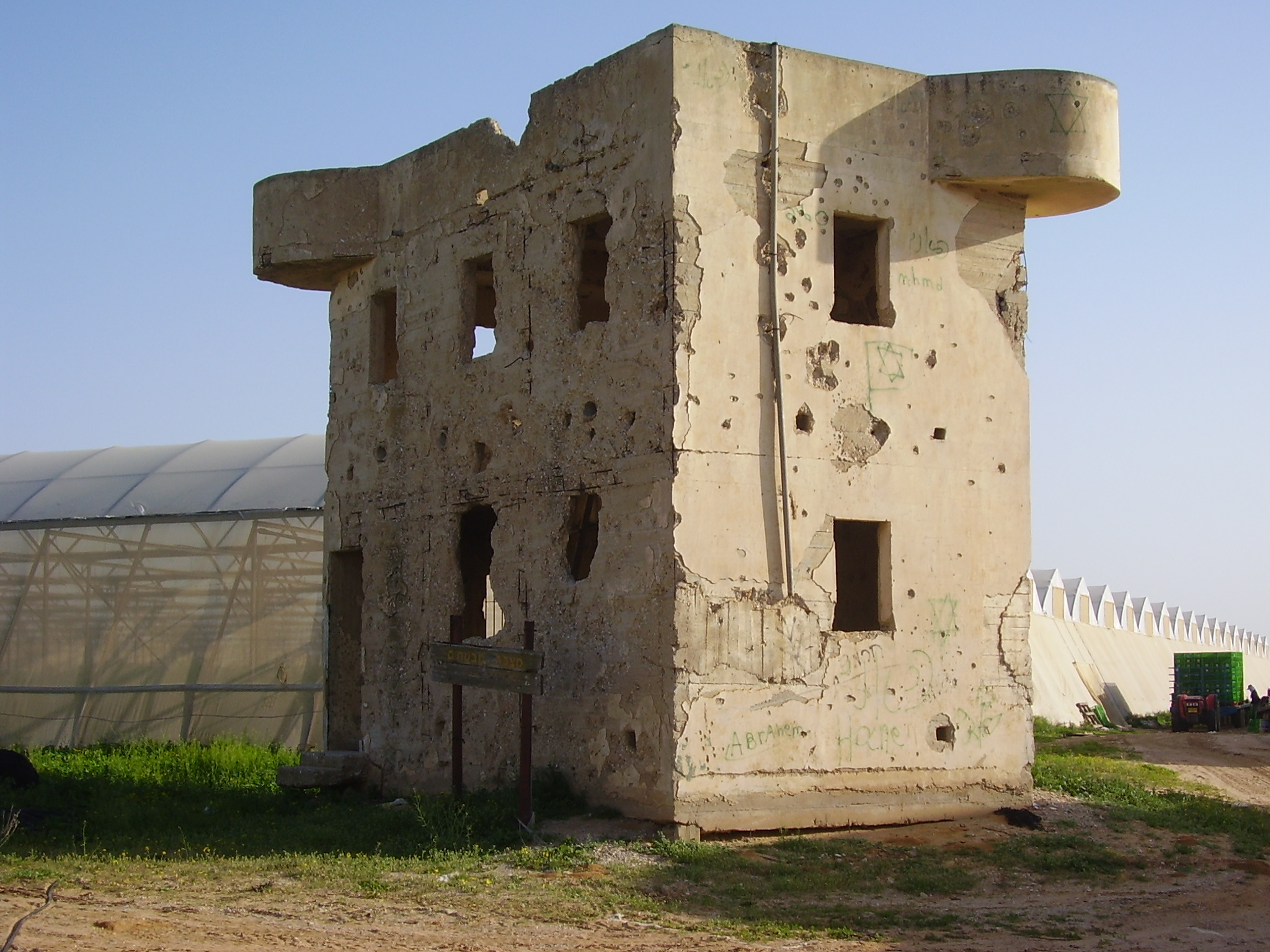
- Old Security House in Mivtahim

- Location within Northwest Negev region of Israel
- Coordinates: 31°14′32″N 34°24′28″E
- Country: Israel
- District: Southern
- Subdistrict: Beersheba
- Council: Eshkol
- Affiliation: Moshavim Movement
- Founded: 7 January 1947 (kibbutz); 1950 (moshav)
- Founder: HaOved HaTzioni members
- Population (2024): 1,070

Mivtahim (Hebrew: מִבְטַחִים, lit. 'Safe Havens') is a moshav in southern Israel. Located in the Hevel Eshkol area of the north-western Negev desert near the Gaza Strip border and covering an area of 4,000 dunams, it falls under the jurisdiction of Eshkol Regional Council. In 2024 it had a population of 1,070.

== History ==
The village was first established on 7 January 1947 as a kibbutz of the HaOved HaTzioni movement. Its name is taken from Isaiah 32:18:

And my people shall abide in a peaceable habitation, and in secure dwellings, and in quiet resting-places.

On 22 April 1948 there was a severe clash between the British Army and guards of the kibbutz, with armed units including tanks arriving at the gates. During the 1948 Arab–Israeli War residents decided to evacuate Mivtahim and join with residents of Nitzanim to found a new kibbutz. All that remains today of the original settlement is a security building.

In 1950 a moshav was founded adjacent to the abandoned kibbutz by immigrants from Kurdistan. In 1954 they were joined by immigrants from Morocco and more from Kurdistan. The moshav was used as an infantry base by the IDF during the Suez Crisis.

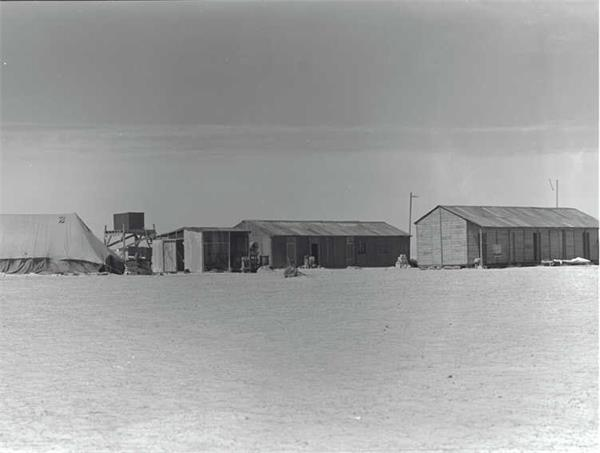
Mivtahim in 1947

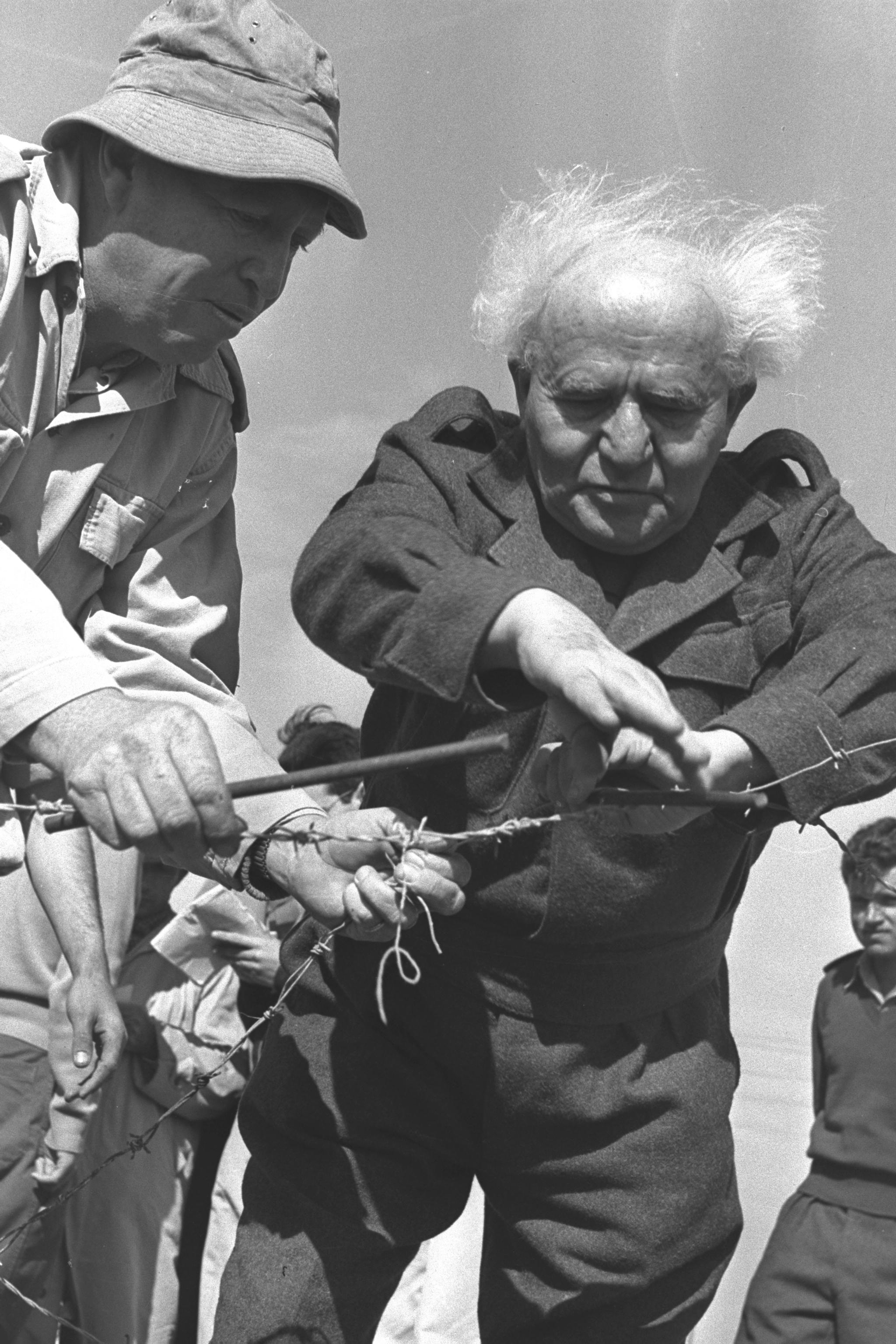
David Ben-Gurion building a security fence in Mivtahim in 1956
