= Ami'oz =

Moshav in southern Israel

Ami'oz: עַמִּיעוֹז (Hebrew)

Hebrew transcription(s)
  - Official: Ammi'oz
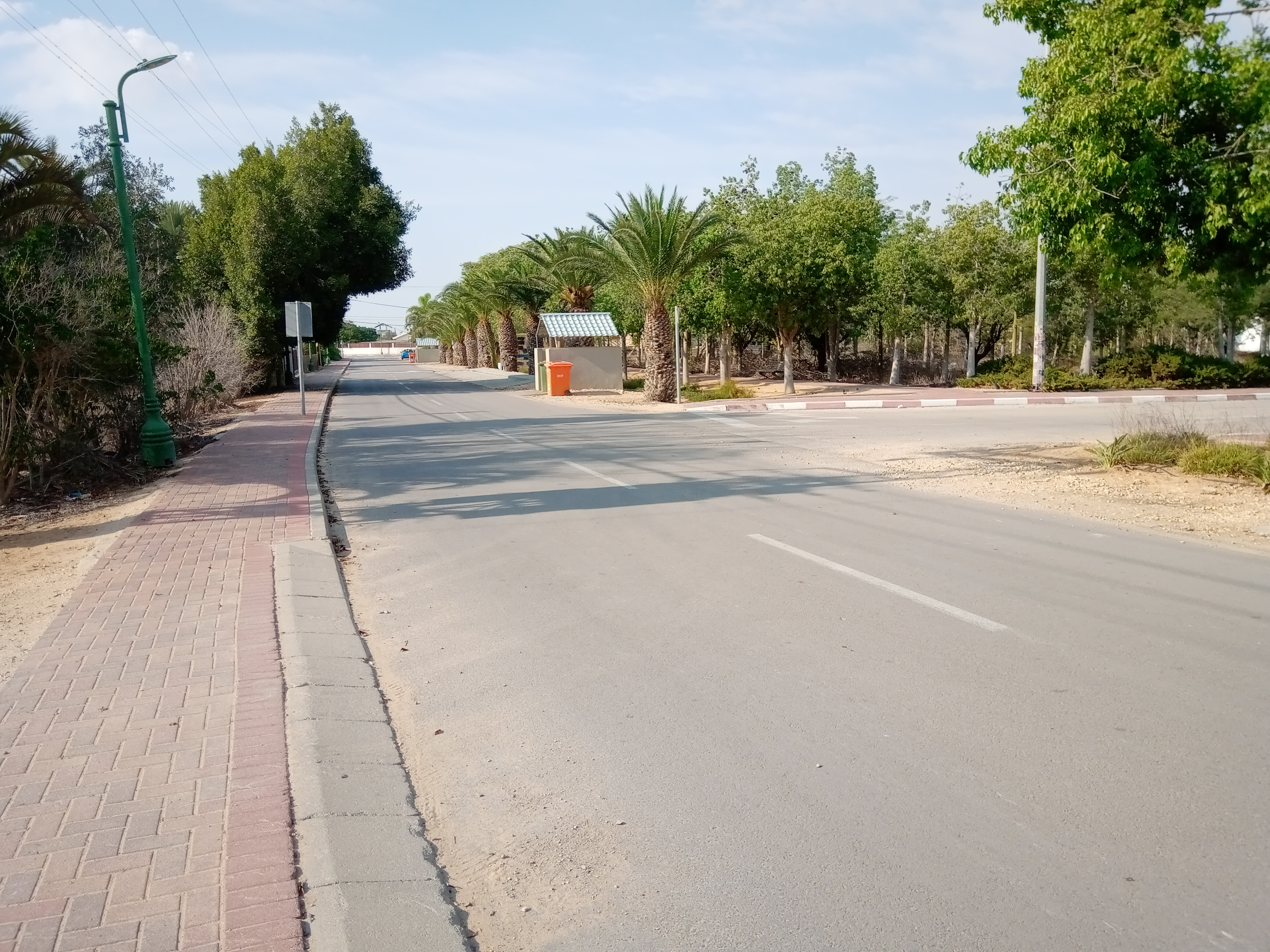

- Location within Northwest Negev region of Israel Location within Israel
- Coordinates: 31°14′54″N 34°24′51″E
- Country: Israel
- District: Southern
- Subdistrict: Beersheba
- Council: Eshkol
- Affiliation: Moshavim Movement
- Founded: 1956
- Founder: Egyptian Jewish refugees Romanian Jews
- Population (2024): 840

Ami'oz (Hebrew: עַמִּיעוֹז) is a moshav in southern Israel. Located in the Hevel Eshkol area of the north-western Negev desert near the border with the Gaza Strip, it falls under the jurisdiction of Eshkol Regional Council. In 2024 it had a population of 840.

== History ==
The moshav was first established in 1956 by Jewish immigrants and refugees from Egypt and Romania. Its name recognises the strength (Hebrew: עוז, Oz) displayed by IDF soldiers during the Suez Crisis.

However, it was not a success, and all but four families left. In the early 1960s some Vizhnitz Jews arrived to attempt to settle the area, though they also failed. The community was permanently established in 1962 by a group of immigrants from Morocco who settled on the site with the aid of the Jewish Agency.
