= Sons of Zouari =

Palestinian militant group

The Sons of Zouari (Arabic: أبناء الزواري) are a militant group in Gaza, responsible for launching incendiary kites and balloons into Israel causing damage to fields and land, during the 2018 Gaza border protests. The group's incendiary balloons are usually attached with Molotov cocktails, grenades, and other flammable materials, and inflated with helium. The wind from the Mediterranean sea allows the kites and balloons to float into Israeli territory and cause damage to farmland, forests, and wildlife. The group is named after Hamas’s chief drone expert and engineer Mohamed Zouari, inspired by his method of "invasion by air" as he supervised an unmanned aircraft during the 2014 Gaza War. In June 2018, the Israeli Air Force targeted the car of one of the group's leaders, though the car was empty at the time. The group targets both houses and land. Damage by kites has caused damage to thousands of acres of Israeli farmland near Gaza during the 2018 Gaza border protests.

== Motivations ==
In an interview with one of the members of the group, when asked about the motivations behind the attacks on the fields the member said "We, as Palestinians, do not recognize these fields as belonging to the enemy. These are our lands, and the fields planted on them are not theirs by right. These are our lands, and we have the right to them. We say to them: We will not let you sow our lands and enjoy them. We will burn your fields, which you harvest to pay for the bullets that you use to shoot children and peaceful unarmed demonstrators."
