= Hevel Shalom =

District in Israel

Coordinates: 31°12′13″N 34°20′16″E

Hevel Shalom (Hebrew: חבל שלום, lit. Shalom region) is an area in the western Negev desert close to Israel's border with the Gaza Strip and Egypt's Sinai. This area was elected to be substitutive area for evacuees from Yamit.

== Villages ==
Villages in Hevel Shalom are mostly organised as moshavim, though they include some kibbutzim as well as one community settlement. All settlements are administered by the Eshkol Regional Council.

- Avshalom
- Bnei Netzarim
- Dekel
- Holit
- Kerem Shalom
- Peri Gan
- Sde Avraham
- Sufa
- Talmei Yosef
- Yated
- Yevul

Holit, Sufa, and Talmei Yosef were settled by evacuees from Yamit.
