= Pri Gan =

Pri Gan: פרי גן (Hebrew)
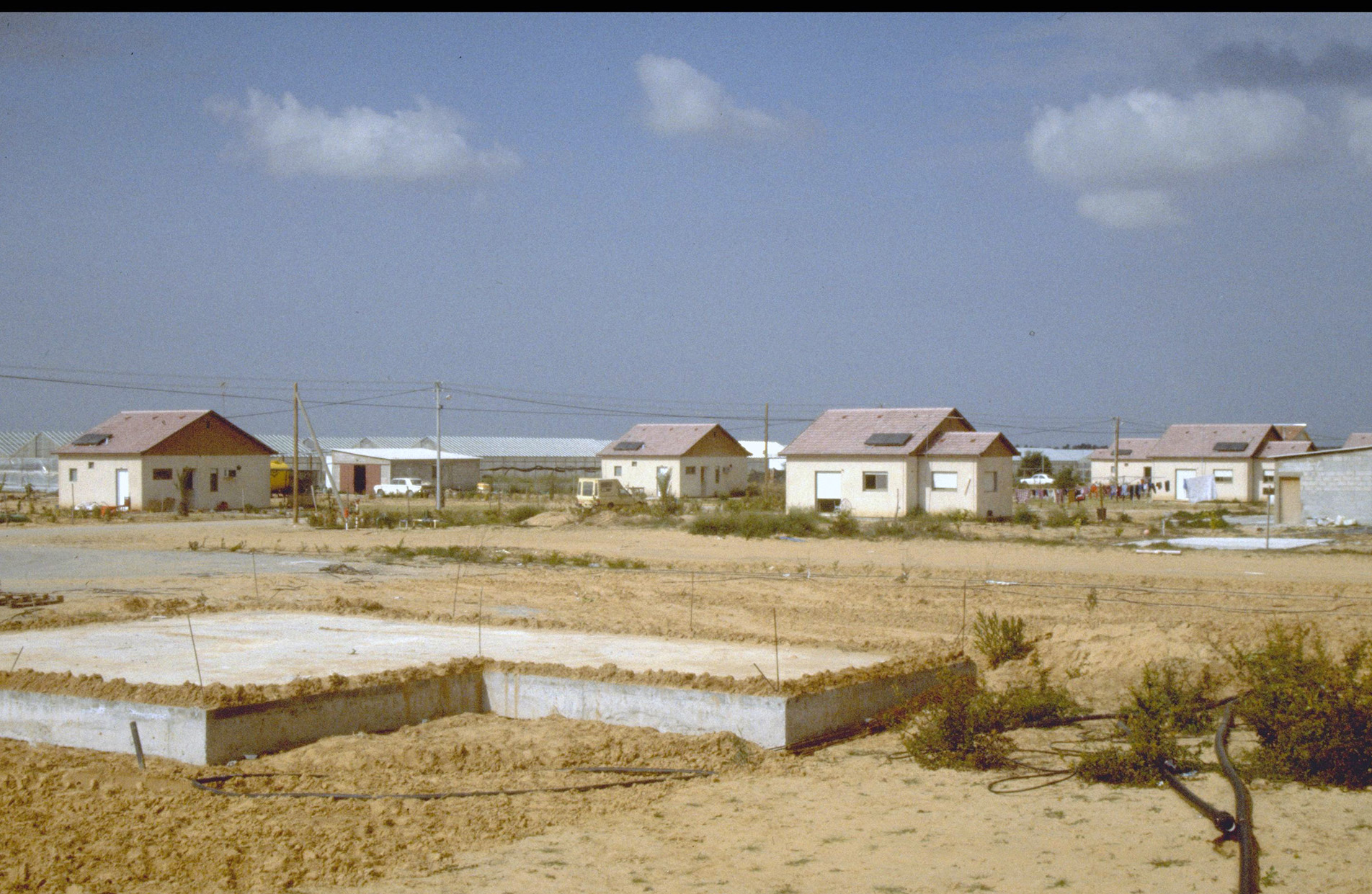
- Moshav Pri Gan, 1983

- Location within Northwest Negev region of Israel
- Coordinates: 31°13′16″N 34°21′16″E
- Country: Israel
- District: Southern
- Subdistrict: Beersheba
- Council: Eshkol
- Affiliation: HaOved HaTzioni
- Founded: 1981
- Founder: Evacuated settlers
- Population (2024): 388

Pri Gan (Hebrew: פְּרִי גַּן, lit. 'Fruit Garden'), also known as Prigan, is a moshav in southern Israel. Located in the Hevel Shalom area of the north-western Negev desert, it falls under the jurisdiction of Eshkol Regional Council. In 2024 it had a population of 388.

== History ==
The moshav was founded in 1981 by former residents of Pri'el, an Israeli settlement in Sinai which was evacuated as part of the Egyptian-Israeli Peace Treaty. Its main produce is vegetables and flowers.

Pri Gan was targeted during 2023 Hamas-led attack on Israel. Eleven members of the security team from nearby Shlomit came to defend the moshav, five of whom were killed during fighting. However, no residents were killed.
