= Ohad, Israel =

Moshav in southern Israel

Ohad: אוהד (Hebrew)
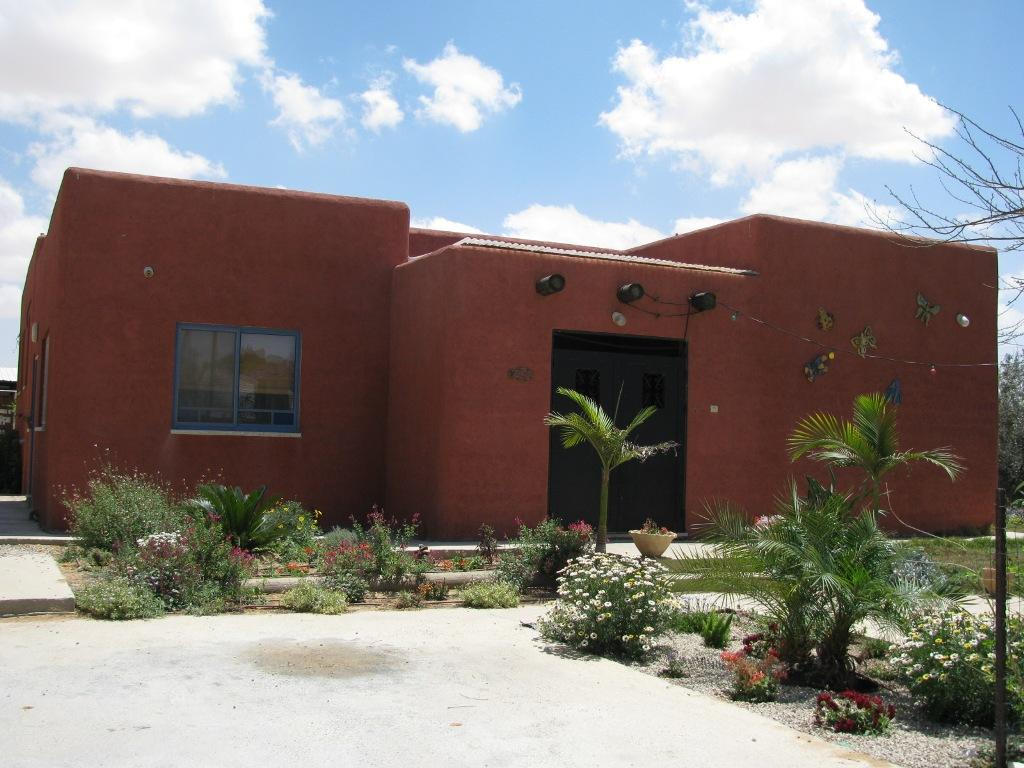

- Location within Northwest Negev region of Israel
- Coordinates: 31°14′13″N 34°25′56″E
- Country: Israel
- District: Southern
- Subdistrict: Beersheba
- Council: Eshkol
- Affiliation: Moshavim Movement
- Founded: 1969
- Population (2024): 714

Ohad (Hebrew: אֹהַד or אוהד) is a moshav in southern Israel. Located in the Hevel Eshkol area of the north-western Negev desert near the Gaza Strip border, it falls under the jurisdiction of Eshkol Regional Council. In 2024 it had a population of 714.

== History ==
The village was founded in 1969 by immigrants from various countries and was named after Ohad, the third son of Shim'on (Simeon), mentioned in the Bible (Genesis 46:10), with the neighbouring communal settlement Tzohar named after his brother, mentioned in the same biblical verse.
