= Dekel =

Moshav in southern Israel

Dekel: דֶּקֶל (Hebrew)
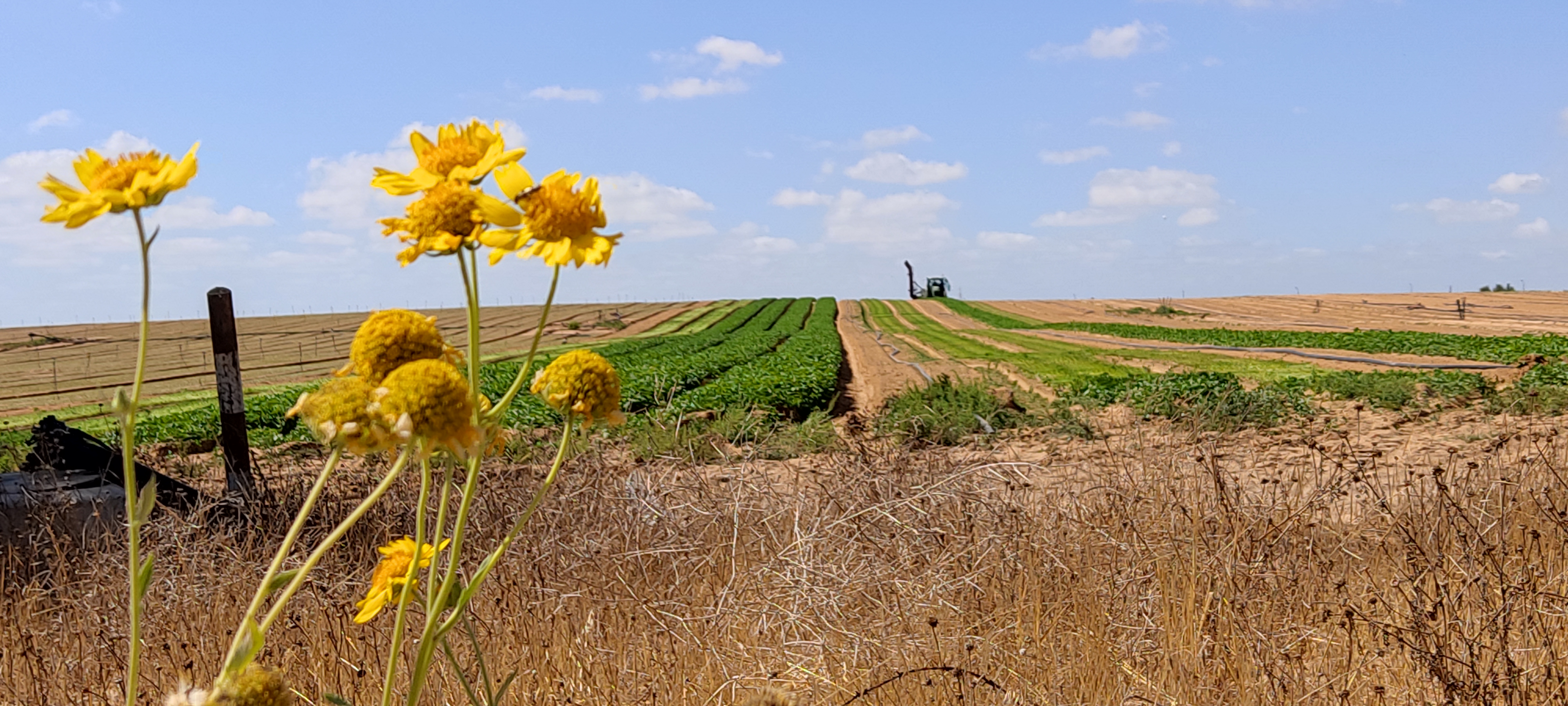

- Location within Northwest Negev region of Israel
- Coordinates: 31°11′41″N 34°20′55″E
- Country: Israel
- District: Southern
- Subdistrict: Beersheba
- Council: Eshkol
- Affiliation: Agricultural Union
- Founded: April 1982
- Founder: Jewish Agency for Israel
- Population (2024): 453

Dekel (Hebrew: דֶּקֶל, lit. 'Palm tree'), officially Dekel-Kfar Shitufi (Hebrew: דקל-כפר שיתופי, lit. 'Dekel - Co-operative Village') is a moshav in southern Israel. Located in the Hevel Shalom area of the north-western Negev desert near the Egypt-Gaza Strip-Israel border, it falls under the jurisdiction of Eshkol Regional Council. In 2024 it had a population of 453.

== History ==
A Nahal settlement by the name of Dekel was established in the area in 1956, but was abandoned after the Suez Crisis later in the year. A gar'in group by the same name was formed in the Israeli settlement of Yamit in 1979. However, its establishment on the ground was delayed by the Camp David Accords which meant that Israel had to withdraw from Sinai. The moshav was founded in April 1982 by the eponymous Aguda Shitufit (Co-operative Union) with the help of the Jewish Agency.
