= Sde Nitzan =

Sde Nitzan: שדה ניצן (Hebrew)
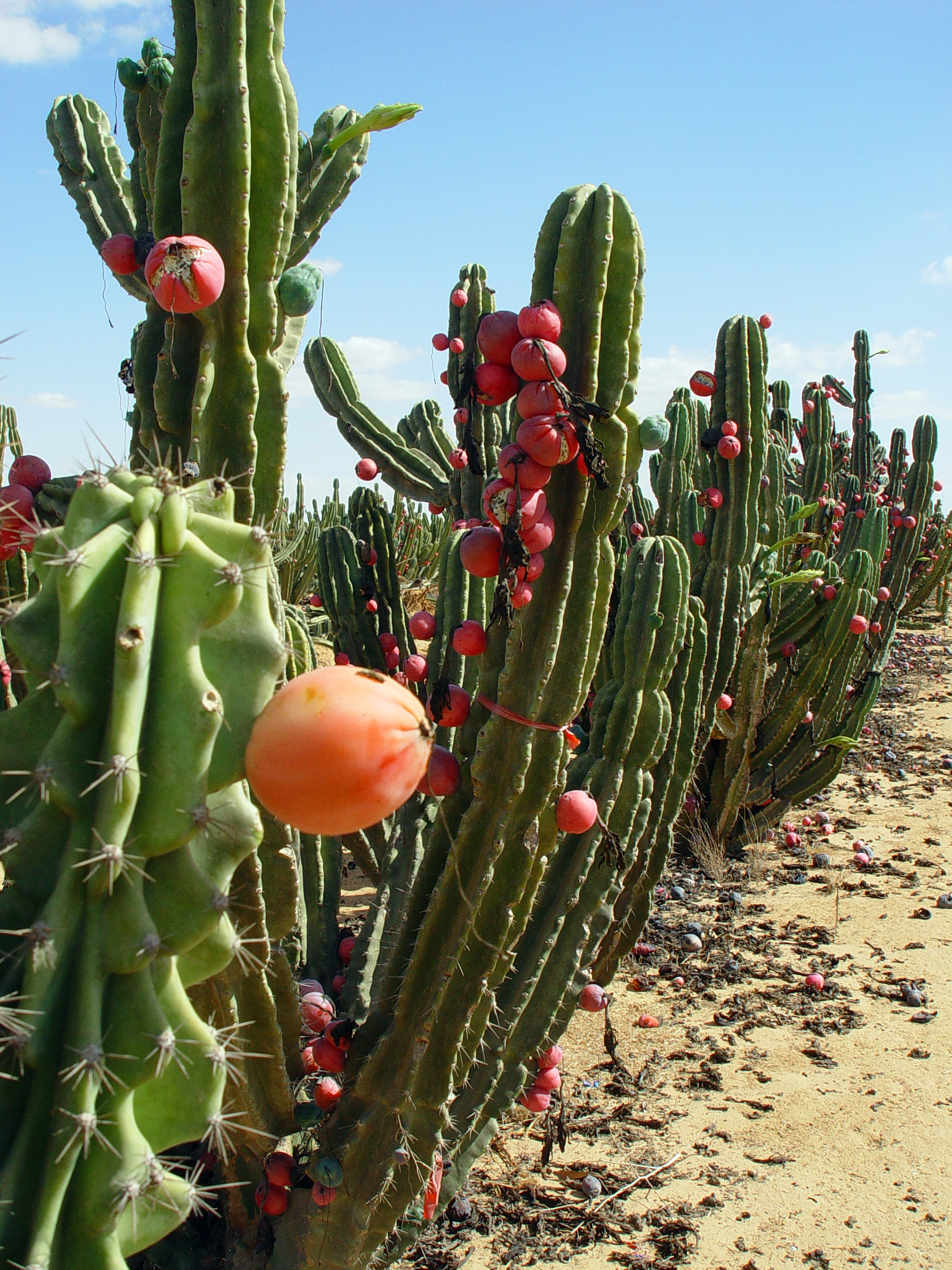
- Cereus repandus fruits in Sde Nitzan
- Etymology: Field of (Flower) Buds
- Location within Northwest Negev region of Israel
- Coordinates: 31°13′45″N 34°25′12″E
- Country: Israel
- District: Southern
- Subdistrict: Beersheba
- Council: Eshkol
- Affiliation: Moshavim Movement
- Founded: 1973
- Founder: English-speaking Jewish immigrants
- Population (2024): 550

Sde Nitzan (Hebrew: שְׂדֵה נִצָּן, lit. Field of (Flower) Buds) is a moshav in the northern Negev desert in Israel. Located twelve kilometres east of Kerem Shalom, 8 km east of Gaza Strip and 35 km west of Beersheba, it falls under the jurisdiction of Eshkol Regional Council. In 2024 it had a population of 550.

== History ==
The moshav was established in 1973 by immigrants from English speaking countries, with the name being an approximate translation of the name of a Jewish philanthropist named Bloomfield ("Field of Flowers").
