= Holit =

Kibbutz in southern Israel

Holit: חוֹלִית (Hebrew); حوليت (Arabic)
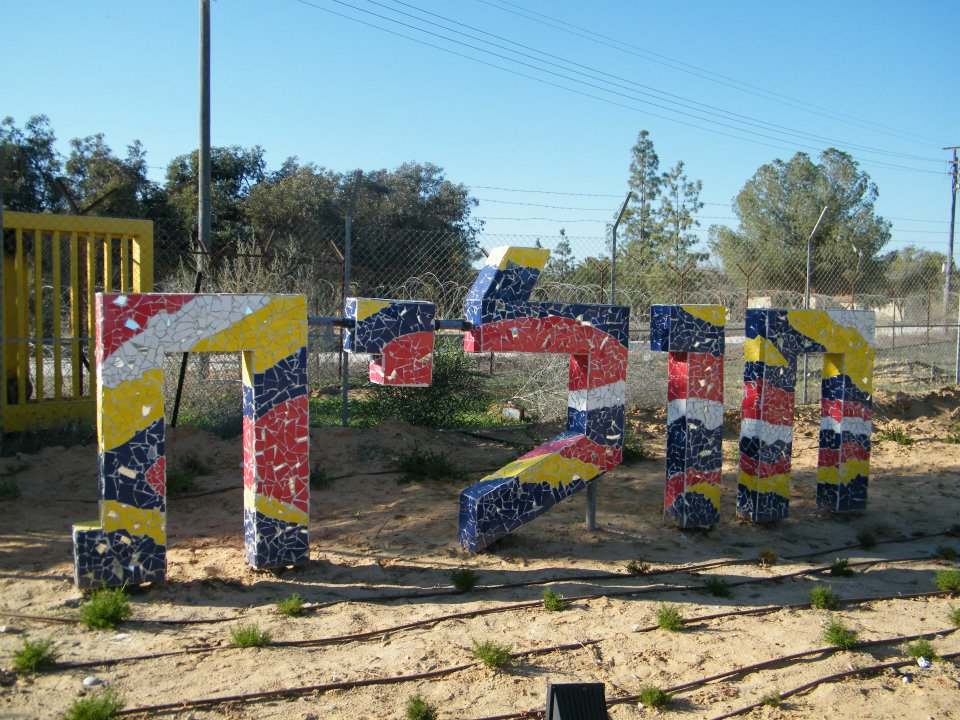
- Entrance to kibbutz Holit
- Etymology: Dune
- Location within Northwest Negev region of Israel
- Coordinates: 31°13′48″N 34°19′36″E
- Country: Israel
- District: Southern
- Subdistrict: Beersheba
- Council: Eshkol
- Affiliation: Kibbutz Movement
- Founded: 1978 (in Sinai); 1982 (current location)
- Founder: Nahal
- Population (2024): 223

Holit (Hebrew: חוֹלִית, lit. 'Dune') is a kibbutz in the Hevel Shalom region of south-west Israel. Located near Nir Yitzhak, the kibbutz is under the jurisdiction of Eshkol Regional Council. In 2024, it had a population of 223.

== History ==
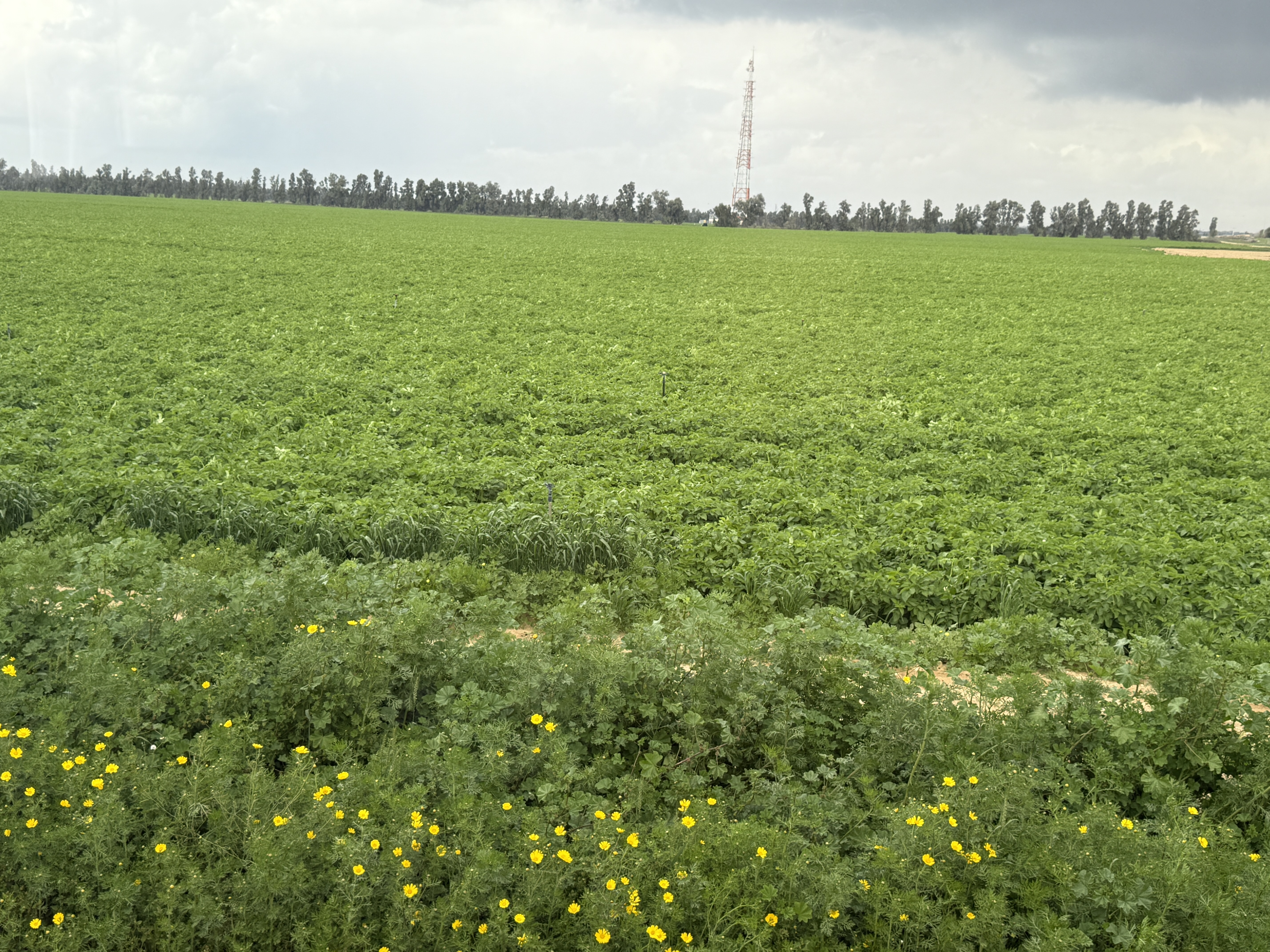
Fields near Holit.

The kibbutz was established in 1978 as a Nahal settlement near Yamit, in the Sinai Peninsula. However, as a result of the Israel-Egypt Peace Treaty in 1979, Israel was required to evacuate all its settlements in the peninsula.

In 1982, the kibbutz was re-established in its current location.

The Holit attack was perpetrated by Hamas militants on 7 October 2023 in kibbutz Holit, as part of the October 7 surprise attack on Israel. Hamas killed at least 11 members of the kibbutz and two migrant workers. Among the casualties were at least two American citizens. A women's tank platoon of the Caracal Battalion was crucial in the recapturing of the kibbutz.

== Economy ==
Holit's economy is based on agriculture and industry, with three main sources of income: the cattle farm, factory, and crop production. The factory produces juicers, about 50 a week. Oranges, lemons, potatoes, mangos, nuts and carrots are all grown in the fields and orchards.
