= Talmei Eliyahu =

Talmei Eliyahu: תַּלְמֵי אֵלִיָּהוּ (Hebrew)
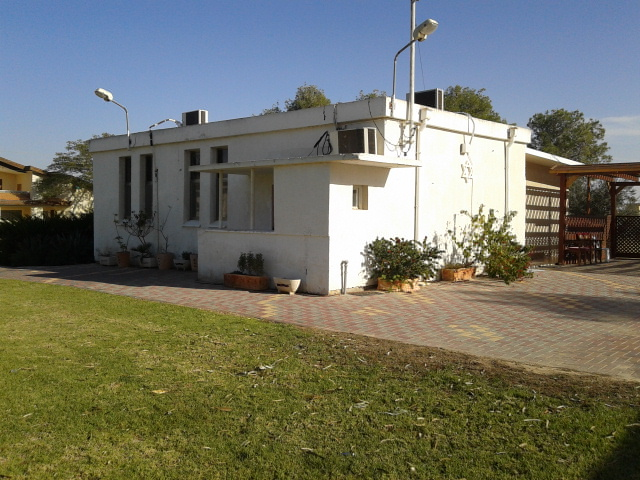
- Village synagogue

- Location within Northwest Negev region of Israel
- Coordinates: 31°13′54″N 34°25′44″E
- Country: Israel
- District: Southern
- Subdistrict: Beersheba
- Council: Eshkol
- Affiliation: Moshavim Movement
- Founded: 1970
- Founder: French immigrants
- Population (2024): 480

Talmei Eliyahu (Hebrew: תַּלְמֵי אֵלִיָּהוּ, lit. 'Eliyahu Furrows') is a moshav in southern Israel. Located in the Hevel Eshkol area of the north-western Negev desert, it falls under the jurisdiction of Eshkol Regional Council. In 2024 it had a population of 480.

== History ==
The moshav was founded in 1970 by immigrants from France and was named after Eliyahu Krauze, a former head of the Mikveh Israel agricultural school. It was founded as a collective moshav and became a workers' moshav in 1974.
