= Avshalom, Israel =

Community settlement in southern Israel

Avshalom: אבשלום (Hebrew)
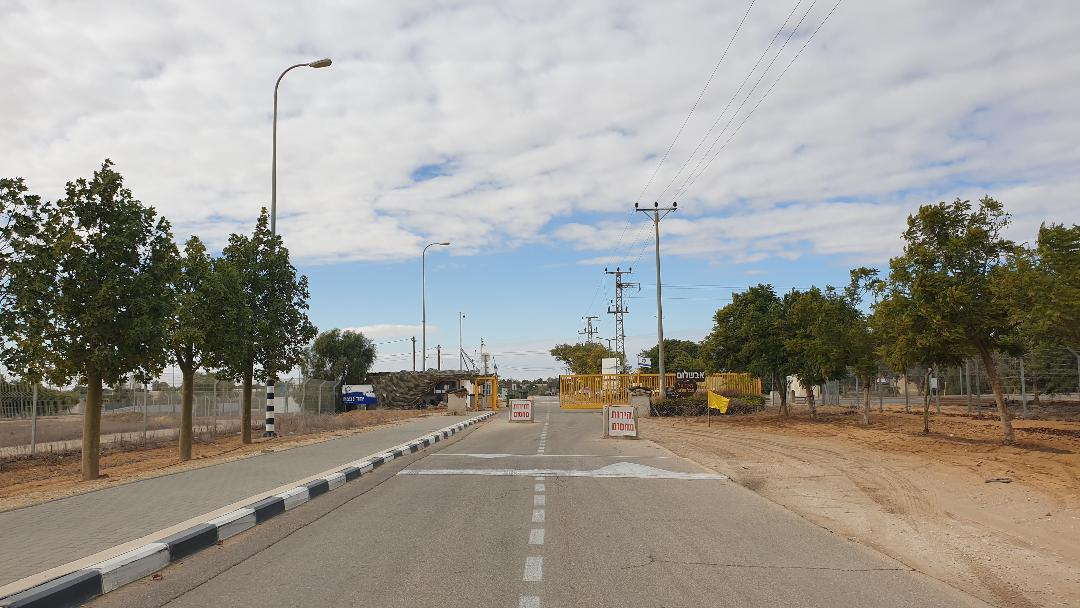

- Location within Northwest Negev region of Israel Location within Israel
- Coordinates: 31°11′43″N 34°19′54″E
- Country: Israel
- District: Southern
- Subdistrict: Beersheba
- Council: Eshkol
- Founded: 1990
- Founder: Russian Jews
- Population (2024): 422

Avshalom (Hebrew: אבשלום) is a community settlement and regional centre in southern Israel. Located near the Egypt – Gaza Strip border, it falls under the jurisdiction of Eshkol Regional Council. In 2024 it had a population of 422.

== History ==
Founded in 1990, the settlement was named after Avshalom Feinberg, a member of the Nili spy ring who was killed in 1917 on his way to rendezvous with British forces in the northern Sinai, not far from the village's location. It was initially a caravan site for immigrants from the former Soviet Union who wanted to be absorbed into the Hevel Shalom settlements. In 1997, as these settlements refused to absorb them, it became a permanent settlement, with most of the residents working in nearby settlements.

Next to Highway 232, about 3 km west of Avshalom junction, lies the Ugdat HaPlada Monument, commemorating the casualties of the 84th Armored Division who died during the Six-Day War. The monument, designed by the architect Israel Gudovich, was erected at Yamit in 1977. After the Israeli withdrawal from the Sinai it was rebuilt at its present location using the same design.

== See also ==
- Avshalom, Sinai
