= Yated, Israel =

Residential moshav in Israel

Yated: יָתֵד (Hebrew); يتد (Arabic)
- Location within Northwest Negev region of Israel
- Coordinates: 31°12′22″N 34°19′36″E
- Country: Israel
- District: Southern
- Subdistrict: Beersheba
- Council: Eshkol
- Affiliation: Moshavim Movement
- Founded: 1982
- Founder: Gar'in
- Population (2024): 996

Yated (Hebrew: יָתֵד, lit. Stake) is a moshav in southern Israel. Located in Hevel Shalom, it falls under the jurisdiction of Eshkol Regional Council. In 2024 it had a population of 996.

== History ==
The moshav was founded in 1982 by a Gar'in who intended to settle in Sinai.

When the moshav was established, there were 96 agricultural plots, but in practice, not all of them were inhabited. In March 1999, the District Committee for Planning and Construction in the Southern District approved for deposit a new plan for the residential complex of the moshav, after it was also approved by the Committee for the Preservation of Agricultural Land and Open Areas. The purpose of the plan was to increase the population of the settlement through a non-agricultural expansion, within the framework of the Build Your Home project, of 110 lots with a maximum area of 600 square meters each, by utilizing uncultivated areas in the area at the entrance to the village. The expansion was finally approved in May 2000.

In 2008, there were only 50 families and vacant properties in the settlement, and an operation began to market 24 vacant lots at a cost of 30,000 dollars.

On 7 October during the 2023 Hamas-led attack on Israel terrorists, who were repelled, tried in vain to infiltrate the moshav.

Most of the members of the moshav are engaged in advanced agriculture in greenhouses, growing vegetables and flowers. and the other part in private or business entrepreneurship and education.
