= Eshkol Regional Council =

Coordinates: 31°18′10″N 34°25′53″E

Eshkol אשכול إشكول
- Regional council (from 1951)
- Interactive map of Eshkol
- Country: Israel
- District: Southern
- Subdistrict: Beersheba
- Natural region: Besor

Government
  - Head of Municipality: Gadi Yarkoni

Area
  - Total: 735,520 dunams (735.52 km^{2}; 283.99 sq mi)

Population (2024)
  - Total: 19,886
  - Density: 27.037/km^{2} (70.025/sq mi)
- Website: Official website

Eshkol Regional Council (Hebrew: מועצה אזורית אשכול, Mo'atza Ezorit Eshkol) is a regional council in the north-western Negev, in Israel's Southern District. Located within the zone known as the Gaza envelope, the regional council's territory is situated east of the Gaza Strip, stretching in the area between Ashkelon to the north and Beersheba to the east.

Due to its direct proximity to the Gaza Strip, the region has been the target of thousands of rocket attacks, mortar strikes, and incendiary balloon fires since 2000. The council area served as a primary locale of the 2023 October 7 attacks, bearing the brunt of a massive, coordinated invasion by thousands of Hamas militants that included multiple devastating assaults within its territory, such as the Nova music festival massacre, the Nir Oz attack, and the Be'eri massacre.

== Transport ==
Eshkol Regional Council is linked to Tel Aviv by bus routes 379 (local) and route 479 (express), to Be'er Sheva by bus route 35, to Ashkelon by bus route 36 and to Jerusalem by bus 495. Inside the regional council's territory there are six bus routes linking the kibbutzim and the moshavim to the regional council offices. All bus routes are operated by Dan BaDarom.

== Security ==
The Eshkol region has been the target of thousands of rocket attacks since 2000. Despite Iron Dome coverage in the region, usage of the system is generally limited to populated areas and allows other rockets to land in open areas. As a result, there has been widespread damage to farms, vehicles and various outlying structures. During the 2014 Israel–Gaza conflict, farmers reported massive damages to their crops due to rockets landing in open fields.

On 26 August 2014 a mortar shell fired from Gaza killed two people and seriously wounded a third on Kibbutz Nirim, in the Eshkol Regional Council.

Since 2016, the region has experienced waves of fires caused by incendiary balloons released from Gaza. The fires have caused widespread damage to farms and local infrastructure. More than 100 fires were reported in June 2019 alone, with reported damage to at least 4,500 acres of farmland. This tactic by Hamas and other militant groups in Gaza (Palestinian Islamic Jihad) is considered to be a form of agro-terrorism.

During the October 7 attacks multiple attacks occurred in the regional council, including the Nova music festival massacre, the Nir Oz attack, and the Be'eri massacre.

== Villages ==
=== Kibbutzim ===
- Be'eri
- Ein HaShlosha
- Gvulot
- Magen
- Nir Oz
- Nir Yitzhak
- Nirim
- Holit
- Kerem Shalom
- Kissufim
- Re'im
- Sufa
- Tze'elim
- Urim

=== Moshavim ===
- Ami'oz
- Bnei Netzarim
- Dekel
- Ein HaBesor
- Mivtahim
- Naveh
- Ohad
- Pri Gan
- Sdei Avraham
- Sde Nitzan
- Talmei Eliyahu
- Talmei Yosef
- Yated
- Yesha
- Yevul

=== Other locations ===
- Avshalom
- Tzohar
- Shlomit

== Demographics ==
Historical population
Year	Pop.	±%
1972	2,400	—
1983	5,200	+116.7%
1995	6,500	+25.0%
2008	10,510	+61.7%
2022	18,226	+73.4%
2024	19,886	+9.1%

== Voting Patterns ==
In the 2022 election, 64 percent of voters in the regional council voted for the parties of the center-left coalition led by Yair Lapid, while 35 percent voted for the parties of the right-wing coalition led by Benjamin Netanyahu and 0.5 percent voted for the Arab parties.

In the 2026 election, 57 percent of voters in the regional council voted for the parties of the center-left coalition led by Gadi Eisenkot, while 31 percent voted for the parties of the right-wing coalition led by Benjamin Netanyahu and 0.4 percent voted for the Arab parties. An additional 3.4 percent voted for the Reservists, and 2.4 percent voted for Amcha Yisrael. Voter turnout increased 6 percent from the 2022 election.
