= Shlomit =

Shlomit: שלומית (Hebrew)
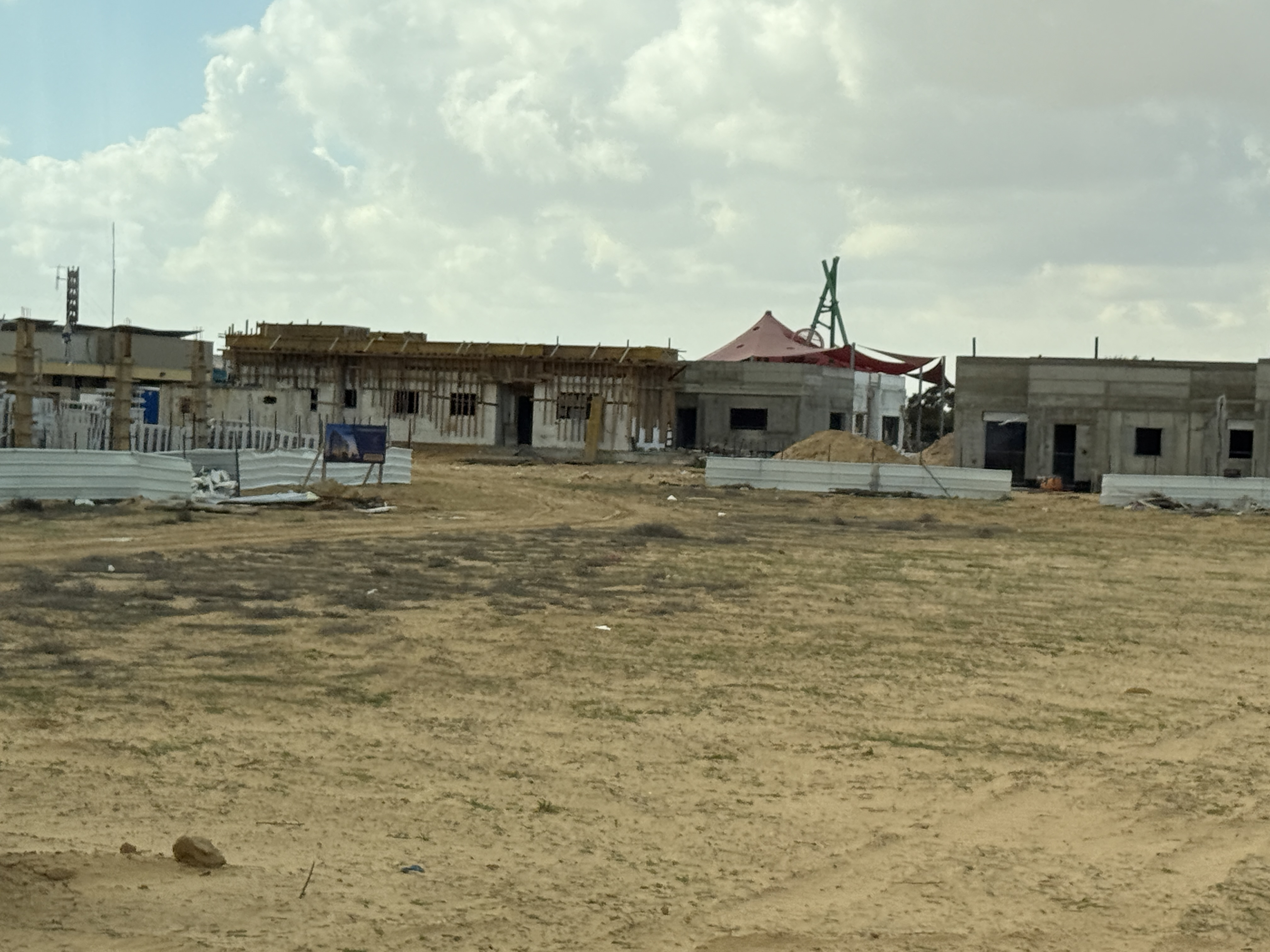
- Shlomit in 2025

- Location within Northwest Negev region of Israel Location within Israel
- Coordinates: 31°10′6″N 34°18′17″E
- Country: Israel
- District: Southern
- Subdistrict: Beersheba
- Council: Eshkol
- Affiliation: Amana
- Founded: 2011
- Founder: Bnei Atzmon; Mechina alumni
- Population (2024): 675

Shlomit (Hebrew: שלומית) is a community settlement in southern Israel. Located in the Negev desert, around 700 meters from the Egyptian border, it falls under the jurisdiction of Eshkol Regional Council. In 2024, it had a population of 675.

During the Iron Swords War, four residents of Shlomit were killed while fighting to defend nearby communities.

== History ==
Shlomit was established in cooperation with Amana, the Ministry for the Development of the Negev and Galilee, and the Defense Ministry's settlement and national infrastructure unit. It initially consisted of mobile structures expected to be replaced by permanent housing. An industrial zone and educational institutions are also planned to be built there, alongside housing for 500 residents.

Jewish National Fund Argentina is a major contributor to the development of Shlomit.
