= Talmei Yosef =

Place in Southern Israel

Talmei Yosef: תַּלְמֵי יוֹסֵף (Hebrew)
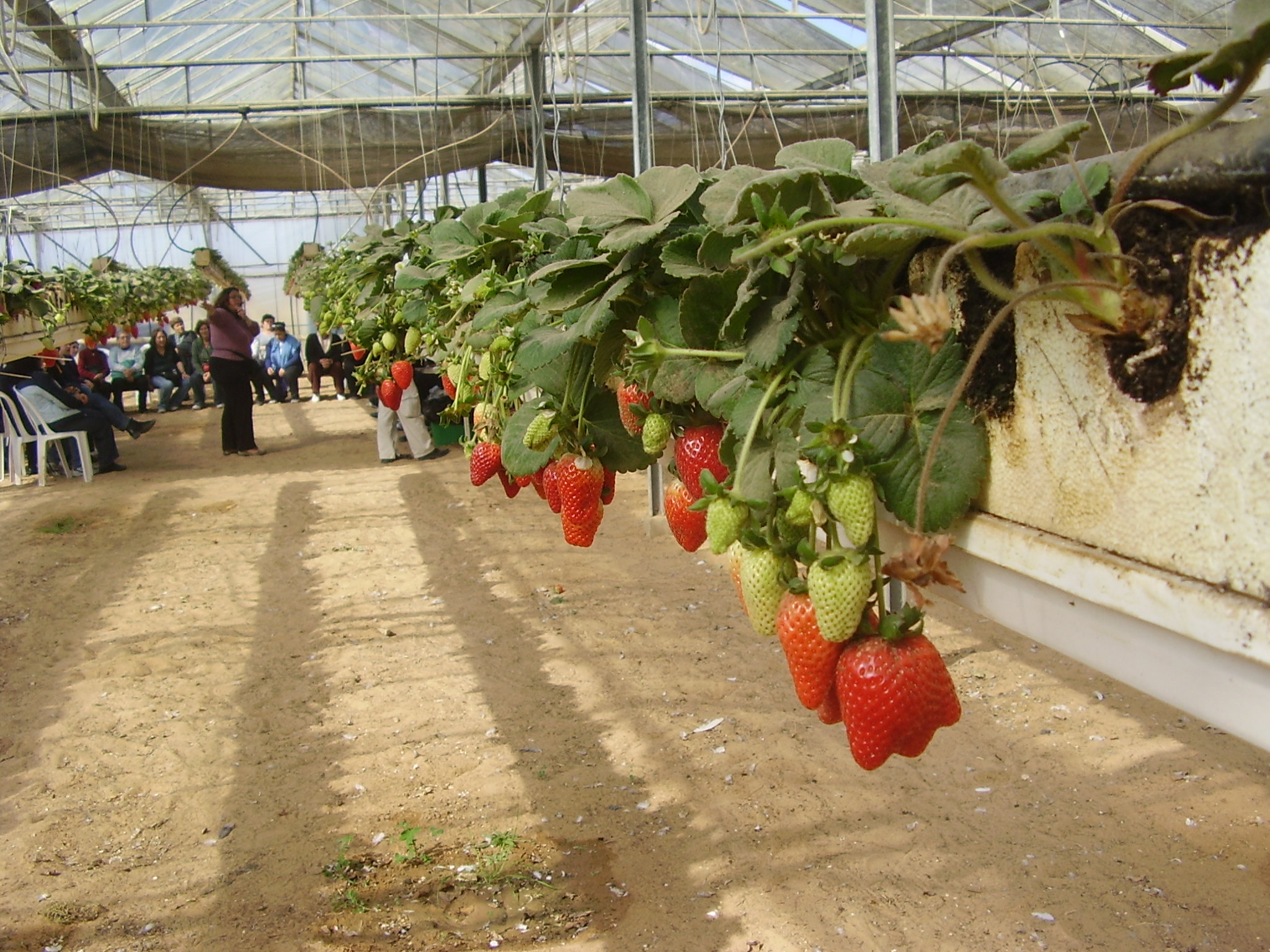
- Etymology: 'Joseph Furrows'
- Location within Northwest Negev region of Israel Location within Israel
- Coordinates: 31°12′0″N 34°21′51″E
- Country: Israel
- District: Southern
- Subdistrict: Beersheba
- Council: Eshkol
- Affiliation: Agricultural Union
- Founded: 1982
- Founder: Evacuated settlers
- Population (2024): 517

Talmei Yosef (Hebrew: תַּלְמֵי יוֹסֵף, lit. 'Joseph Furrows') is a moshav in southern Israel. Located in the Hevel Shalom area of the north-western Negev desert near the Gaza Strip border, it falls under the jurisdiction of Eshkol Regional Council. In 2024, it had a population of 517.

== History ==
The moshav was established in 1982 by former residents of Talmei Yosef, an Israeli settlement in Sinai. The original settlement's residents were evacuated as a result of the Camp David Accords, and re-settled in Israel, naming their new settlement after their previous one (after Yosef Weitz, a former director of the Land and Afforestation Department of the Jewish National Fund).

In May 2015 Jewish National Fund Belgium established a green landscaping project around the local synagogue in memory of Yilona Nejszaten, one of the "hidden children" of the Holocaust.

In 2005 a moshav resident opened an educational farm called the "Salad Trail." Visitors see how Israel's agricultural technologies allow over 80 different crops, primarily fruits and vegetables, to grow in the desert soil – without pesticides.

== See also ==
- Desert farming
- Agriculture in Israel
