= Hevel Eshkol =

Region of the Negev Desert in Israel

Hevel Eshkol

Hevel Eshkol (Hebrew: חבל אשכול, lit. Eshkol region) is an area in the western Negev close to Israel's border with the Gaza Strip and Egypt's Sinai. Hevel Eshkol is bordering the Gaza Strip and the Israel–Egypt border in the west, Netivot and the Sdot Negev Regional Council in the north, Ofakim and the Merhavim Regional Council in the east, and Holot Halutza in the south.

The region's villages are spread out on both sides of Besor Stream, and therefore were called until 1969 "Hevel HaBesor". Another previous name was "Hevel Ma'on". In the 2000s, the region was named after Levi Eshkol, who was the third Prime Minister of the State of Israel.

== Geology and population ==
The soils of Eshkol region, which are a mixture of sand and loam, were found to be suitable for field crops such as carrots and potatoes. This area is managed by the Eshkol Regional Council, whose seat is in the regional center next to Magen Junction. There are 32 villages in Hevel Eshkol, of which 14 are kibbutzim, 15 moshavim and 3 community settlements. Among the villages you can find some of The 11 points and the Three lookouts, which were established before the establishment of Israel. The population of the area is about 10,000.

== Climate ==
Eshkol region is characterized by a lack of rainfall and a hot summer. The average precipitation in the region is 217 mm per season. In August, the temperature can reach 40 °C or higher, and in January, the average temperature hovers around 10 degrees Celsius.

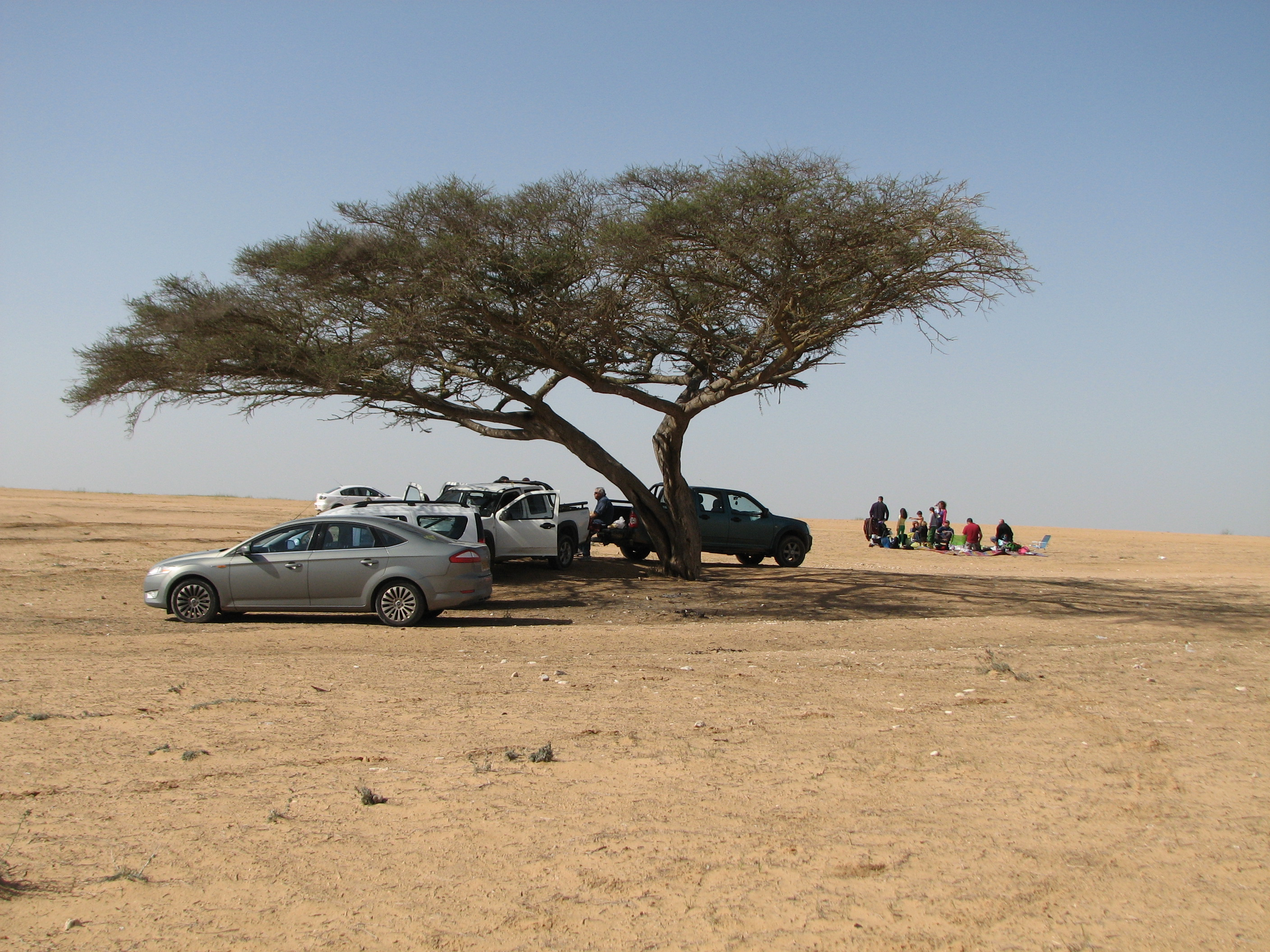

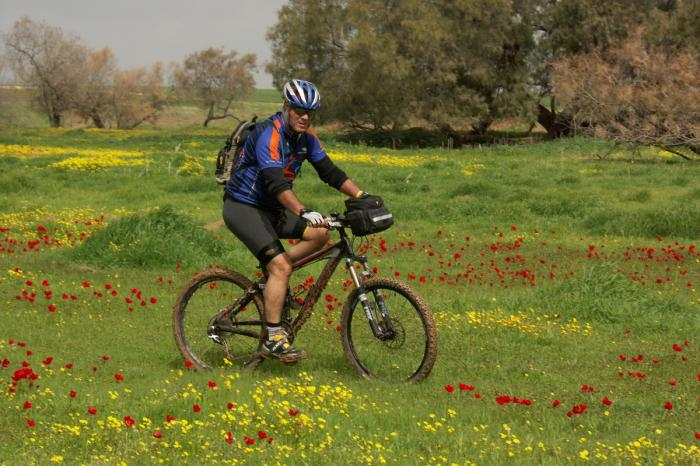
