= Naomi Gal (artist) =

Canadian artist and human-rights activist (born 1978)

Naomi Gal (born 1978) is a Canadian artist and human-rights advocate, notable for her hand-drawn portrait sketches and illustrated books honoring Israeli hostages taken during the October 7, 2023, Hamas attacks.

Her work seeks to amplify individual stories and maintain global awareness of hostage crises and antisemitism. Her art has been featured in international exhibitions and media, and she regularly speaks on topics of memory, faith, and activism.

== Personal life ==
Naomi Gal was born in Toronto, Canada , where she currently resides. She is one of nine siblings and a mother to six children. As the granddaughter of four Holocaust survivors, Gal's personal history and commitment to Jewish memory deeply inform her artistic and advocacy work.

== Career and artistic work ==
=== Hostage portraits and illustrated books ===
In February 2024, Gal began creating daily pen and marker sketches of the Israeli hostages and victims. By early June 2025, she had produced over one hundred illustrated books. Her illustrations have garnered public attention at rallies throughout North America and Europe, and were also featured during demonstrations and cultural events, including the Nova Exhibition commemorating the Nova music festival massacre.

=== Exhibitions and public presentations ===
Gal's work has been showcased in international exhibitions such as in Herzliya and Barcelona. Gal's exhibitions are complemented by speaking events hosted at synagogues, Jewish day schools, university Hillels, and cultural institutions, where she presents intimate storytelling paired with her artwork.

In January 2026, Forbes Argentina published a profile on Gal’s work documenting civilians taken hostage during the October 7 attacks. The article described her hand drawn portraits and accompanying written narratives, as well as the presentation of the project in printed formats such as books and small publications. It also noted the international reach of the project through exhibitions and public events in Buenos Aires, and its visibility through social media and press coverage.

In February 2026, The Uruguayan publication El Observador profiled Gal's artistic work and her growing connection to Argentina. The article described how her portrait drawings of Israeli hostages gained attention online and later led to a series of portraits of Argentine president Javier Milei. It also reported that Gal expanded her work in Argentina to include projects related to Argentine culture and an exhibition at the Argentine National Congress during the building's 120th anniversary celebrations.
