= Psyduck music festival massacre =

2023 mass murder in southern Israel

- Part of the October 7 attacks
- Native name: הטבח במסיבת פסיידאק
- Location: 31°19′20″N 34°24′00″E; Eshkol Regional Council, Israel
- Date: 7 October 2023; 3 years ago Starting c. 7 am (UTC+3)
- Target: Civilians
- Attack type: Mass shooting
- Weapons: Firearms including AK-type assault rifles, hand grenades
- Deaths: 17
- Perpetrators: al-Qassam Brigades; Al-Quds Brigades

Psyduck was a small trance music festival that took place in the open fields between Kibbutz Nir Oz and Kibbutz Nirim, about 2 kilometres (1.2 miles) from the border of Gaza. The rave hosted about 100 participants. On 7 October 2023 morning, as part of the surprise attack on Israel, the Qassam Brigades (the militant wing of the Hamas party) attacked the Psyduck festival, killing 17 Israeli partygoers.

== Gathering ==
For five years, Psyduck music gatherings were held once every two months, with the location of the party kept a secret. In many cases, even the organizers didn't know where the party would take place until right before the event began. The 2023 location was a pastoral-looking wadi between Nir Oz and Nirim, was chosen by one of the party organizers, Moshe Amzaleg, from Tifrah in Eshkol regional council. The party was arranged as a covert gathering, funded by the participants and without police authorization and undisclosed to the authorities.

Approximately 100 people took part in the event, which was considerably smaller compared to the well-known Nova festival near Re'im.

== Attack ==
The festival began at approximately midnight on 6 October. In the early hours of 7 October, a barrage of rockets was launched while attendees were dancing. According to survivor testimony, a motorized paraglider operated by Hamas militants approached the festival area but did not attack the attendees at that time. Subsequently, Palestinian militants entered the area on foot and in motor vehicles after crossing from the Gaza Strip. As the gunfire intensified, some festival participants attempted to flee, while others remained in hiding until the arrival of the Israel Defense Forces several hours later.

Some of those who decided to flee encountered Al-Qassam militants, and were killed while trying to escape on the roads, in shelters, or at nearby kibbuzim, Nirim, Nir-Oz and Kissufim. In total, seventeen of the festival participants were killed.

== Aftermath ==
The National Insurance Institute formally recognized the experiences and trauma of the survivors of the Psyduck festival. Survivors can submit claims for recognition as victims of work-related injuries and as casualties of hostile actions. They are entitled to several benefits, such as financial assistance, medical and psychological support, legal aid and compensation for any lost or damaged property.

Family members of victims of the two festivals gathered to create the Party Youth Forum, to demand the immediate establishment of a third party committee to investigate any potential negligence leading up to the 7 October attacks.

== See also ==
- Outline of the Gaza war
- List of massacres in Israel
- List of terrorist incidents in 2023
- Palestinian terrorism
- Nova music festival massacre
