= Oren Solomon =

- Native name: אורן סולומון
- Allegiance: Israel
- Branch: Israel Defense Forces
- Service years: 1990–2016 (active), reserve service thereafter
- Rank: Brigadier general (res.)
- Commands: Yiftah Brigade

Oren Solomon (Hebrew: אורן סולומון) is a Israel Defense Forces reserve officer with the rank of Brigadier general. He commanded the Yiftah Brigade and served as Head of Combat Operations of the Gaza Division in the reserves, including during the Israel–Hamas war.

On 7 October 2023, during the Nova music festival massacre, Solomon, acting as a civilian and alongside his son and several police officers, engaged in prolonged combat against Nukhba forces. Their actions delayed the attackers during Hamas’s assault on the festival and contributed to saving the lives of many participants.

== Biography ==
Solomon was conscripted into the IDF in 1990 and served in the Israeli Armored Corps. Between 1994 and 2011 he held a series of command positions, including company commander in the 46th Battalion of the 401st Brigade, deputy commander of the 82nd Battalion of the 7th Armored Brigade, commander of the 71st Battalion in the 188th Brigade, deputy commander of the 460th Armored Brigade, and reserve commander of the Yiftah Brigade.

Additional roles included training officer of the 36th Division, military secretary to the Commander of the Northern Command (then Benny Gantz), Head of the Southern Arena in the Operations Directorate, divisional chief of staff, and deputy commander of the National Ground Training Center (2014–2016).

After his discharge from active duty in 2016, Solomon began doctoral studies focusing on changes in Israel’s national security concept. In 2019 he was appointed Head of the Security Doctrine and Force Employment Division at the National Security Council, serving until mid-2021. Concurrently, he served as Head of Combat Operations of the Gaza Division, the most senior operational role in a division headquarters after the division commander. During this period, he directed the division’s combat activity across multiple rounds of fighting and received a commendation during Operation Guardian of the Walls.

=== Role during the Re'im music festival massacre ===
At the outset of the 7 October attacks, Solomon and his son, then an intelligence officer in the Gaza Division’s Northern Brigade, armed with pistols, departed their home in Kibbutz Sa'ad toward the conflict zone. After several engagements, they reached the area of the Nova music festival massacre.

Together with a small number of police officers, Solomon commanded and fought in prolonged engagements along Highway 232, slowing the militants’ advance, preventing additional abductions, and evacuating hundreds of civilians under fire. He later mounted an abandoned tank and used its machine gun to repel further attacks, directed aerial reconnaissance assets, coordinated incoming forces, and oversaw casualty evacuation.

=== Israel–Hamas war ===
Following the battles at Re'im, Solomon continued to serve as Head of Combat Operations of the Gaza Division for approximately eighteen months during the Israel–Hamas war. He was also tasked with leading the multi-level internal investigations into IDF performance. Following the inquiry, Solomon publicly alleged severe failures at both the General Staff and command levels, claiming that some investigations were whitewashed to obscure senior responsibility.

In March 2025, the Military Police Criminal Investigation Division opened an investigation into Solomon on suspicion of information security violations, alleging that he had removed classified documents at the outset of the war. During the investigation, the commander of the Gaza Division, Barak Hiram, terminated Solomon's role, and responsibility for the division's inquiry was transferred to another officer in coordination with former Southern Command head Yaron Finkelman.

On 6 October 2025, the IDF announced that the investigation had been closed due to lack of evidence and that Solomon had been cleared of all suspicion. Solomon accused senior IDF leadership of attempting to silence him by initiating a baseless investigation and sent a letter to Chief of the General Staff Eyal Zamir criticizing Hiram's conduct.

In October–November 2025, Solomon appeared in a three-part television series titled October Investigation, in which he criticized the IDF General Staff's handling of the 7 October attacks and accused then-Chief of Staff Herzi Halevi of attempting to suppress his findings.

== Public activity ==
Solomon is a member of the HaBitachonistim movement, the Forum of Reserve Commanders and Fighters, and serves on the executive board of the Reservists – Generation of Victory organization. Since the outbreak of the war, he has frequently appeared in Israeli media, including Kan 11, Channel 12, i24NEWS, Channel 14, Kikar HaShabbat, and Arutz Sheva.

== Personal life ==
Solomon is married and the father of seven children. He resides in Kibbutz Sa'ad. He holds an LL.B. from the College of Management Academic Studies and a master's degree in diplomacy and security studies for senior officials from Tel Aviv University.
