= Tkuma, Israel =

Moshav in southern Israel

Tkuma: תקומה (Hebrew)
- Moshav
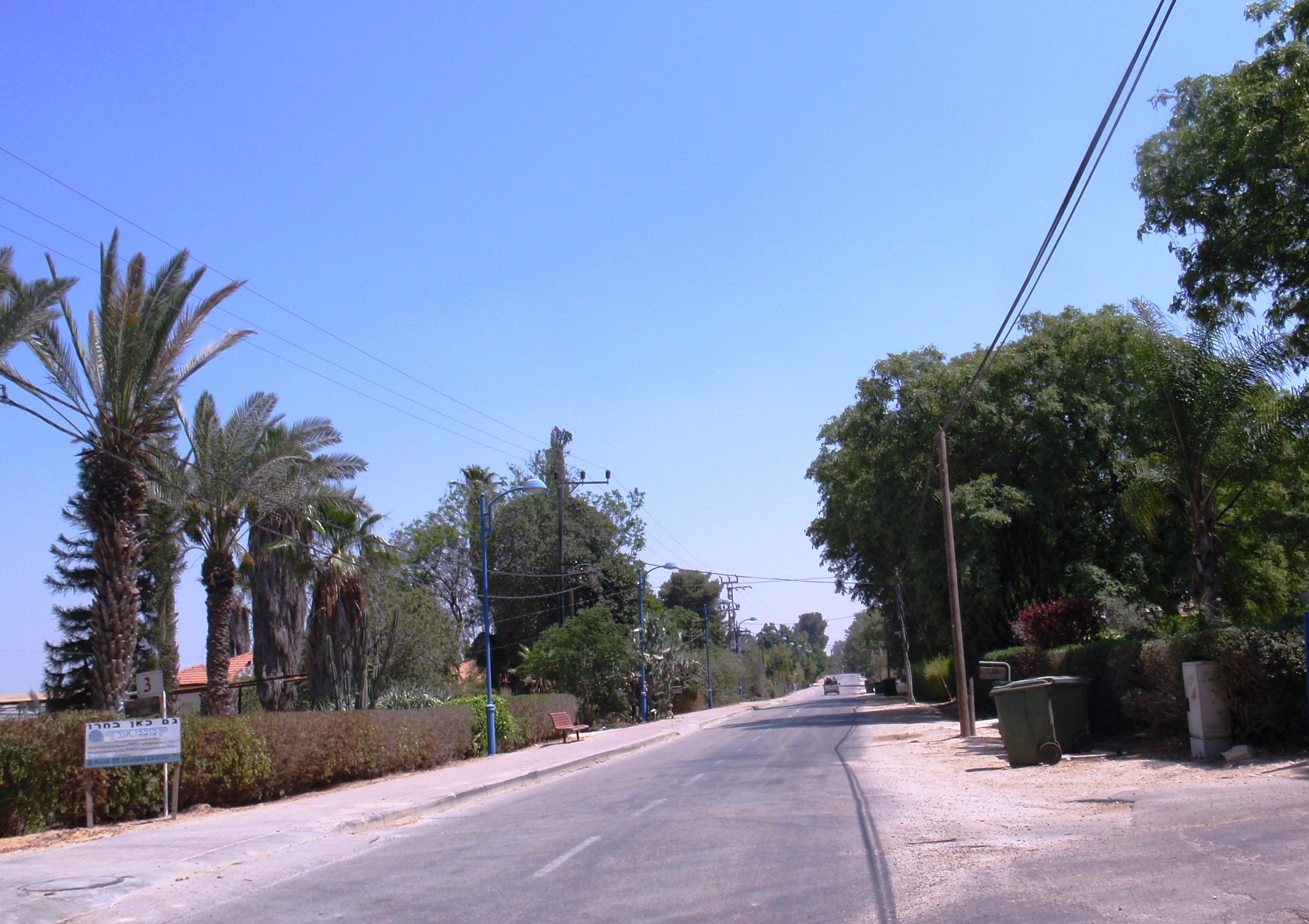
- Etymology: Resurrection
- Location within Northwest Negev region of Israel Location within Israel
- Coordinates: 31.448751°N 34.577422°E
- Country: Israel
- District: Southern
- Subdistrict: Beersheba
- Council: Sdot Negev
- Affiliation: Hapoel HaMizrachi
- Founded: 5–6 October 1946
- Founder: Eastern European Jews
- Population (2024): 906

Tkuma (Hebrew: תקומה, lit. 'Resurrection') is a religious moshav in southern Israel. Located north-west of the city of Netivot, it falls under the jurisdiction of Sdot Negev Regional Council. In 2024 it had a population of 906.

== History ==
Tkuma was established as a kibbutz on the night of 5 and 6 October 1946 as one of the 11 points in the Negev at a location around a mile from the present site. The first residents were Jewish immigrants from Eastern Europe, who survived the Holocaust, and the village's name reflects the resurrection of Israel.

In 1949 the village moved to its present location near the site of the depopulated Palestinian village of al-Muharraqa. Benny Morris documents that Tkuma is near the al-Muharraqa site, but Walid Khalidi says that Tkuma, although only 2 km west of the al-Muharraqa site, is on land which was once used by the city of Gaza.

In the 1950s the moshav was joined by more immigrants from Eastern Europe and Tunisia.

Located five kilometers from the Gaza Strip, the moshav suffered damage from rockets launched by Hamas militants during 2000s and 2010s. The moshav is serviced by the Color Red alert system.

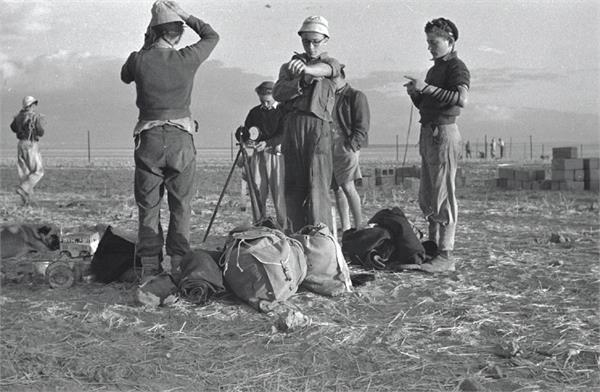
Tkuma morning prayers October 1946

The Car Wall was erected just west of Tkuma, a pile of burnt cars as a memorial for the Re'im music festival massacre on 7 October 2023.

== Economy ==
Since the 1990s fish farming has been an important economic branch. The sale of fresh fish to banquet halls and restaurants in the northern Negev has provided income for several families.

== Archaeology ==
In 1964, at Yizre'am, approximately one kilometre southwest of Tkuma, a clay stamp bearing a Greek inscription was discovered, identifying it as belonging to "Silvanus".
