= Kidnapping of Mia Schem =

Abduction during 2023 Hamas attack on Israel

- Part of 2023 Hamas-led attack on Israel
- Location: Eshkol Regional Council, Israel
- Date: 7 October 2023; 3 years ago
- Attack type: Kidnapping, gunshot, sexual assault
- Victim: Mia Schem
- Perpetrator: Hamas

On 7 October 2023, Mia Schem (Hebrew: מייה שם), a French-Israeli woman, was abducted by Hamas during the Re'im music festival massacre, part of the October 7 attacks. She was held hostage in Gaza for 54 days and appeared in the first hostage video released by Hamas. Her abduction, and subsequent release on 30 November 2023, attracted international media attention, making her one of the most prominent faces of the hostage crisis during the Israel–Hamas war.

== Background ==
Mia Schem was 21 years old at the time of her abduction. She is a French–Israeli citizen who lived in Shoham, Israel, and worked as a tattoo artist at the Liav Tattoo studio. Her maternal grandfather, Zeev Scharf, is an 83-year-old Chilean who emigrated to Israel in 1954. Mia has two brothers, Ilay and Eli, and a 10-year-old sister. Her mother, Keren Scharf Schem, has been actively involved in advocacy efforts for Mia and other hostages.

== Abduction ==
On 7 October 2023, Hamas militants attacked the Nova music festival near Re'im, Israel as part of the Hamas attack on Israel. During the ensuing Re'im music festival massacre, 364 civilians were killed and forty were taken hostage into the Gaza Strip. Schem attended the festival with her friend, 28-year-old French-Israeli Elia Toledano. During the attack at 7:17 am, Schem messaged a friend saying, "They are shooting at us please come save us."

Schem recounted that she was abducted by militants after she left her friend's burning vehicle during the attack. Schem was shot in the arm at point blank by a Hamas terrorist, and she and Toledano were both abducted and taken hostage into Gaza. Toledano's body was later discovered by the Israel Defense Forces during an operation in December. A militant reportedly began to touch her upper body inappropriately and only stopped after she screamed and the militant noticed that she had been wounded. Someone else dragged her into a car and drove her into Gaza.

== Captivity and treatment ==
Immediately before being transported back to Israel, Schem was coerced by Hamas to give a recorded statement in English claiming she was treated with care and hospitality. Schem has been stating that everyone had been very kind and the food was very good during her time as a hostage. She later stated in an interview that she was forced by Hamas to say this into the camera.

Schem was reportedly initially held by a Gazan family with young kids who would open the door to the room where she was being held just to stare at her. During her captivity, Schem was held in a room with her captor while his wife and children were in an adjacent room. Reportedly, the man's wife would bring him food, without bringing any for Schem, and some days she would not be allowed to eat at all. At one point, Schem's captor reportedly forced her to watch her mother speaking at a news conference calling for Schem's release. She reported being taunted and emotionally abused by her captors, who would say that she would be like Gilad Shalit.

After three days of captivity, Schem was dressed in a hijab and forced to undergo surgery for her gunshot wound. For days afterward, she reportedly received no painkillers and had to replace her own bandages. The day after the surgery, she was forced to film a video which was released by Hamas. Hamas released the video of Schem on 16 October, and was the first person to appear in a Hamas hostage video. In the video, Schem says she was injured and pleads to be returned to her family. She appeared pale and had a long, fresh scar clearly visible and an injured arm.

Schem was reportedly moved between Gazan homes via ambulance. Several days before her release, Schem reported she was taken into Hamas tunnels 200 feet underground where she encountered other Israeli hostages for the first time during her captivity.

== Efforts to release ==
Shortly after the release of the video showing Schem in October 2023, Schem's mother Keren reached out to world leaders with a focus on French President Emmanuel Macron to secure the release of Schem, calling her and other hostages abductions a crime against humanity. The French government condemned the video and led Schem's mother Keren to hold a press conference in Tel Aviv calling for her immediate release.

== Release and aftermath ==
Schem was one of eight hostages freed after 54 days in captivity on 30 November as part of 105 hostages released during a temporary ceasefire between Israel and Hamas. She and Amit Soussana were handed over to the International Red Cross, and were accompanied by IDF and security service agents into Israel. French President Emmanuel Macron described her release as a "great joy". The Hostages and Missing Persons Families Forum praised her "fighting spirit".

Several weeks later, Schem sat for a pair of televised interviews with Channel 12 and Channel 13 that aired on 29 December. Schem's account of her time in captivity mirrored the poor treatment recounted by other hostages and touched a particular nerve in Israel. Schem recounted that she had "experienced Hell. Everyone there are terrorists... there are no innocent civilians, not one." Also in December 2023, Schem planned and received a tattoo commemorating her experiences and memorializing those that were lost with the phrase "we will dance again" and date of 7 October 2023.

According to her family, the trauma and lack of sleep during captivity caused her to experience epilepsy after her release. Schem was a guest at Elton John's 96th Academy Awards viewing party in March 2024. At the party she wore a rhinestone pin expressing solidarity with the hostages still held and was photographed with Sarah Idan, the former Miss Iraq 2016, who wore a dress which named the remaining female hostages.

In May 2025 Schem publicly came out as the person who filed a complaint in March against a well-known fitness instructor whom she alleged had drugged and raped her in her apartment. In an interview, she described how she feared of being sexually assaulted while being held hostage, so it was even more traumatic for her to have been sexually assaulted in her own home, which should have been her "safest place".

== See also ==
- 2023 Gaza war ceasefire
- 2023 Israeli–Palestinian prisoner exchange
- List of kidnappings
- List of Gaza war hostages
