= Nova (film) =

2023 Israeli documentary film

- Directed by: Dan Pe'er
- Edited by: Nadav Direktor; Lev Goltser
- Release date: December 6, 2023 (Israel)
- Running time: 52 mins
- Country: Israel
- Languages: Hebrew; English

#Nova is a 2023 documentary film written and directed by Dan Pe'er. It focuses on the Nova music festival massacre and abductions to the Gaza Strip during the Hamas-led attack on Israel, on 7 October 2023. It is a Yes Studios production.

It premiered on Yes Docu on 6 December 2023 and was released internationally on Prime Video in April 2025.

== Background ==
On 7 October 2023, the Izz al-Din al-Qassam Brigades, the military wing of the Palestinian nationalist political organization Hamas, initiated a sudden attack on Israel from the Gaza Strip. As part of the attack, 364 individuals, mostly civilians, were murdered and many more wounded at the Supernova Sukkot Gathering, an open-air music festival during the Jewish holiday of Shemini Atzeret near kibbutz Re'im. Hamas also took 40 people hostage, and men and women were reportedly subjected to sexual and gender-based violence.

== Synopsis ==
The documentary chronicles the October 7 attacks on the Supernova music festival near the Gaza border.

It relies on raw, real‑time footage collected from festival goers in the immediate aftermath of the attack. Pe'er, who was involved in volunteer efforts to assist survivors, compiled video and audio materials into a chronological narrative before developing the project with Yes TV. The film avoids commentary or retrospective interviews, instead focusing on the visceral emotions and chaos experienced by participants.

== Production ==
Director Dan Pe'er conceived Nova in the immediate aftermath of the October 7, 2023 Hamas attack on the Supernova music festival. While volunteering to assist survivors and families of missing persons, Pe'er began collecting video and audio clips shared on social media and by attendees. He initially used these materials to create identification profiles for missing individuals, but soon realised their potential to form a chronological account of the massacre.

Pe'er assembled a team of volunteers and established a makeshift "war room" to gather and catalogue thousands of recordings, including footage captured by festival goers and by Hamas militants themselves. The director later partnered with Kastina Communications to formalise the project, producing the documentary for Yes Docu, the documentary arm of the Israeli satellite broadcaster Yes Studios.

The film was completed in less than two months, reflecting both the urgency of the subject matter and Pe'er's determination to preserve the raw immediacy of the events.

== Release ==
The film premiered on Yes Docu in Israel on 6 December 2023, less than two months after the October 7 attacks. #Nova was released internationally on Prime Video in April 2025.

=== Netflix controversy ===
The film was reportedly rejected by Netflix's commissioning team for being "too political". Thirteen British parliamentarians who attended a screening of the film wrote to the streamer protesting the decision and demanding answers. The letter, circulated in April 2024, was co-coordinated by Tom Hunt from the Conservative Party. The other signatories included Michael Ellis, Eric Pickles, Miriam Cates and Ros Altmann, Baroness Altmann.

The letter states: "I am seeking to understand Netflix's decision to reject [the film]. The documentary about an attack on young people enjoying themselves at a music festival is something that viewers across the world, from all backgrounds, would be able to relate to. I strongly believe that this film is crucial viewing. This is why I was deeply troubled when I heard that Netflix, one of the world's premier streaming services, rejected it. Netflix reportedly stated that their justification was because the film in question was too political."
