= The Car Wall =

Memorial in Israel

Coordinates: 31.448213°N 34.569536°E

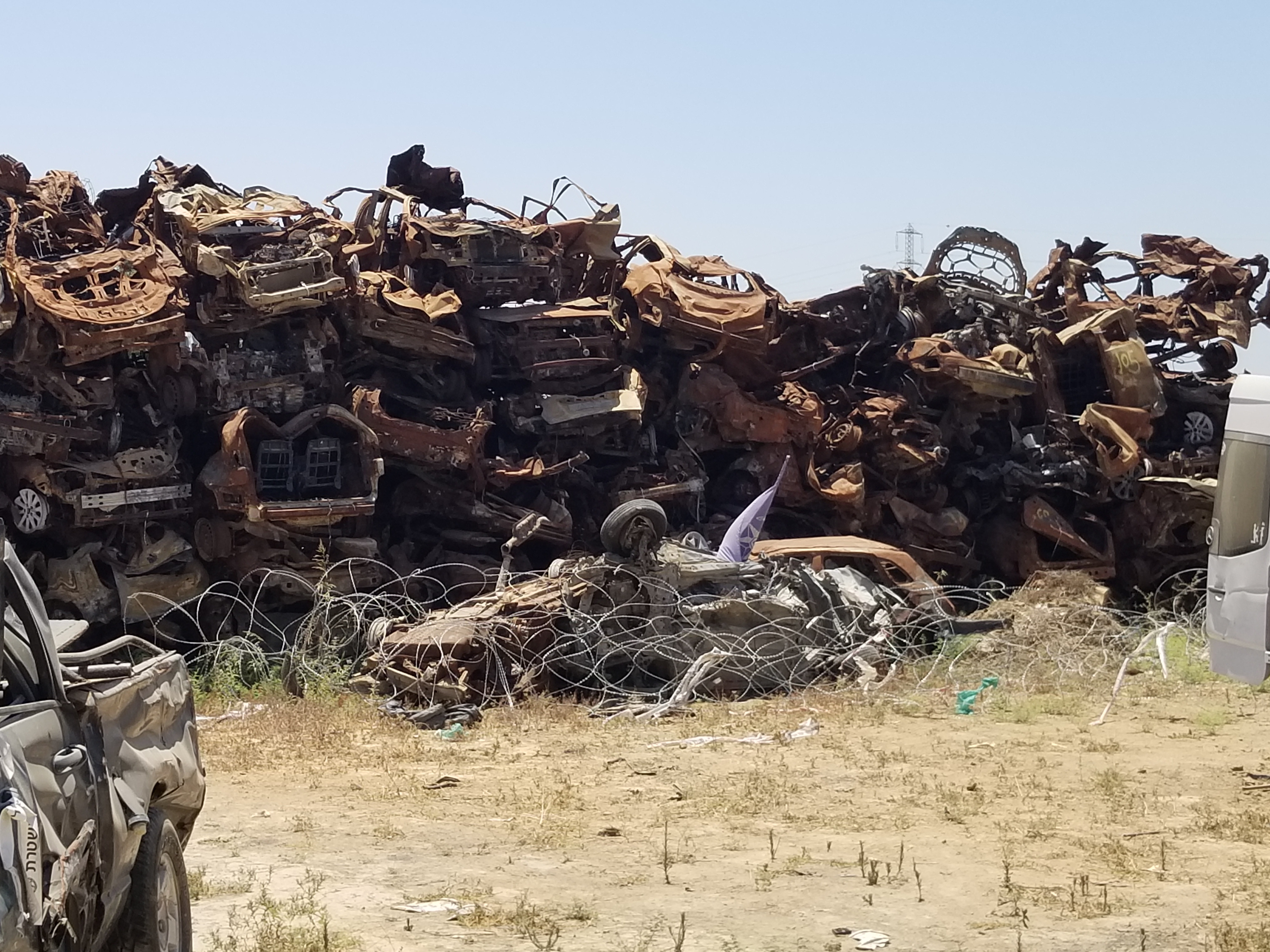
Wall of cars in the burnt vehicle lot memorial

The Car Wall (Hebrew: קיר המכוניות) is a pile of burnt cars west of Tkuma in the Gaza envelope, resembling the shape of a wall. Originally, this pile was created by evacuating the burnt cars from Route 232 and other places in the Gaza envelope after the Hamas attack on 7 October 2023, in general, and the massacre at the Nova Festival in particular, from where most of the cars came. Later, the wall of burnt cars became a memorial to the massacre that took place at the festival, which was the largest terrorist attack in the history of the State of Israel.

Next to the wall of burnt cars, there are hundreds of other cars that are no longer usable due to the attack, and they too are displayed as a memorial to the massacres committed against their owners.

== Background ==
On the morning of October 7, 2023, the Hamas organizations and the Palestinian Islamic Jihad launched a surprise attack on Israel. Under the cover of launching thousands of rockets, about 3,500 militant from the Gaza Strip infiltrated dozens of Israeli settlements and military facilities in the Gaza envelope area and its surroundings, conducting shooting battles against a few security forces. The militant committed acts of physical and sexual violence and killed 1,150 people, including 779 civilians, and abducted about 253 people to the Gaza Strip, including women, the elderly, and infants. In the first hours, they fought against kibbutz readiness squads, Israeli police officers, Yamam fighters, and Israel Defense Forces (IDF) soldiers. In the battles, about 1,550 militants were killed on Israeli territory, and on the Israeli side, 301 soldiers, 55 police officers, and 10 General Security Service personnel were killed.

== The Memorial ==
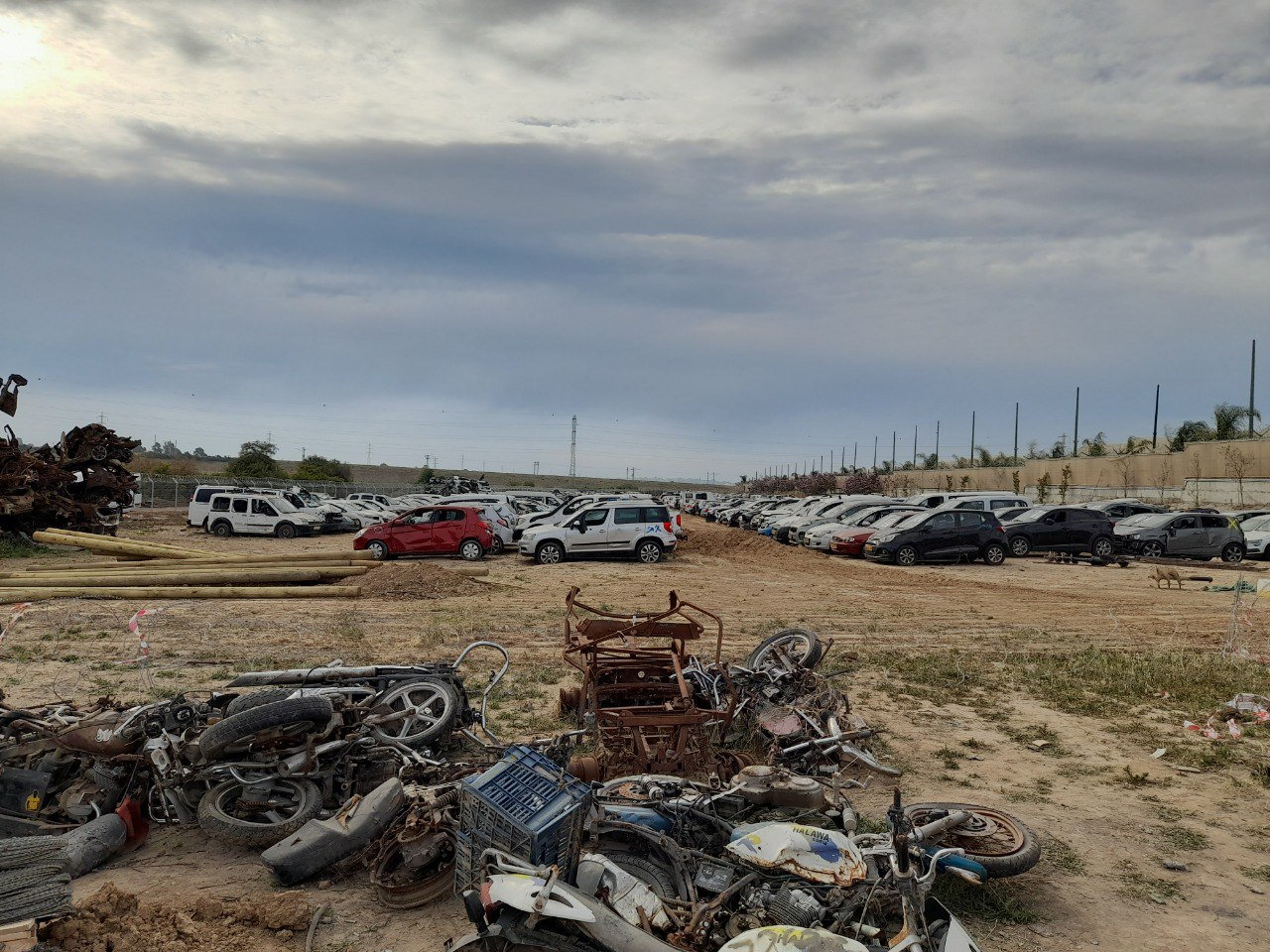
The memorial of the cars in Tkuma

A total of 1,600 damaged vehicles were transferred to a car lot located west of the Tkuma settlement and northwest of Netivot. In the days following the Nova music festival massacre, 860 burnt and damaged vehicles scattered along the sides of Route 232—most of them from the Nova festival—were transported from the Gaza envelope to the Tkuma lot, and another one 500 metres (1,600 ft) north of the entrance to the Re'im kibbutz.

These were moved there in order to clear the road and to concentrate the cars of the victims in order to facilitate the process of locating and identifying the remains of the bodies. At least one of the cars—a Hyundai light utility vehicle—originated in the Gaza Strip. Out of all the vehicles that arrived at the lot, 400 received approval from the examiners to return to the road, while the rest were written off, some due to the fact that the militants shot at the engines of the vehicles in order to disable them, and then shot the occupants to death. 280 vehicles were burnt beyond recognition. Some were riddled with bullet holes, while others were hit by anti-tank rounds or crushed beyond recognition by tank tracks.

Next to the cars, there is also a pile of motorcycles on which the militants rode.

In November 2023, investigators arrived at the lot with the aim of finding items from the victims inside the burnt vehicles. Members of ZAKA also arrived at the location in order to find items that could lead to a proper burial in Israel.

== Allegations of looting ==
In the aftermath of the attack, the Gaza envelope was declared a military exclusion zone by the IDF. Access to the junkyards was controlled by Israeli police and property tax officials. In the days following the attack, many family members of those who were killed wished to retrieve their loved ones personal belongings from the cars, especially cameras that apparently had photographic evidence documenting their last moments. Many of these family members were unsuccessful due to having been directed by police and property tax officials to the wrong junkyard. The families then appealed to the IDF, which notified them that many of the cars were already emptied of valuables by gangs of looters while they sat unguarded near the open fields of Re'im.

A joint IDF Home Front Command and Yahalom search on 27 October 2023 turned up many loose documents, keys, eyewear, toiletries, cool boxes full of food, clothing, books, dolls, child seats, tents, sleeping bags, cannabis joints and hundreds of empty backpacks. Two days before, police arrested two people on suspicion of looting a car where "almost nothing was left". Any mobile phones or wallets found were placed in numbered black bags and ordered to be delivered to the office of Gal Hirsch—the hostage affairs liaison to the Prime Minister's Office—which was to transfer them to the "special intelligence units", but this did not happen. A representative from Hirsch's office told a Haaretz reporter that "no one approached the vehicles except us ... we did it systematically". When asked about the looting, he said "I'm not a military guy. I put out an alert that they're looting equipment there". In the end the bags were transferred to Israel's national police agency Lahav 433, which delivered them to the families.

== Gallery ==
Burnt vehicle lot memorial
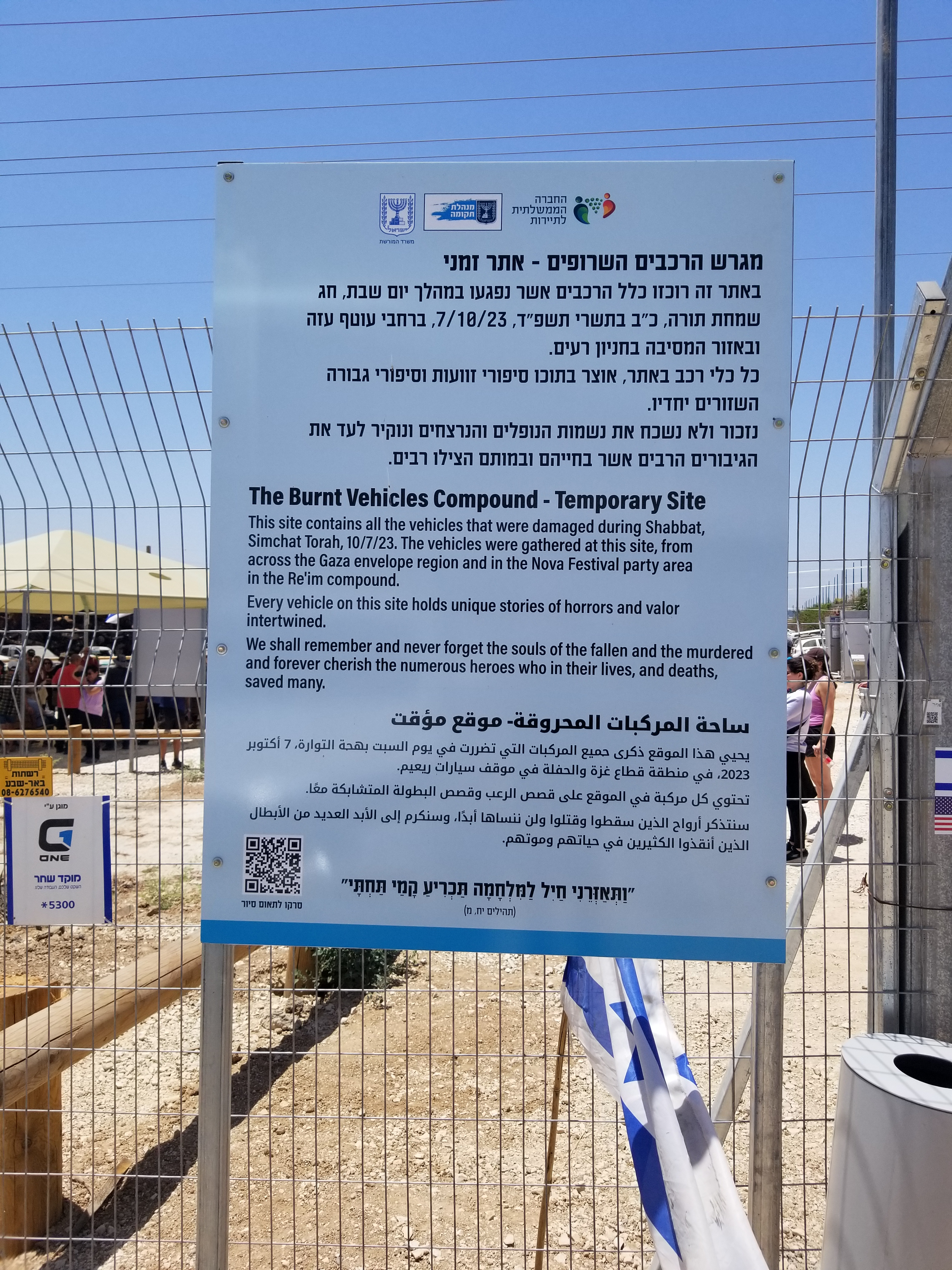
Entrance sign to Temporary burnt vehicle lot memorial

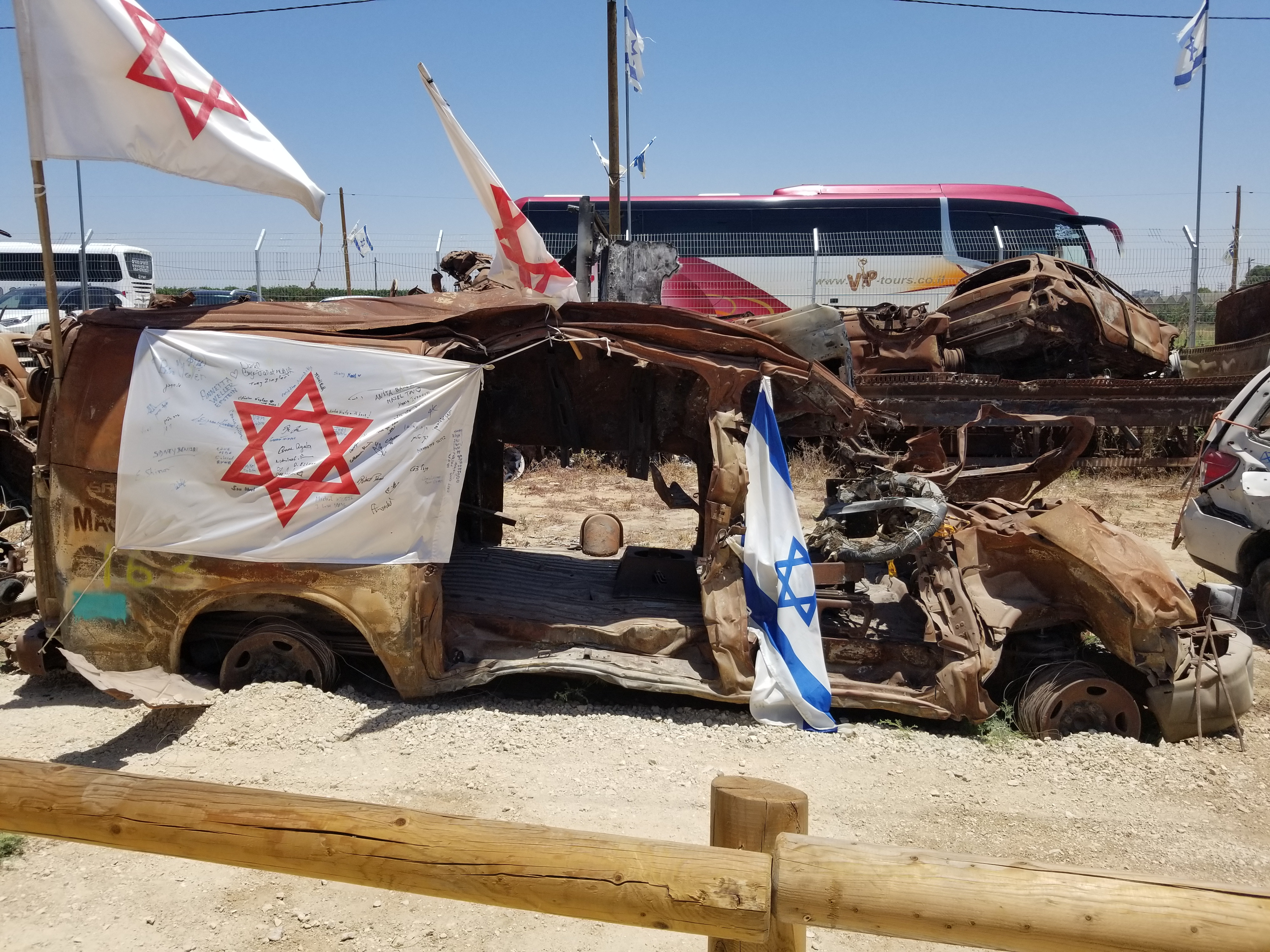
Burnt Israeli ambulance

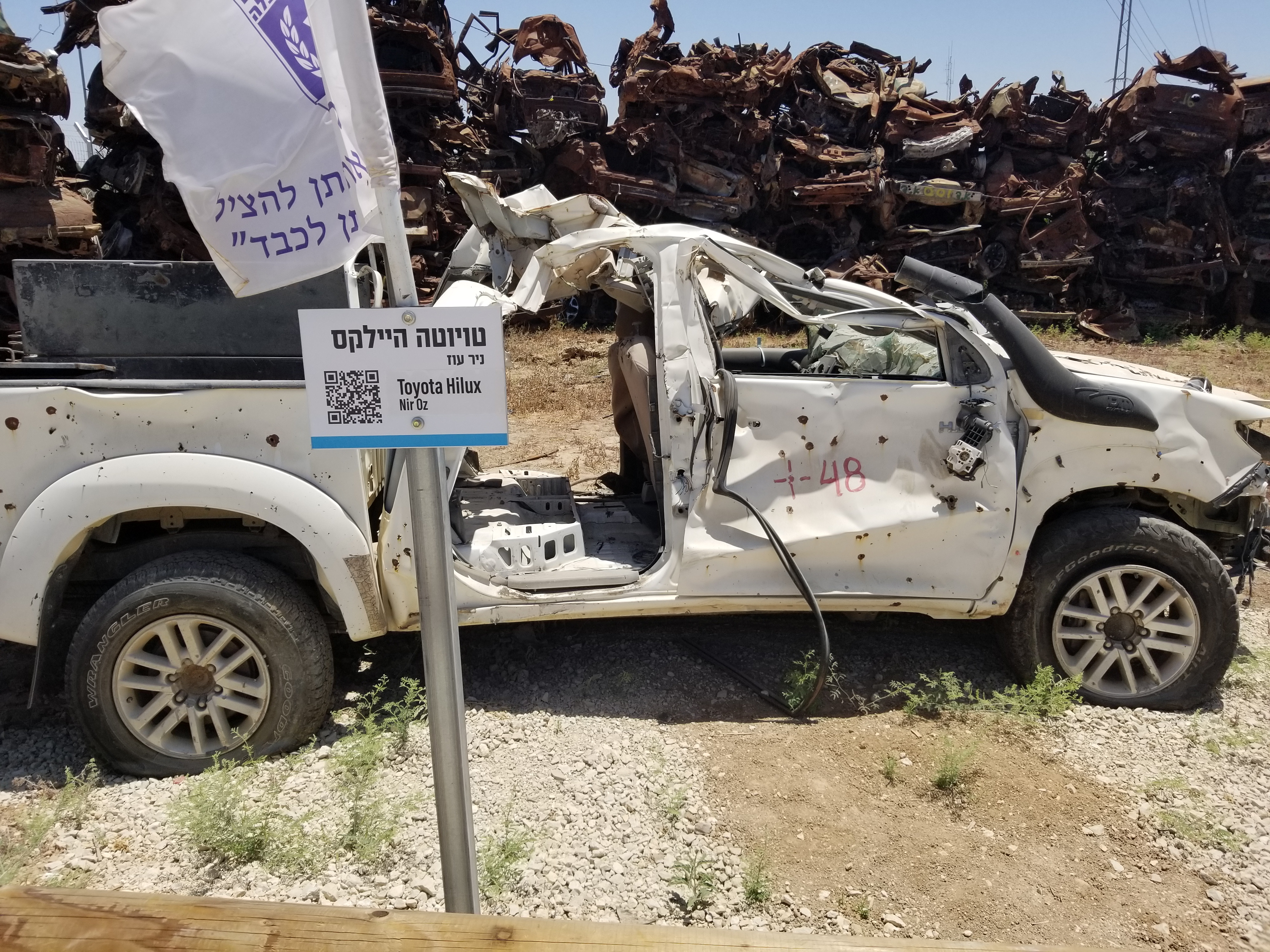
Israeli bullet riddled car

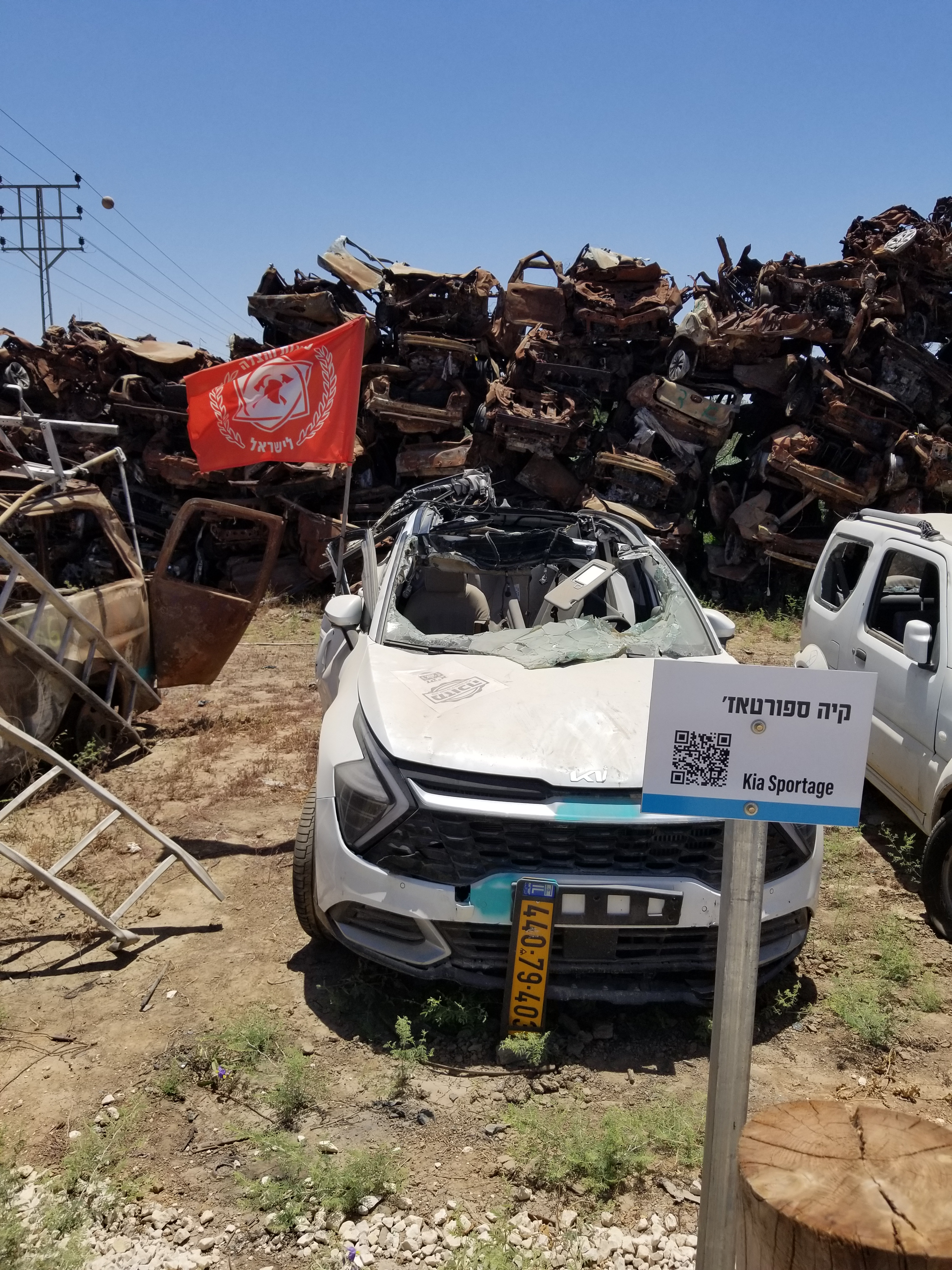
Destroyed car from Israel Fire and Rescue Services

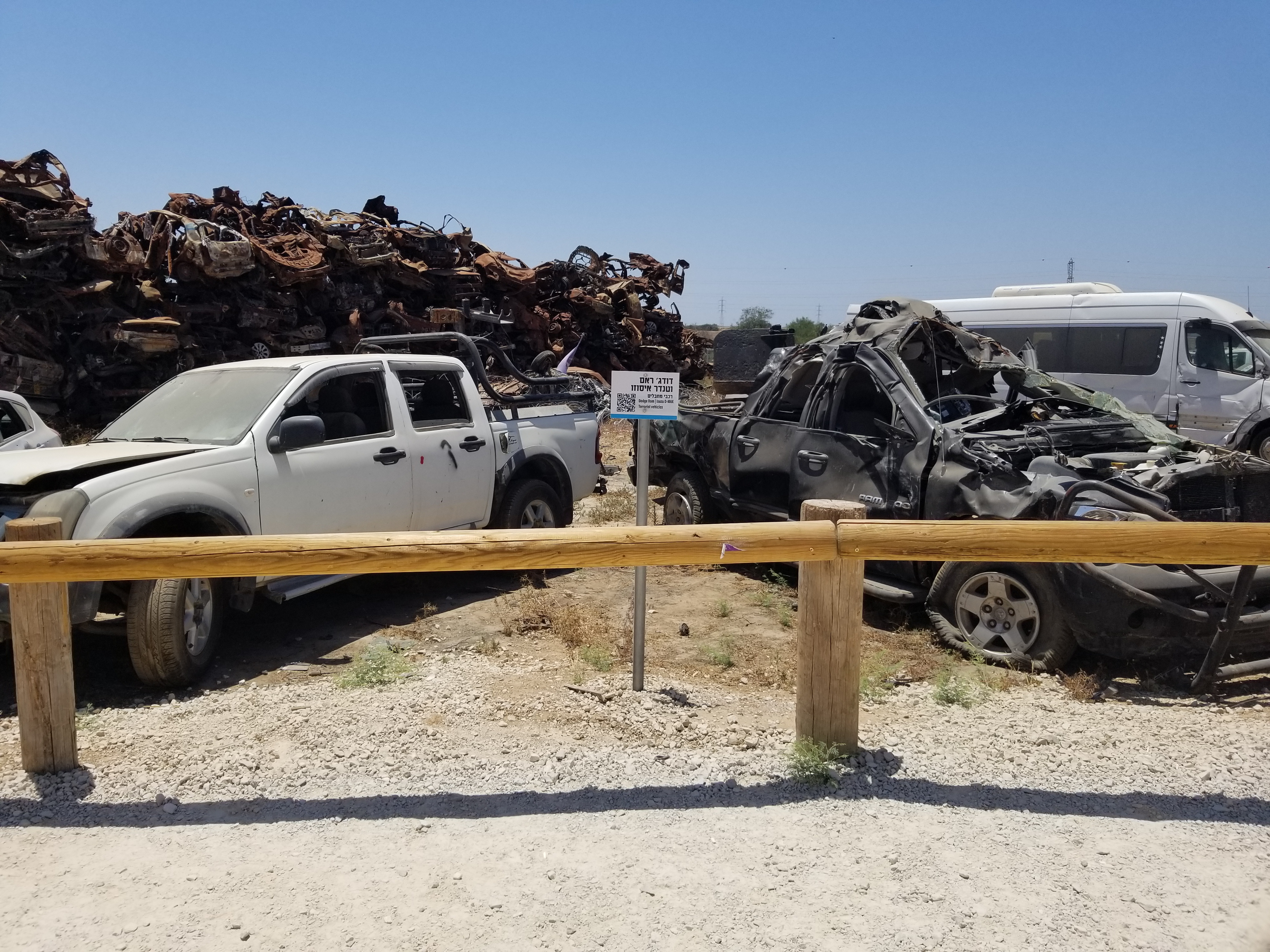
Damaged vehicles used in October 7th attack
