= Danna Stern =

Israeli television executive and producer

- Danna Stern at the Tribeca Film Festival 2026
- Education: Tel Aviv University; Kellogg School of Management
- Occupations: Television executive, producer
- Known for: Former head of Yes Studios
- Notable work: Fauda; Bros; Supernova: The Music Festival Massacre
- Spouse: Dov Gil-har
- Children: 3

Danna Stern is a film producer. She runs In Transit Productions and is the former head of yes Studios.

== Career ==
Stern studied at Tel Aviv University and the Kellogg School of Management. Stern worked as a news producer for Israeli Army Radio and then spent six year with Reuters Television in Jerusalem. In 1999 she joined yes TV as an acquisitions executive working her way up to vice president and in 2017 became managing director of yes Studios. During her tenure, Fauda was the first show in Hebrew to get picked up by Netflix. Stern is a member of the International Academy of Television Arts and Sciences.

In 2023, Stern was selected to be on the international jury of the inaugural Berlinale Series Award at 73rd Berlin International Film Festival.

In 2024, Stern was selected to be on the international jury of NEM Zagreb 2024.

Stern is producing Bros, a Netflix Hebrew-language TV series from Guy Amir and Hanan Savyon.

Along with Reinhardt Beetz and Duki Dror, Stern produced a documentary about the Re'im music festival massacre called Supernova: The Music Festival Massacre.

Stern won Best Documentary at the German Television Awards for Hamas Festival Attack – The Survivors Of The Desert Rave.

== Personal life ==
Stern's husband is Israeli journalist and TV anchor, Dov Gil-har. They have three children. She is based in Berlin.
