= Nova Festival Victims Memorial =

Monument in Kibbutz Re'im, Israel

- אנדרטת נרצחי פסטיבל נובה
- Drone view of the Memorial
- Interactive map of Nova Festival Victims Memorial
- Location: Eshkol Regional Council, Israel
- Coordinates: 31°23′52″N 34°28′18″E
- Dedicated to: The victims of the Nova music festival massacre

The Nova Festival Victims Memorial (Hebrew: אנדרטת נרצחי פסטיבל נובה) is a monument commemorating the victims of the Nova music festival massacre during the October 7 attacks. It is located in the Re'im parking lot near Re'im in the Southern District of Israel, where the festival took place on October 6–7, 2023.

== Background ==
=== Festival ===
On the night between October 6 and 7, 2023, the Supernova Sukkot Gathering it took place in the Gaza envelope, located in the western Negev desert, approximately 5 km (3.1 mi) from the Gaza–Israel barrier, near Re'im.

=== Massacre ===
On the morning of October 7, 2023, at 6:30 a.m., which was around sunrise, rockets launched from the Gaza Strip were noticed in the sky. Around 7:00 a.m., a siren warned of an incoming rocket attack, prompting festivalgoers to flee. Subsequently, armed militants for the Al-Qassam Brigades from Hamas, dressed in military attire and using motorcycles, trucks and powered paragliders, surrounded the festival grounds and indiscriminately fired on individuals attempting to escape. The massacre at the festival was the largest terror attack in Israel's history, and the worst Israeli civilian massacre ever.

== The Memorial ==
Photos of the victims from the party are displayed at the memorial in the Re'im parking lot. At the site where the massacre occurred, a memorial was established in memory of the victims. On Tu BiShvat 5784, the families of the victims planted trees in memory of their loved ones, and the Jewish National Fund (JNF) erected posts displaying photos of the murdered and kidnapped, along with Israeli flags. At the base of these posts, artists from across the country placed red anemone sculptures, symbolizing the flowers that bloom in the nearby Re'im forest during winter and serving as a metaphor for the young lives lost.

Additionally, members of the civilian emergency response team displayed a sign with the message: "Bring Them Home Now," along with a fabric adorned with paintings of 40 colorful butterflies, representing the number of people taken as hostages from the party.

Since the massacre, thousands have visited the site to lay wreaths. School groups, security personnel, delegations from abroad, and others regularly visit the memorial.

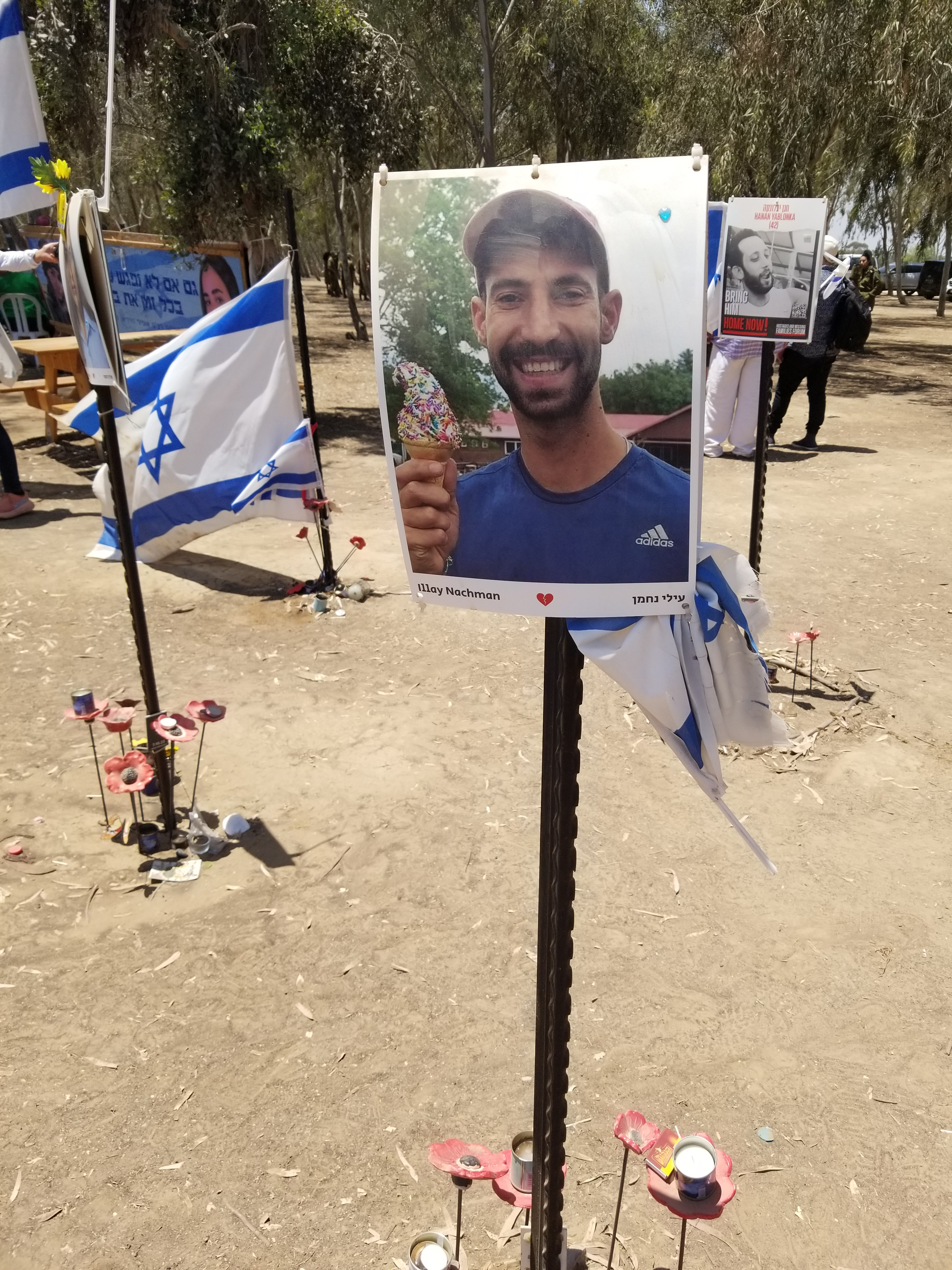
Photo of Ilay Nachman who was murdered

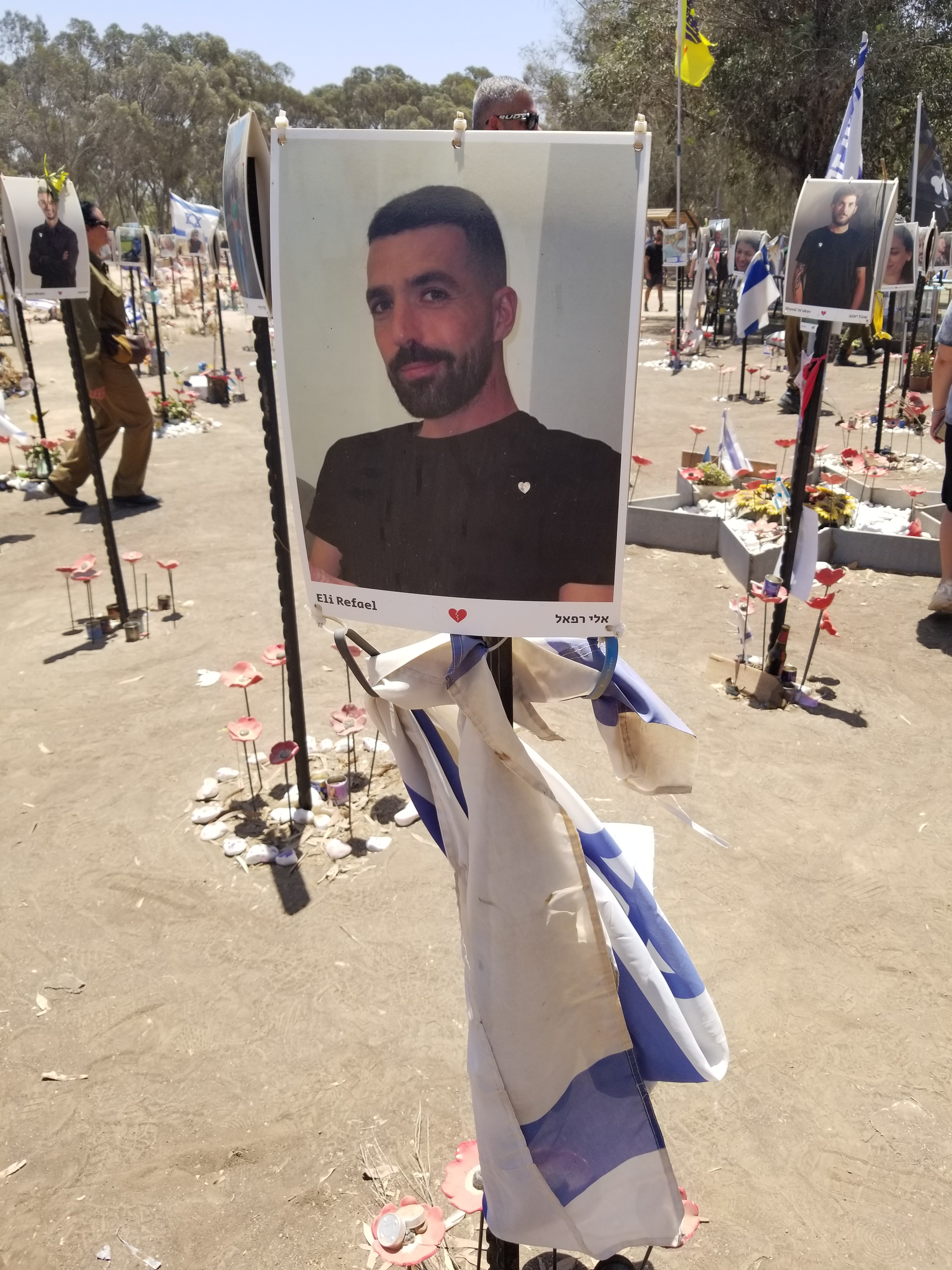
Photo of Eli Refael who was murdered

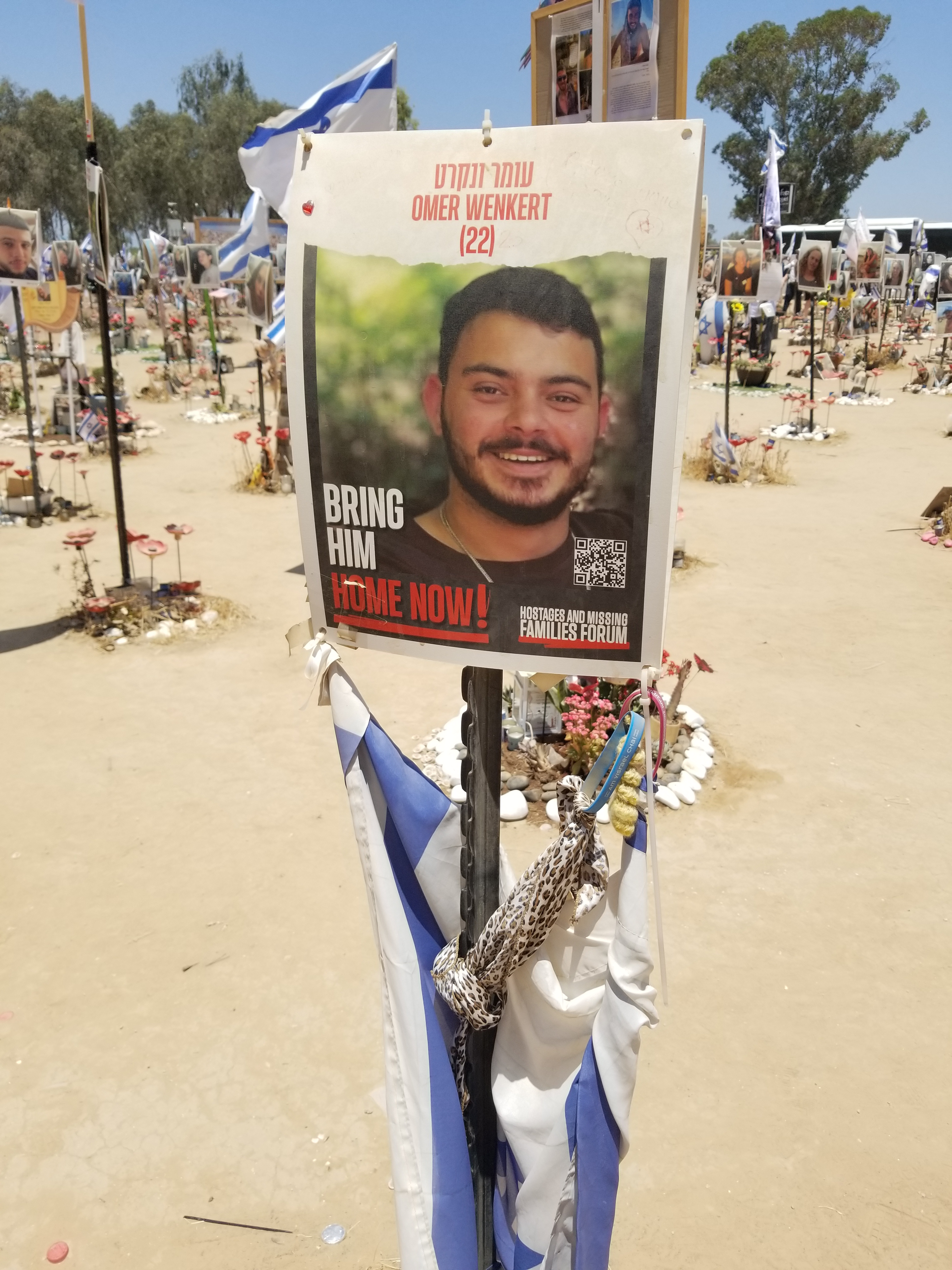
Photo of Omer Wenkert who was taken hostage

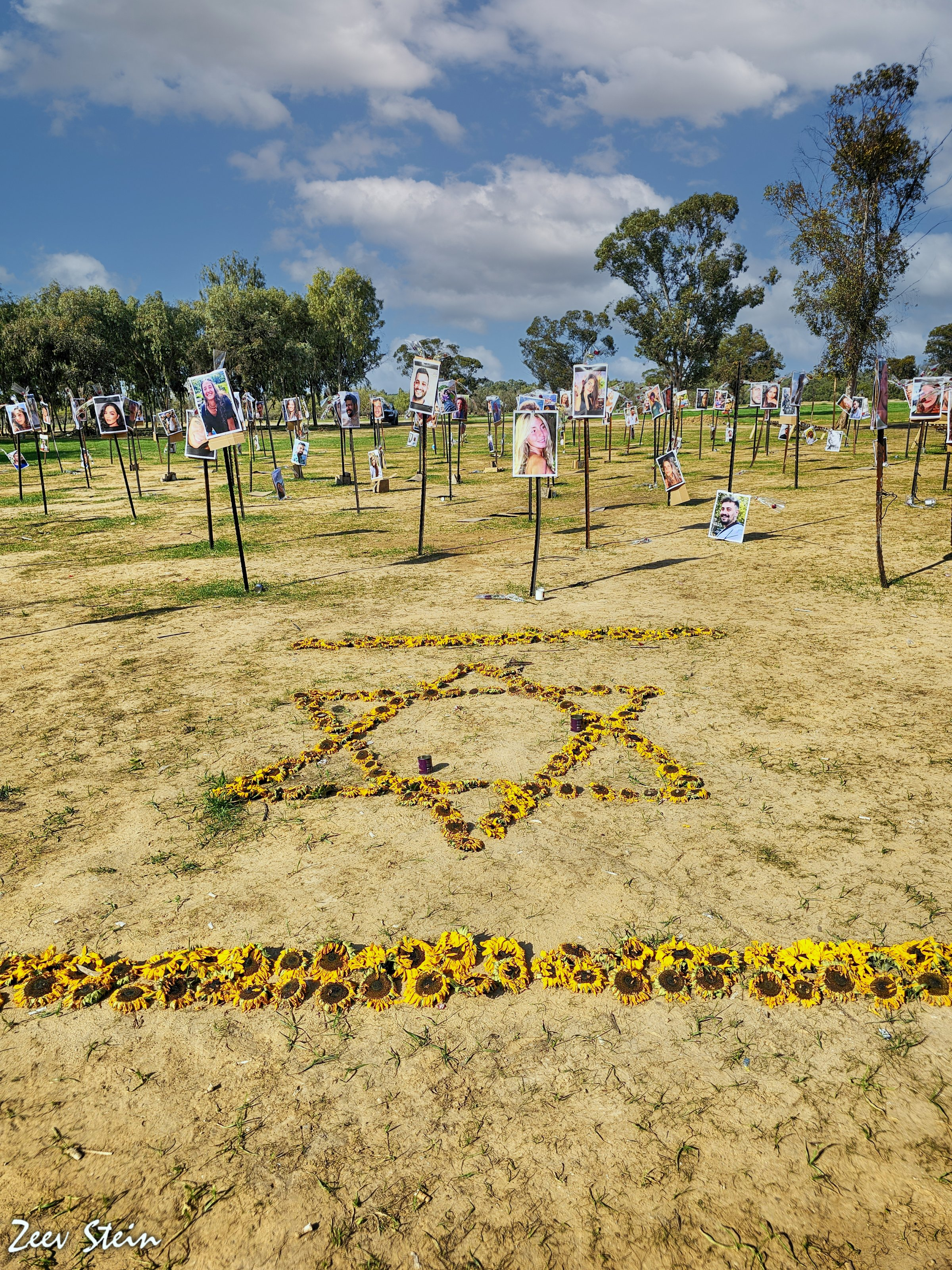
The Memorial in December 2023

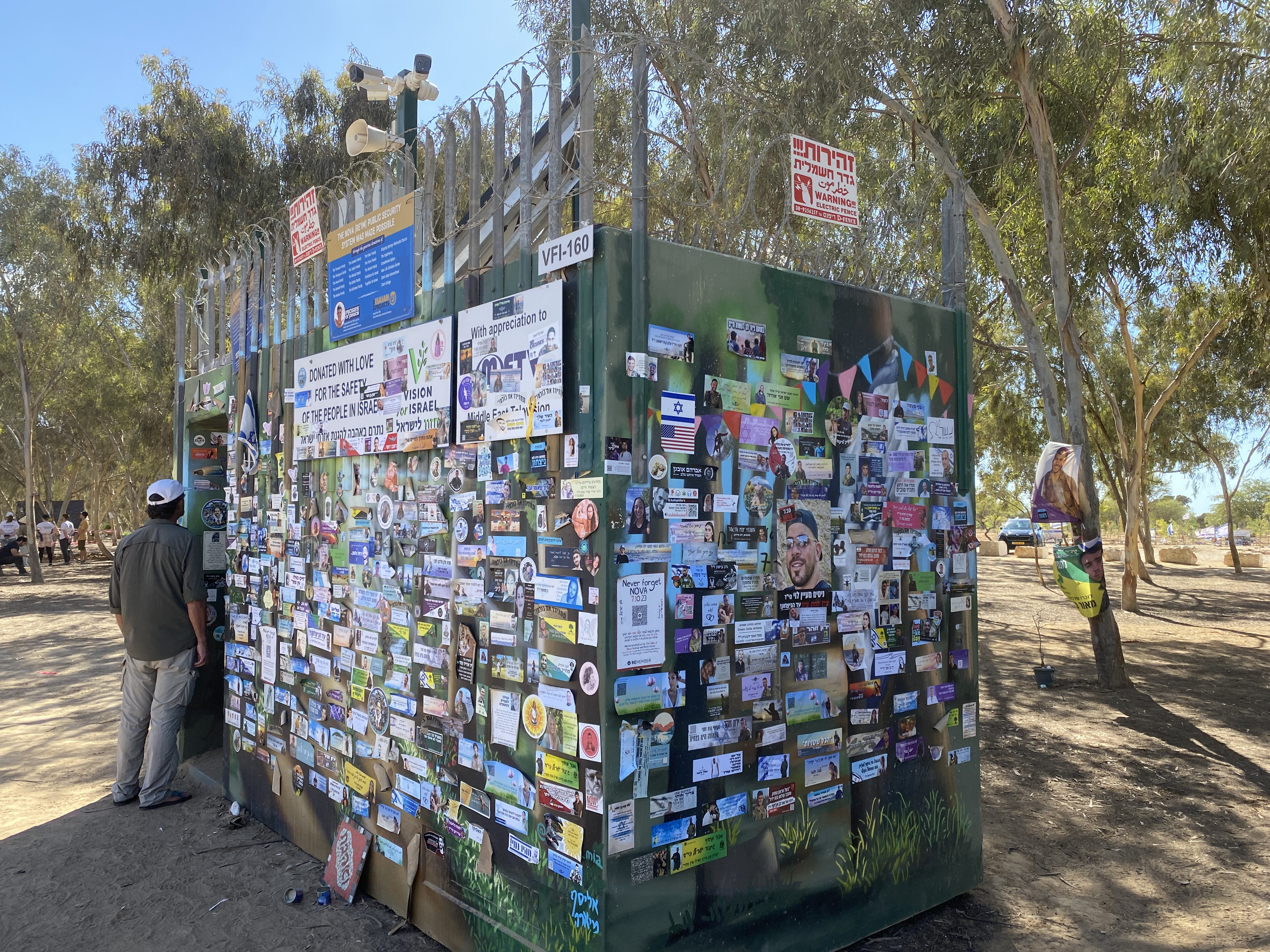
Bomb shelter at the site decorated with memorial posters

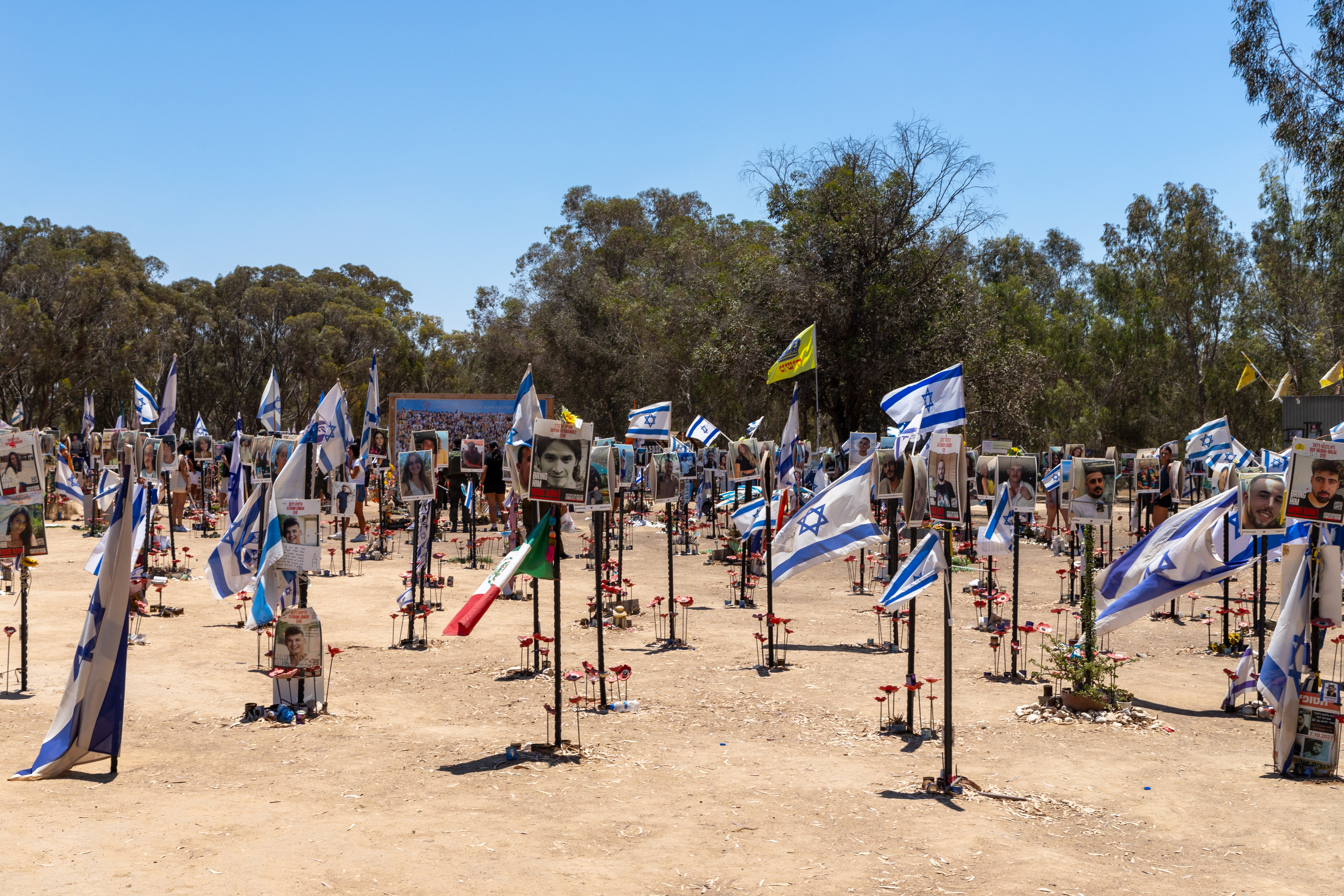
Main Memorial grounds for individuals murdered

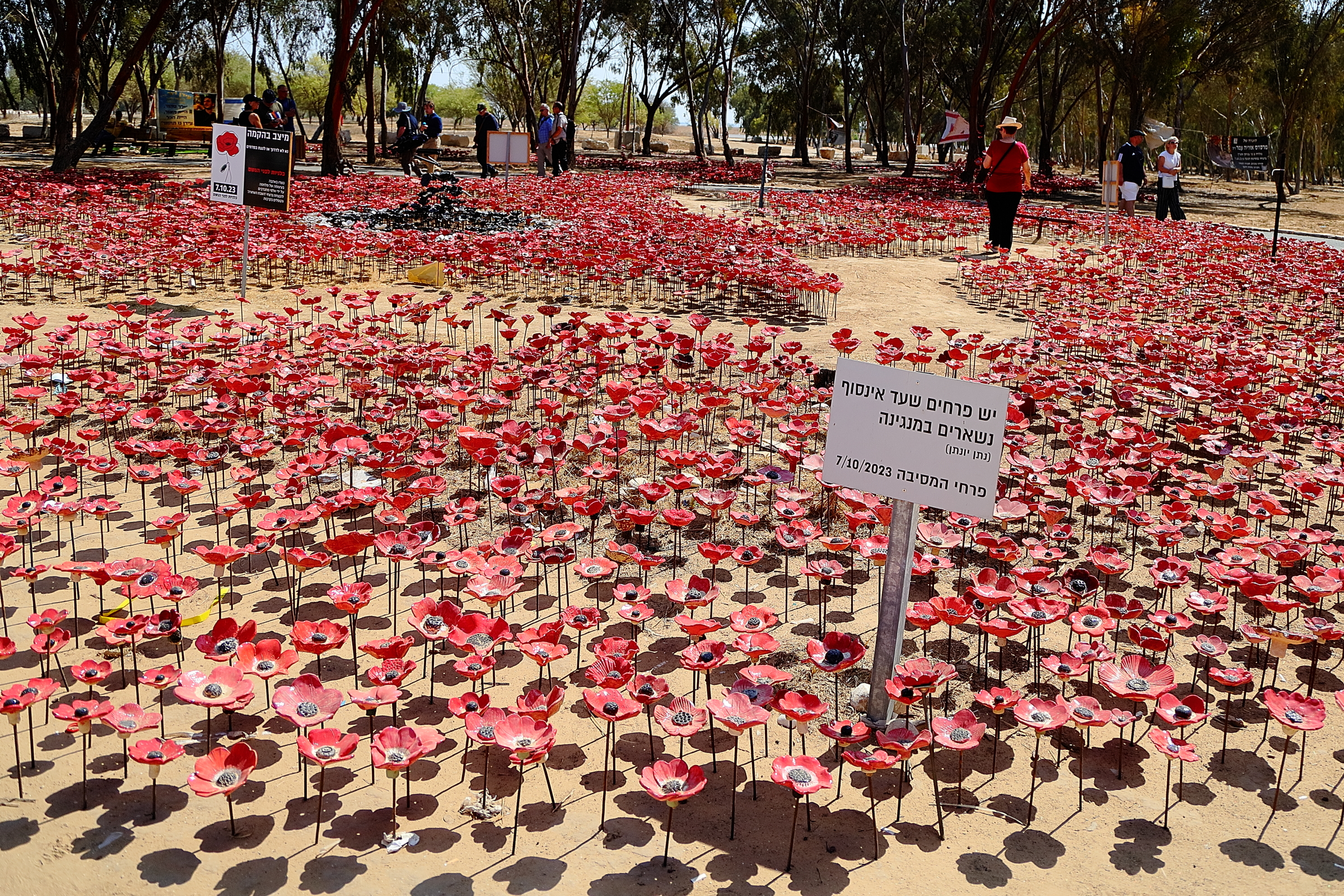
Anemones Before the Rain Memorial

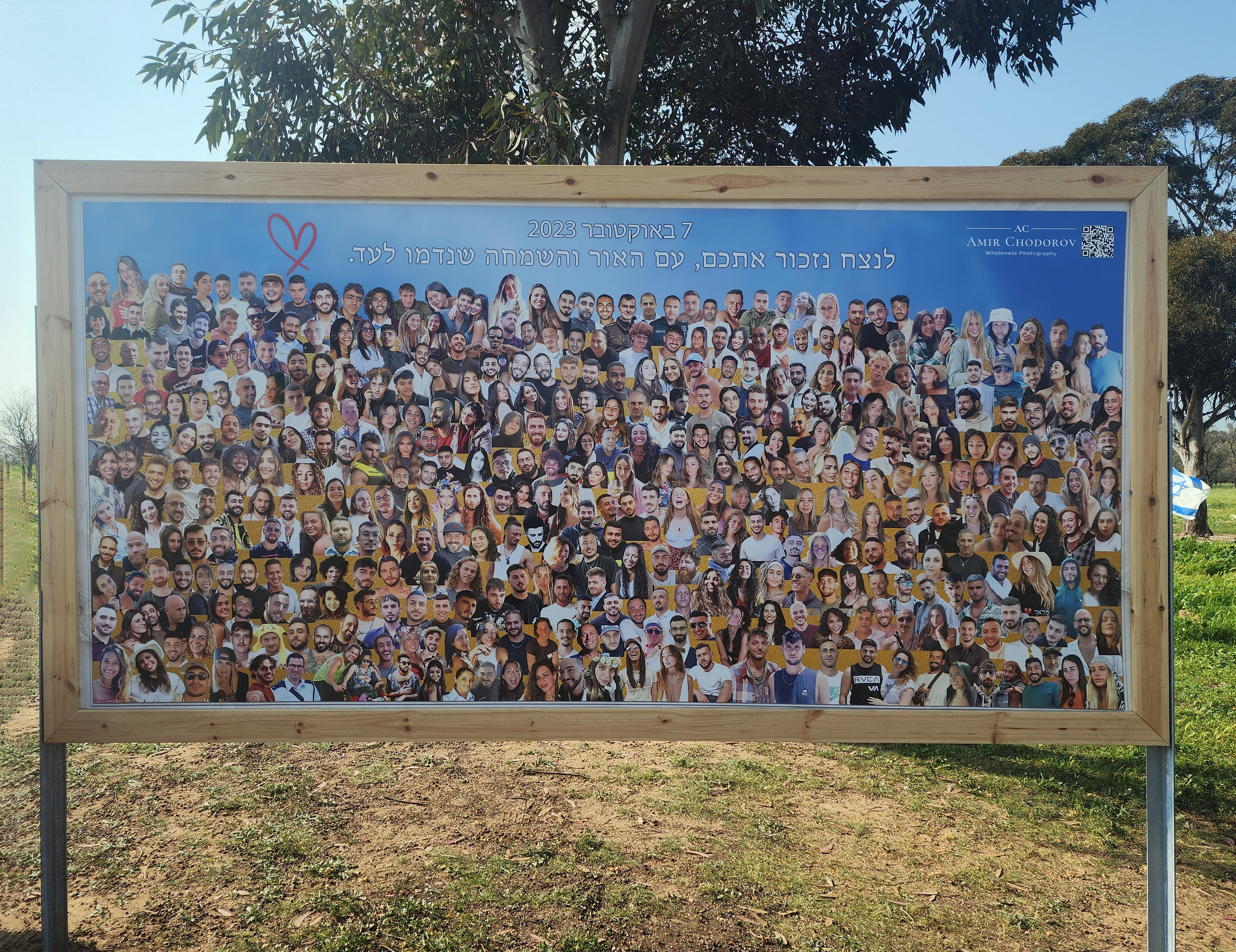
Photos of murdered at the festival in the entrance
