= Nova music festival massacre =

2023 massacre in southern Israel

- Part of the October 7 attacks
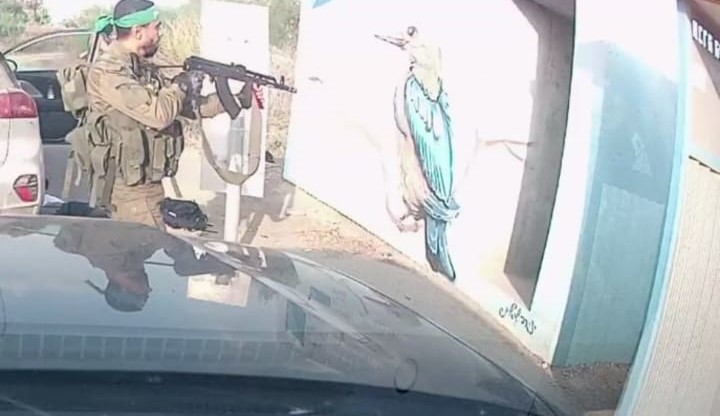
- A Hamas militant fires into a bomb shelter
- Location: 31°23′52″N 34°28′18″E; Eshkol Regional Council, Israel
- Date: 7 October 2023; 3 years ago Starting c. 7 a.m. (IST; UTC+3)
- Target: Israelis
- Attack type: Mass shooting, mass murder, hostage-taking, war crimes
- Weapons: Firearms including AK-type assault rifles, RPGs, hand grenades
- Deaths: 378 Israelis (Note: Excludes those who were also taken as hostage and either killed in captivity, or killed at the scene with and their bodies abducted (see §Hostages taken from the music festival for additional details). Also excludes two survivors who later committed suicide.): 344 civilians; 34 security personnel; ~20 Palestinian perpetrators
- Victims: 44 kidnapped and held hostage: 4 rescued; 21 released; 3 bodies returned; 16 bodies recovered (1 body recovered from a hostage standoff inside Israel)
- Perpetrator: Over 100 operatives of the Al-Qassam Brigades along with Palestinian civilian mobs

On 7 October 2023, the al-Qassam Brigades, the military wing of the Palestinian nationalist and Islamist political organization Hamas, initiated a sudden attack on Israel from the Gaza Strip. As part of the attack, 378 people (344 civilians and 34 security personnel) were killed and many more wounded at the Supernova Sukkot Gathering, an open-air music festival during the Jewish holiday of Shemini Atzeret near kibbutz Re'im. Hamas also took 44 people hostage, and men and women were reportedly subject to sexual and gender-based violence. Some 20 of the attackers were also killed by Israeli security forces in the area of the festival.

This attack had the largest number of casualties out of a number of massacres targeting Israeli civilians in villages adjacent to the Gaza Strip, that occurred as part of the 7 October attack, alongside those at the kibbutzim and moshavim of Netiv HaAsara, Be'eri, Kfar Aza, Nir Oz and Holit.

At 6:30 a.m., which was around sunrise, rockets were noticed in the sky. Around 7:00 a.m., a siren warned of an incoming rocket attack, prompting festivalgoers to flee. Subsequently, armed militants, dressed in military attire and using motorcycles, trucks and powered paragliders, surrounded the festival grounds and indiscriminately fired on individuals attempting to escape. Attendees seeking refuge in nearby locations, such as bomb shelters, bushes, and orchards, were killed while in hiding. Those who reached the road and parking were trapped in a traffic jam as militants fired at vehicles. The militants killed some wounded individuals at point-blank range as they crouched on the ground.

On 13 October 2025, the last living hostage was released, and two days later the body of the last hostage was returned. The massacre at the festival was the largest terror attack in Israel's history, and the deadliest concert attack in history.

== Gathering and festivities ==
Supernova Sukkot Gathering was a weekend-long outdoor trance music festival that began on 6 October 2023 and was produced by an organizer called Nova, also referred to as Tribe of Nova. It was the Israeli edition, pre-festival event of Universo Paralello, a psychedelic trance festival started 23 years earlier in Bahia, Brazil. It took place in the western Negev desert, approximately 5 km (3.1 mi) from the Gaza–Israel barrier, near kibbutz Re'im. The line-up included artists well known in the psychedelic trance scene, such as Astral Projection and Man with No Name.

The organizers switched to the site only two days before, after the original location in southern Israel did not work out. Scheduled to coincide with Jewish holidays: the final day of Sukkot (6 October) and Simchat Torah (7 October), the rave was billed as a celebration of "friends, love and infinite freedom". The festival site had three stages, a camping zone, and an area with a bar and food. Attendees described the crowd as mostly consisting of Israelis of ages 20–40 from across the country. Attendance was reported to be 3,500 but figures vary. (Note: Attendance was estimated as high as 4,000.) Security guards and police were present at the festival.

== Hamas assault ==
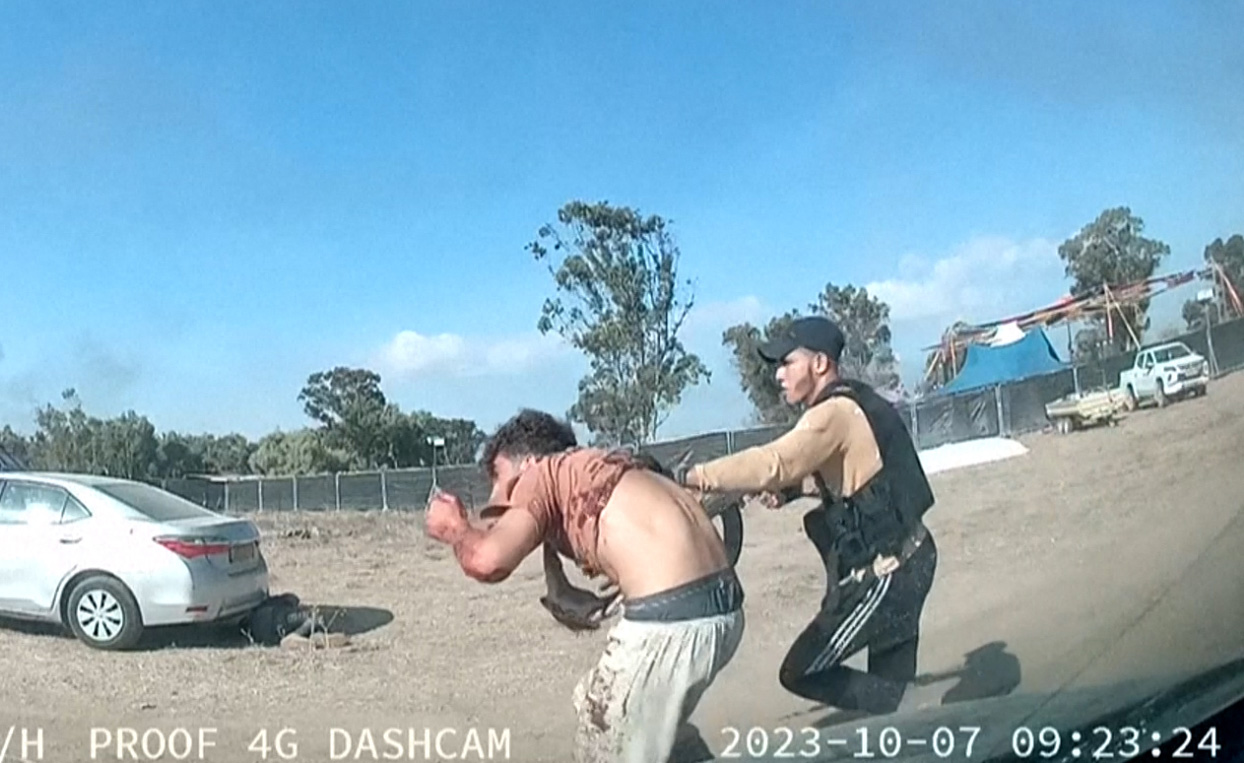
A Hamas militant snatching a festivalgoer during the massacre

The festival was one of the first targets of Hamas's surprise attack against Israel in the early morning hours of 7 October 2023. Israeli security services investigations have found it unlikely that Hamas had advance knowledge of the festival, citing, among other evidence, that the festival had been planned to run until 6 October and was only recently extended to 7 October. The massacre was carried out by the 1st and 3rd companies of Hamas's Nuseirat Battalion. Their original target was the city of Netivot, but after noticing the party they turned back and headed in its direction, where they committed the massacre. Afterwards, they again headed towards Netivot. After seeing an Israeli tank, they turned back again and joined the Nuseirat Battalion's 2nd company at kibbutz Be'eri in perpetrating the Be'eri massacre.

The attack opened with a rocket barrage starting at about 6:30 a.m. that provided cover for infiltration. A rocket siren sounded in the area. Militants blasted through the border fence in numerous locations and began infiltrating into Israel. Some of the Hamas gunmen who attacked the festival infiltrated Israel via motorized paragliders.

At 6:35 a.m., the senior police commander on duty at the festival, Deputy Superintendent Nivi Ohana of the Ofakim police station, taking note of the unusually heavy rocket fire, decided to shut down the event and evacuate the partygoers. This decision is credited with saving hundreds of lives. Ohana also requested additional security and backup subsequently arrived, including a team from the Yasam riot control unit. Ohana and members of the production team called on the partygoers to disperse through loudspeakers.

By 7:00 a.m., Ohana had left to defend his city, which was also under attack. Partygoers began fleeing as the police directed them to evacuate along Route 232. At 7:13 a.m., the Home Front Command officer at the Northern Brigade of the Gaza Division received an inaccurate update that some 90% of the partygoers had evacuated and that there were reports of gunfire, and passed it on. At this stage, the division wrongly understood that the party had largely dispersed.

Police directing traffic out of the area noticed that many partygoers were returning after coming under fire. Those who fled north were fired at near Alumim, Be'eri, and Sa'ad, and those who then tried to flee south came under fire from militants who had captured junctions along the highway. After realizing what was happening along the evacuation routes, police opened a dirt path leading east, enabling thousands of people to escape through agricultural fields toward Patish, with people fleeing both by car and foot. Dozens of vehicles were abandoned by fleeing partygoers along Route 232 and on the festival grounds. Meanwhile, Hamas fighters murdered partygoers along the highway and at several roadside bomb shelters. Public roadside bomb shelters which were used as cover and subsequently became death traps as militants attacked them became known as the Death Shelters. Aner Shapira was credited with helping to protect the shelter he was in. After militants threw grenades into his shelter, he threw several back at them before being killed by a grenade. Hersh Goldberg-Polin was abducted from the same shelter after being seriously wounded.

By 8:00 a.m., about 90% of the partygoers had evacuated the festival grounds. The only people remaining behind were police officers, event staff, and some partygoers who thought the grounds were safer than the roads. At the same time, a force of 110 Hamas fighters on 14 pickup trucks and two motorcycles entered Israel from Nuseirat, heading for Netivot. The force passed Be'eri, where a militant outside the kibbutz signaled to the force to continue along Route 232. However, the force got lost near Shokeda and instead of heading north and then east to Netivot, the militants headed south toward the Nova festival grounds. On the way, they stopped at a bomb shelter near Be'eri and murdered several people sheltering there, including partygoers who fled the festival.

At 8:12 a.m., the militants spotted a police roadblock near the festival and an exchange of fire began as the police officers, armed only with pistols, engaged. At 8:14 a.m., a RPG was fired at the roadblock, striking an abandoned vehicle and wounding several police officers and partygoers in the vicinity. Dozens of partygoers who had assembled near the police officers along the highway began to flee either back into the festival grounds or east through the fields. Those who fled into the festival grounds began looking for places to hide, taking cover in bushes, portable toilets, and dumpsters. Members of the staff also hid underneath the drink bars. An ambulance that had been in the area for the event also drove from its position at the entrance into the festival grounds and 20 people took cover in and around it.

At 8:20 a.m., an IDF tank that had been stationed at the Paga military outpost and had sustained heavy fire while battling the Hamas invasion arrived. Two of the crewmen had been killed and another, Sergeant Ofir Testa, was seriously wounded, with only the driver, Corporal Ido Somech, able to keep fighting. The tank arrived in the midst of combat between the militants and police. Upon seeing the tank, the militants halted their advance and opened fire on the tank with RPGs and gunfire. In spite of his injuries, Testa got out of the tank and gave his assault rifle to a festival security guard who was unarmed. He was then killed by gunfire as he turned to head back to the tank. The militants attempted to climb onto the tank as Somech shot at them, killing one. Somech then drove the tank out of the area, running over several abandoned vehicles and militants in the process, and stationed the tank next to the highway. Some fleeing partygoers and police officers used the tank for cover as they fled south along Route 232, while about 30 partygoers sheltered behind the tank and were defended by two brothers, Daniel and Neria Sharabi, who were both IDF infantry veterans. The Sharabi brothers entered the tank, took a gun from a dead soldier and the tank's machine gun, and used them to fend off attackers, while also applying improvised tourniquets to the wounds of partygoers. They received advice from Yoni Skrisewsky, a commander of Daniel's reserve company, over WhatsApp.

The militants continued to advance along the highway, setting fire to abandoned cars. The tank and those using it as cover continued to withdraw south from the festival area. Surviving police and festival security guards kept fighting around the tank but could no longer defend the way to the festival grounds. The retreat of the tank, police, and security guards opened the way for the militants to reach the grounds. At 8:50 a.m., the militants spotted partygoers fleeing east along the dirt path and opened fire. From 9:00 a.m. to 9:10 a.m., they abducted seven hostages who had been hiding along the sides of the highway. At 9:15 a.m., Major Avraham Hovelashvili, deputy commander of the IDF's Caracal Battalion, was killed near the festival grounds after encountering a group of militants while en route to the Sufa area to join his unit. Shortly afterwards, the commander of the militants instructed his forces to enter the festival grounds.

Dozens of Hamas fighters subsequently raided the festival grounds and established a command post. The militants killed most of the civilians they encountered and took others hostage. One attendee stated that after cutting the electricity, a group of approximately 50 Hamas gunmen arrived in vans and sprayed gunfire in all directions. The open terrain left few places to hide. Many attendees who hid in the trees were killed as militants methodically shot them. Others who hid in bushes and orchards managed to survive. The ambulance being used as cover by 20 people was hit by an RPG, killing 18. Many of the attendees attempted to call for help through phone calls and WhatsApp messages. However, it took hours for emergency responders and the military to reach the festival grounds.

Hamas fighters also engaged in sexual violence including rape, gang rape, mutilation and even post-killing rape. Many posted videos of their acts on social media to glorify their actions. Reports from groups like the Dinah Project, Association of the Rape Crisis Centers in Israel, and the Civil Commission on Oct 7th crimes document many of these cases, together with independent newspaper investigations.

Independently verified drone footage from the site showed dozens of scorched, burnt cars and skid marks. Footage of the attack, posted on a Telegram channel, included graphic depictions of killing and hostage-taking. Upon their return to Gaza City, Hamas members paraded the body of a woman in the back of a pickup truck – Shani Louk, a 22-year-old German-Israeli national. In one of the first viral videos to emerge from the attack, her body is shown clad only in underwear, while the gunmen are exclaiming "Allahu Akbar"; they were surrounded by cheering residents, some of whom spat on the body.

The Hamas militants kidnapped festival participants; videos on social media showed them being seized. It was later determined that 44 people were abducted. The abducted partygoers were taken to the Gaza Strip, where some were filmed in Hamas propaganda videos. Relatives and friends of the missing searched for information about the missing. Those abducted included 21-year-old French-Israeli woman Mia Schem and 25-year-old Israeli woman Noa Argamani. Three dual Brazilian-Israeli nationals who had attended the festival were also missing.

During the massacre, according to survivor and emergency responder testimony, Hamas militants raped women and men. According to survivor testimony released by Lahav 433, a young woman was gang raped before being killed. The testimony was published in Hebrew- and English-language Israeli news outlets. According to Haaretz police reporter Josh Breiner, ZAKA emergency response personnel found naked women with injuries and their genitals mutilated, with others found bound and naked below their waists. In July 2024, an anonymous male survivor identified as "D." recounted his rape on October 7 to Israel's Channel 12, becoming the first victim to do so.

By 9:50 a.m., the Hamas force had left the festival grounds and returned to the highway. They proceeded to Be'eri on orders of their commanders in Gaza and joined other militants carrying out the Be'eri massacre. At 10:20 a.m., dozens of Gazans unaffiliated with Hamas, some of them armed, reached the festival grounds and began to loot the bodies of the dead. At the same time, fighting continued around the tank further south along Route 232. A senior reservist officer, Brigadier General Oren Solomon, who was fighting in the area, reported the presence of numerous militants, although he was unaware of the massacre at the festival. Soldiers from the Multidimensional Unit were sent to the area but never reached the festival grounds, as they became caught up in fighting at Re'im.

At 10:25 a.m., the Hamas force that had carried out the massacre was spotted by an Israeli Air Force attack helicopter en route to Re'im as it withdrew in a convoy along Route 232. The helicopter crew, which was unaware of the festival's existence and had no contact with ground troops, decided not to open fire on the Hamas convoy, fearing potential friendly fire.

The first IDF reinforcements to arrive in the area, troops from the Givati Brigade's Shaked Battalion, arrived at 11:35 a.m. after being sent there from the West Bank by the commander of the Ephraim Regional Brigade. One of the partygoers was an off-duty soldier with the Ephraim Brigade and had called in for help. The soldiers advanced into the festival grounds at 11:50 a.m. and killed two attackers. Over the following hour, the soldiers, joined by operators of the Israel Prison Service's Metzada Unit, killed some 15 attackers in the Nova festival area. Some were from the original wave of militants who had perpetrated the massacre and had stayed behind while others were from the second wave of infiltrators. Several of the attackers were also taken alive. Additional forces reached the area at 1:00 p.m., though by this time fighting had ceased. They rescued the survivors and treated the wounded. At 3:00 p.m., the site was declared cleared of militants.

== Casualties ==
Photographs from the aftermath of the attack show dozens of bodies on the festival grounds, including a badly burned body bound by cable ties. ZAKA, Israel's volunteer community emergency response group, reported retrieving at least 260 bodies from the party grounds. The death toll was expected to rise, as other paramedic organisations also responded to the scene. On 17 November, the figure was announced as 364 dead, including 17 police officers, and 40 abducted.

In the IDF investigation, released in April 2025, the final figure was announced as 378 dead, of whom 344 were civilians. Of the 34 security personnel, 16 were soldiers, including 12 who were attending the party while off duty, another 16 were police officers, 15 of whom were killed fighting, and 2 were Shin Bet agents. The figure of those taken hostage was announced at 44. Of the victims, 171 were killed and 16 were abducted at the festival grounds and in an adjacent section of the highway. The rest were killed or abducted across the Gaza envelope, in an area spanning some 52 kilometers, as they tried to flee.

One of those killed was Nathanel Young, a British man serving in the Israeli military. Lior Asulin, a retired football striker who had played for Hapoel Tel Aviv Football Club, was also among those killed in the massacre. Journalists Shai Regev and Ayelet Arnin, who worked for the newspaper Maariv and public broadcaster Kan respectively, were also killed in the attack. The event's organisers, twins Osher Vaknin and Michael Vaknin, were killed in the attack as well.

Danielle Waldman, the youngest daughter of Israeli billionaire businessman Eyal Waldman, and her boyfriend Noam Shai were killed during the massacre. When Waldman received word that Danielle was missing, he flew back to Israel from Indonesia and tracked her location via her Apple Watch. Her body was found on 9 October.

== Investigations ==
=== Planning by Hamas ===
According to reports published on 17 November, Israeli police and security authorities concluded based on interrogations of detained Palestinians that Hamas most likely did not know about the festival beforehand but came across it by chance and decided to seize the opportunity to attack it. (Note: Organizations such as Human Rights Watch, Amnesty International and Physicians for Human Rights Israel have criticized Israel for using torture to extract testimony, and have called on the Israeli government to cease the practice.) Senior officials speculated that Hamas may have become aware of the event through drones and/or from information relayed by their operatives who were paragliding into Israeli territory, and subsequently re-directed their forces to the location using their communication system. Some of the evidence cited included Hamas militants having entered the site from a direction opposite the Gaza border, and that the festival was originally approved for only two days, and was not approved for a third day (which was the day of the massacre) until the day before the festival began. Maps of the target locations recovered from Hamas militants also did not include the festival location.

=== Friendly fire ===
According to Haaretz journalist Josh Breiner, a police source said that a police investigation indicated an IDF helicopter which had fired on Hamas militants "apparently also hit some festival participants". A statement by the Israeli police said their investigation focused on police activity and not IDF activity, and that statements in the Haaretz article had been used out of context on social media to blame Israel for civilian deaths, none of which had any basis in fact.

In September 2024 Australia's ABC News followed up on Yaniv Kubovich's July 7 article in Ha'aretz that the Hannibal Directive was "apparently applied", with "panicked" aircrews firing on vehicles containing hostages. ABC News asked the IDF about this issue, but the IDF did not answer ABC's questions, saying that "questions of this kind will be looked into at a later stage".

In the aftermath of the attack, a widely disseminated video purported to show leaked footage of an IDF helicopter shooting at civilians during the Re'im festival. However, according to France 24, the footage was actually part of a compilation showing Israeli attacks in the Gaza Strip on October 9.

=== Israeli intelligence and response time ===
According to Haaretz, Israel's domestic intelligence agency Shin Bet and IDF military commanders discussed a possible threat to the festival just hours before the attack. However, no warnings were given to the festival's organisers.

According to an investigation by journalist Avi Amit broadcast on Kan News in September 2024, Israeli Air Force commander Tomer Bar was unaware of the massacre for 10 hours. When the massacre started, the Israeli Air Force was operating at its lowest state of readiness, with only two fighter jets and two helicopters available for short notice takeoff and only one drone was flying over Gaza. The fighter jets that were scrambled were directed to protect national strategic assets such as the platform at the Leviathan gas field gas platform for hours.

The official IDF investigation of the massacre, released in April 2025, described in detail the approval process the party went through with authorities and the considerations military officials had regarding the festival prior to the attack. The festival had been pre-approved by police and military authorities: approval from the Israel Defense Forces and Israel Police is required for any large-scale civilian events taking place near Israel's borders. According to the probe, a production company behind the festival sent a request to the police to hold an event, the "Unity" festival, in the area, between October 5–6 on September 6. Police authorized the event on September 20 without initially consulting the IDF. The Northern Brigade of the IDF's Gaza Division, responsible for the defense of the area, received a request the following day, and the request was handled by a Home Front Command officer at the brigade. On September 29, the brigade commander, Colonel Haim Cohen, approved the event, judging that the deployment of air defenses in the area could adequately protect the festival. On October 2, the Home Front Command officer and an assistant to the head of the production company's security team toured the area of the festival, and during the tour a request was made to extend the event by 24 hours to enable the Nova festival to take place using the same equipment and infrastructure.

Initially, military officials were reluctant to allow the event to continue for 24 hours, as fewer troops would be deployed there over the Simchat Torah holiday weekend. On October 4, further discussions were held between IDF officials at the Gaza Division's Northern Brigade and Southern Command. Ultimately, a decision was made to approve the Nova festival, which would run from October 6 to October 7. On October 5, the festival was mentioned by the chief of operations at the Northern Brigade during a discussion. The deputy commander of the 13th Battalion of the Golani Brigade, the unit responsible for the defense of the area at the time, was present at the meeting but did not pass the information down to the soldiers on the ground. The Home Front Command officer carried out another tour of the area as the Unity festival began on October 5, and after it ended he carried out another tour of the site with the chief of operations of the Northern Brigade before the Nova festival began.

The investigation found that the IDF held no assessment for the event and no adjustments were made to defenses in the area. Soldiers deployed along the Gaza border were unaware of the event and the IDF had no military representative at the site. On the night of October 6–7, when the IDF detected and ultimately misinterpreted signs of Hamas activity and military officials held discussions on the matter, the Nova festival was not brought up and no decisions were made regarding the event.

According to the investigation, while the massacre was taking place information did not reach IDF officials in time. At the time the IDF had not put together an accurate picture of what was happening and military officials wrongly believed that the party had been fully evacuated while there were still hundreds of people on the site. There was also little to no coordination between the military and police in that area during the Hamas attack.

=== Investigations by foreign authorities ===
Within three days of the October 7 attack, the German Public Prosecutor General announced an investigation into the kidnapping and murder of German victims of the attack, which included some victims from the Nova Music Festival. Over two dozen of the 251 hostages taken into Gaza on October 7, 2023 were either dual Israeli-German citizens or were eligible to receive a German citizenship if they were descendants of German citizens (applications were fast-tracked for eligible applicants who were victims of the attack). Dual Israeli-German citizens who were kidnapped and/or murdered at the Nova Music Festival included Shani Louk, Rom Braslavski, and Alon Ohel.

== Palestinian statements ==
Hamas initially denied the occurrence of the massacre and the killing of civilians. In an interview on October 10, Mousa Abu Marzook of the Hamas political wing claimed the group's fighters may have mistaken the festival attendees for off-duty IDF soldiers. Hamas later claimed that its forces never targeted civilians but that the massacre may have been carried out by independent groups of Gazan civilians after Hamas had defeated the Israeli forces in the region.

On 19 November, the Palestinian Authority (PA) denied that Hamas conducted the massacre in a statement sent to foreign ministries worldwide and to the United Nations. The PA stated that Israeli helicopters bombed civilians after the Hannibal Directive was activated, though the directive is claimed by Israel to have been canceled in 2016. The U.S. National Security Council spokesman says that the PA later said this was not its official position.

== Aftermath ==
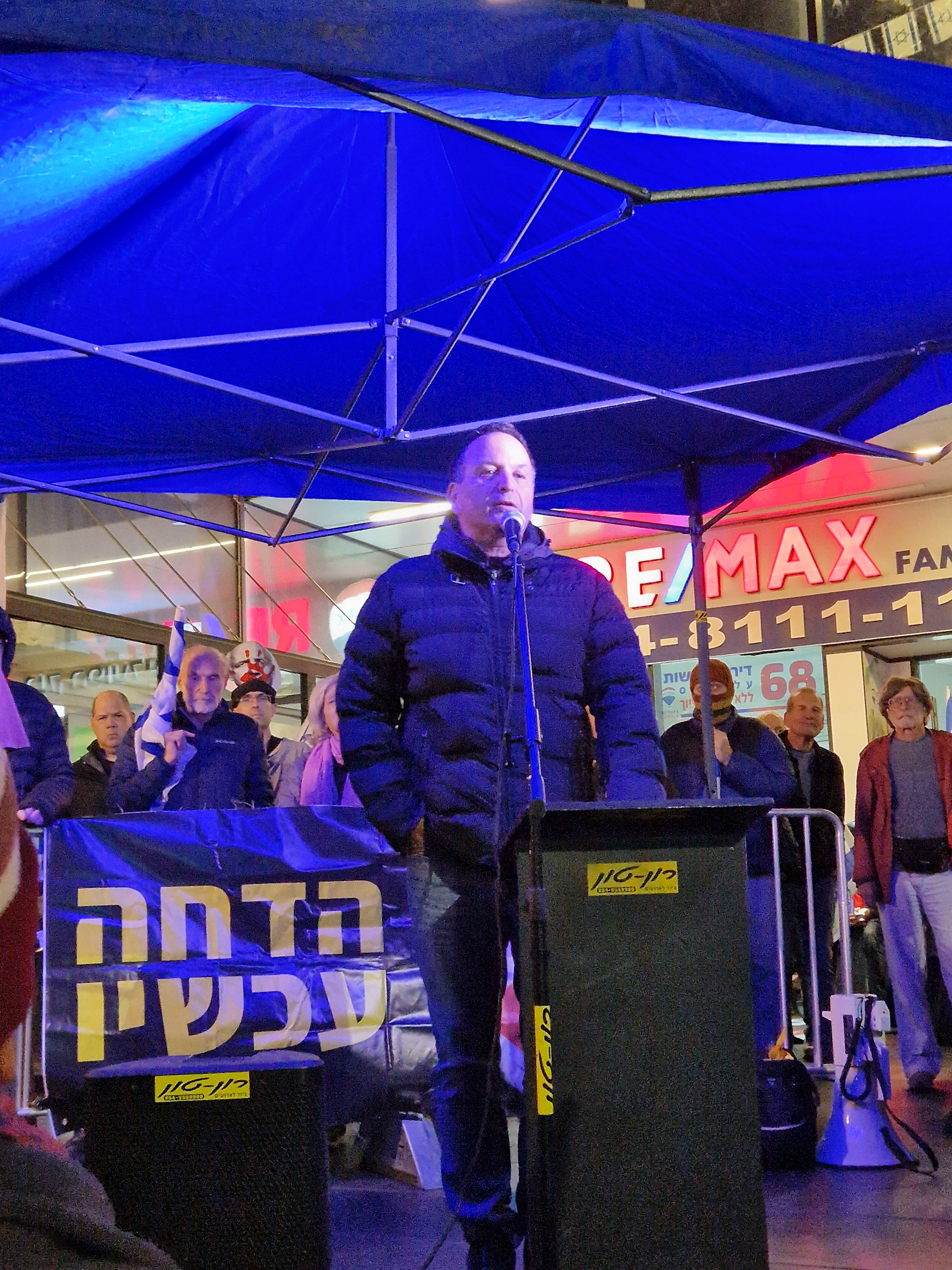
Eran Litman, the father of Oriya Litman who was killed by Hamas at Re'im music festival massacre, speaks at an event in Haifa

In response to this massacre, as well as other massacres and attacks in what Hamas called "Operation Al-Aqsa Flood", Israel formally declared war on Hamas and initiated the Gaza war (named "Operation Swords of Iron").

On October 8, looters gained access to the festival site–which had been declared a closed military zone–and stole items belonging to the victims, including money, electronics and identification documents. They were reportedly allowed to pass a security checkpoint and enter the site when one of them claimed to be a local resident.

Family members of the victims of the festival and the Psyduck festival together formed the Party Youth Forum to demand the establishment of a third-party investigation committee, which would potentially identify any negligence leading up to the 7 October attacks. On 1 January 2024, 42 survivors of the massacre filed a lawsuit seeking 200 million NIS in damages from the IDF, Shin Bet and the Israel Police.

Shortly after the attack, spaces were created to allow survivors and victims' families to reflect and heal from the attack, with a variety of treatments provided to help them process the mental trauma. Items recovered from the festivals grounds that were not claimed or identified, were brought to another similar event in the Sdot Yam kibbutz.

In late January 2024, a memorial on the site was opened to tourists, family, and friends of victims to learn about the attack, the victims, and survivors and pay tribute to them. That same month, the families of victims planted trees inside the area of the festival to commemorate the deceased victims.

During a State Audit Commission on the treatment of survivors of the 7 October attacks at the Knesset in April 2024, a survivor spoke out about the psychological damage the attack had caused. He indicated that many survivors were forcibly hospitalized due to psychological state, could not get out of bed, and that there had been some 50 suicides by survivors between October 2023 and April 2024. The Israeli Ministry of Health stated it could not confirm the claim of suicides made by the survivor.

On 20 October 2024, Shirel Golan, a survivor of the massacre, committed suicide on her 22nd birthday after suffering from PTSD symptoms since the event. Roei Shalev, a survivor who was injured and lost his partner and friend during the massacre, also committed suicide on 10 October 2025.

Singer Yuval Raphael, another survivor of the massacre, went on to represent Israel in the Eurovision Song Contest 2025, where she finished in second place.

=== Compensation for survivors ===
The National Insurance Institute formally recognised the trauma and damage suffered by the survivors of the massacre. Survivors can submit claims for recognition as victims of work-related injuries and as casualties of hostile actions. Individuals are eligible for various privileges, including financial aid, medical and psychological assistance, legal representation, and compensation for any property losses or damages.

=== Lawsuit against UNWRA ===
Yonatan Samerano attended the festival and escaped to nearby Be'eri, where he was murdered, and his body was abducted to Gaza. (Note: his body was recovered by the IDF June 22, 2025) In December 2024, after the IDF alleged that Samerano's body was transported to Gaza by Faisal Ali Mussalem al-Naami, an UNRWA employee, Samerano's parents filed a lawsuit against UNRWA, as well as against its Commissioners-general, Philippe Lazzarini. The lawsuit was filed with the help of NGO Shurat HaDin.

== Hostages taken from the music festival ==
A total of 44 hostages were taken from the music festival. The last eleven living hostages were released on 13 October 2025.

=== Rescue operations ===
The Yamam, Shin Bet and Israel Defense Forces carried out a rescue operation in the Nuseirat refugee camp on 8 June 2024 in which they successfully rescued four hostages taken from the Nova Music Festival:

- Noa Argamani
- Almog Meir Jan
- Andrey Kozlov
- Shlomi Ziv

The operation was later renamed Operation Arnon, in honor of Arnon Zamora, a Yamam officer who was killed in the line of duty during the operation.

=== Recovery operations ===
The Israel Defense Forces recovered the bodies of 15 people who were kidnapped from the music festival to Gaza. Unless otherwise noted, the victims are believed to have been murdered during the kidnapping, with the bodies taken hostage.

- The Israeli military announced on December 1, 2023 that it had recovered Ofir Tsarfati's body. (Note: Eight months after the recovery of Tsarfati's body, Hamas released a photo of his body purporting the photo to be evidence of their claim that one of their operatives assigned to guard Israeli hostages had recently killed a hostage in an act of revenge. On October 27, 2025 Hamas returned to Israel remnants of his body not recovered in 2023.)
- Eden Zecharya's body was recovered December 12, 2023. Her exact date of death is unknown. She is only known to have been kidnapped with "wounds in the upper body." The son of former IDF Chief of Staff, Gadi Eizenkot, was killed in action during the recovery operation.
- Elia Toledano's body was recovered December 15, 2023. Toledano was the boyfriend of Mia Schem, who was also taken hostage and released two weeks earlier. He is believed to have been killed on November 10, 2023 by an IDF airstrike targeting Hamas commander, Ahmed Ghandour.
- The bodies of three hostages were recovered on May 17, 2024.
  - Shani Louk
  - Amit Buskila
  - Itzhak Gelerenter
- Two bodies were recovered May 24, 2024:
  - Orión Hernández Radoux, a French-Mexican national who was the boyfriend of fellow hostage Shani Louk. His body was flown to Mexico for burial.
  - Hanan Yablonka

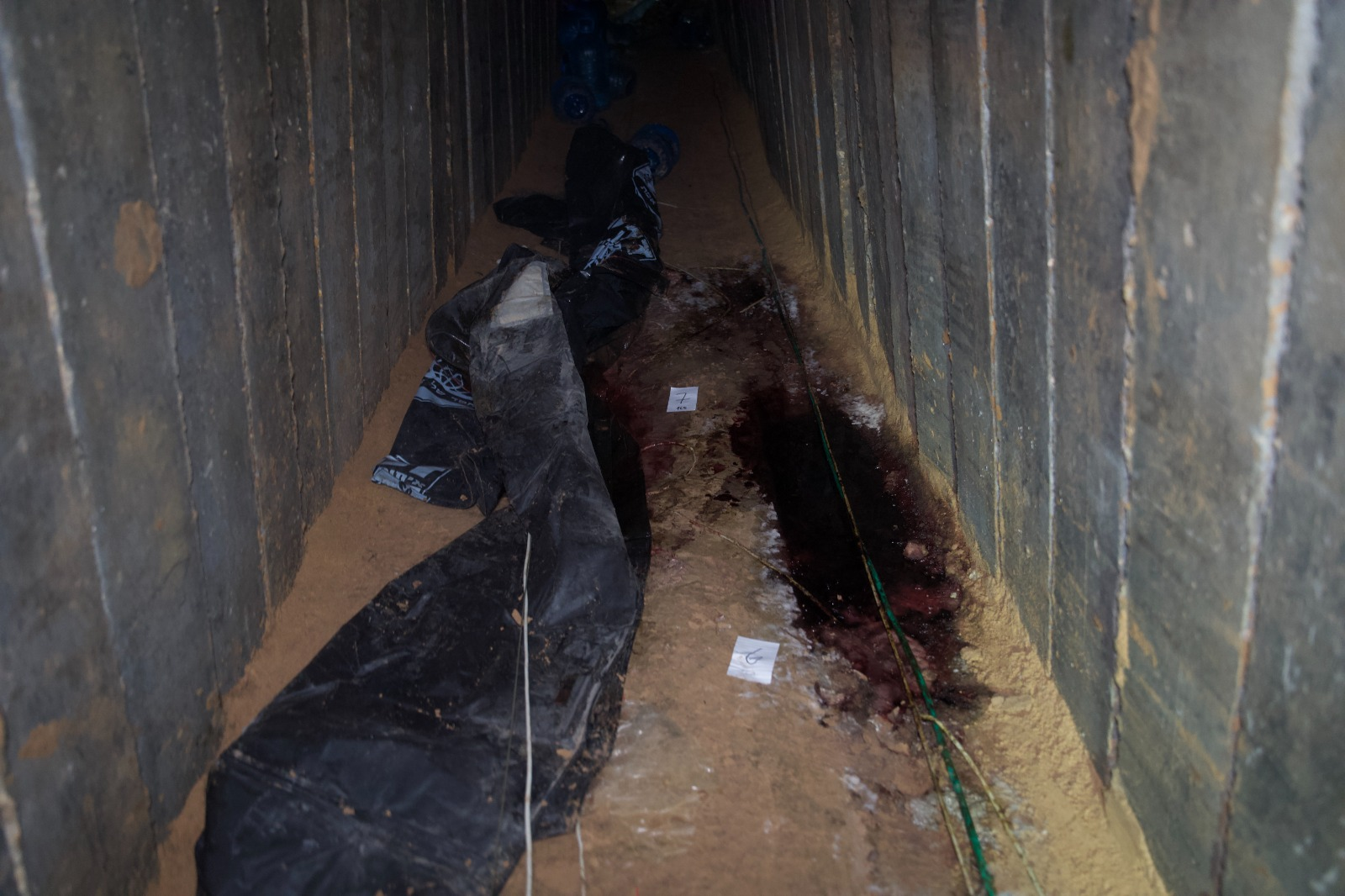
The tunnel in Gaza where the bodies of six hostages were found by Israeli forces on August 31, 2024. Five of the six hostages were kidnapped from the Nova Music Festival.

- The bodies of five hostages were recovered on August 31, 2024. They are believed to have been executed by Hamas from "close range" 2–3 days earlier
  - Hersh Goldberg-Polin
  - Ori Danino (Note: Danino managed to escape the music festival, but chose to go back to the scene in order to help rescue others, at which time he was taken hostage. His actions were credited with saving the lives of an unspecified number of people.)
  - Alexander Lobanov
  - Almog Sarusi
  - Eden Yerushalmi
- Jonathan Samerano's body was recovered June 22, 2025. He managed to flee the scene of the festival, but was killed in nearby Kibbutz Be'eri with his body taken hostage to Gaza.
- Idan Shtavi's body was recovered on August 29, 2025

=== Released hostages ===
Hamas released 21 of the 44 people who were taken hostage from the music festival:

- Maya Regev was released on November 25, 2023. Regev was released walking on crutches. She suffered a gunshot wound to the foot, and did not get discharged from the hospital until June 10, 2024.
- Maya's brother, Itay Regev, was released November 29, 2023.
- Roni Krivoi was released November 26, 2023. Krivoi is a dual Israeli-Russian citizen, and his release was a gesture towards Vladimir Putin. After his release, he said that he managed to escape during his captivity, taking advantage of the chaos that ensued when the apartment building in which he was being held collapsed due to Israeli air raids. After four days of trying to make his way back to Israel, he was captured by local residents who beat him up and turned him over back to Hamas.
- Moran Stella Yanai was released November 29, 2023.
- Mia Schem was released November 30, 2023.
- Romi Gonen was released January 19, 2025.
- Or Levy was released February 8, 2025.
- Three hostages were released on February 22, 2025.
  - Omer Shem Tov
  - Eliya Cohen
  - Omer Wenkert
- Eleven hostages were released on October 13, 2025 as part of the first phase of the Gaza peace plan.
  - Elkana Bohbot
  - Rom Braslavski
  - Evyatar David
  - Guy Gilboa-Dalal
  - Maxim Herkin
  - Segev Kalfon
  - Bar Kupershtein
  - Eitan Mor
  - Yosef Chaim Ohana
  - Alon Ohel
  - Avinatan Or, boyfriend of Noa Argamani who was also taken hostage, and rescued 16 months earlier

=== Bodies returned ===
Hamas returned three bodies following the Gaza peace plan going into effect.

- Guy Illouz's body was returned on October 13, 2025, with the confirmation coming the following day. Illouz is known to have been taken hostage alive, with a previously released hostage telling that she was treated next to him in a Gaza hospital
- Uriel Baruch's body was returned on October 14, 2025, with the confirmation coming the following day. The IDF has determined that he was murdered on the day of the massacre, and his body was kidnapped to Gaza.
- Inbar Haiman's body was returned on October 15, 2025, with the confirmation coming the following day. Haiman is known to have been abducted alive, having appeared in a video posted by Hamas to Telegram in which she is surrounded by her captors. On June 22, 2025, Haiman became the last female hostage from the October 7 attacks to be held by Hamas when the IDF recovered the body of the second to last female hostage.

=== Kidnapped and held hostage elsewhere within Israel ===
East Jerusalem Palestinian Suhaib Abu Amer Razeem was kidnapped from the music festival to nearby Be'eri where militants used him as a translator at a hostage standoff. Razeem did not survive.

Suhaib Abu Amer Razeem was a 22-year-old Palestinian from East Jerusalem, with family living in Gaza. He was at the site of the music festival, working as a bus driver transporting music festival attendees. When Hamas militants encountered him, they interrogated him to determine his background and why he was present at the site. While at least one of the militants proposed to let him go due to him being an Arab, the militants ultimately decided to kidnap Razeem and used him as a translator in a hostage standoff at kibbutz Be'eri nearby.

Using the hostages as human shields, Hamas threatened to execute the hostages if the IDF were to engage in battle. When the standoff ended, Razeem was one of the 14 out of the 15 hostages who did not survive. Rezeem's body was not discovered for 12 days, and it is still not known whether he was killed by the Hamas hostage takers or by IDF gunfire. He was subsequently buried in Jerusalem.

Razeem's brother claimed that when he approached authorities about his missing brother, he encountered initial skepticism, with an officer allegedly telling him "go to Hamas and ask them to bring back your brother."

Two additional hostages in the Be'eri hostage standoff, Yasmin Porat and her boyfriend, Tal Katz, had escaped from the Nova Music Festival to Be'eri prior to being taken hostage in Be'eri. They are not counted as hostage victims of the music festival since they managed to escape the festival. Porat survived, but Katz did not.

== Depiction in media ==
On 6 December, a documentary titled #Nova was aired on Yes Docu, recreating the events of the massacre. The documentary uses videos taken on site, phone call recordings and WhatsApp conversations. As a precedent, Yes announced that it would allow any television channel and broadcaster to show the film for free, and also uploaded the full film to its official YouTube channel.

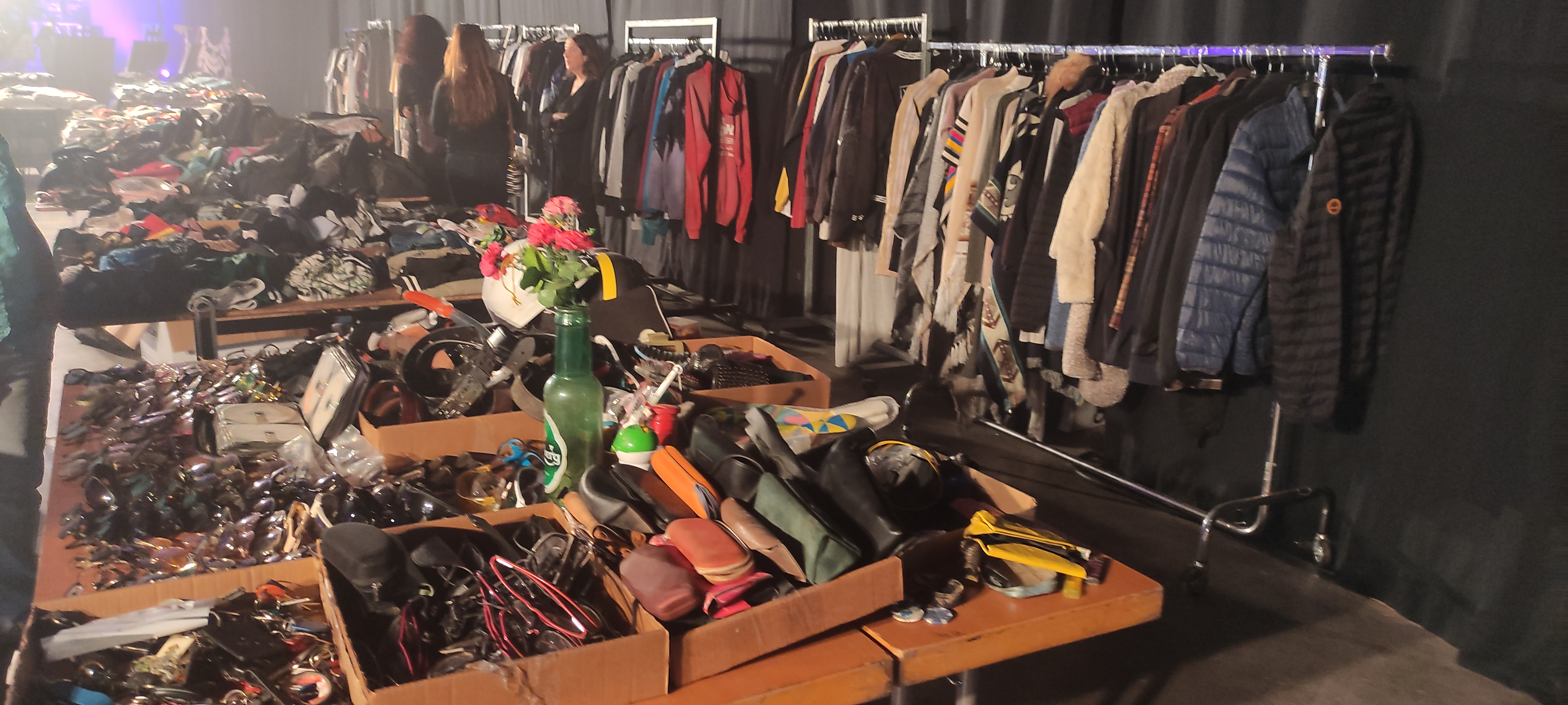
Unclaimed items left on the festival grounds that were collected and displayed as part of the 06:29 performance

Supernova: Music Festival Massacre is another documentary about the massacre. Created by Yossi Bloch, Noam Pinchas, and Duki Dror, the documentary narrates the experiences of survivors through interviews and real-time video footage. It also incorporates a limited amount of video captured by the perpetrators. It has been acquired by broadcasters in the United Kingdom, France, Germany, Italy, Sweden, Denmark, and other countries worldwide.

On 26 September 2024, the BBC, Paramount+ and Israel's Hot broadcast a documentary titled We Will Dance Again about the festival massacre.

In early 2025, Canadian filmmaker Chris Atkins and human rights advocate Majed el-Shafie released Dying to Live, a documentary exploring the October 7 attacks and the Nova festival massacre through the perspectives of non-Jewish victims, first responders, and foreign nationals.

== Tributes ==
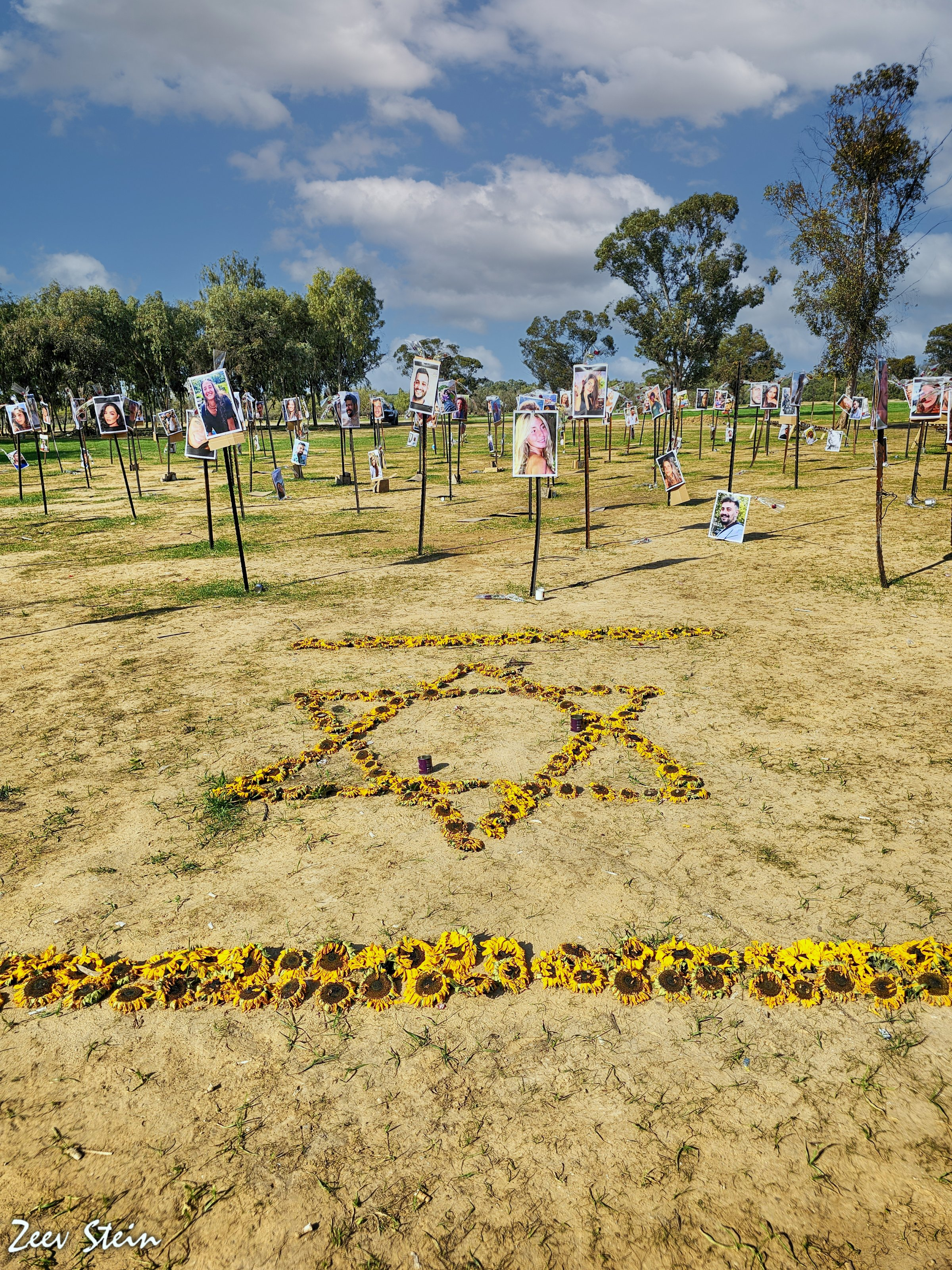
A December 2023 photo of the site of the massacre, after it was turned into a memorial

On 9 October, two days after the massacre, Irish rock band U2 paid tribute to the victims during a Las Vegas concert by performing "Pride (In the Name of Love)" with modified lyrics to reference the massacre. Five Israeli DJs, including Skazi, performed a set during a memorial on 28 November 2023, at the site of the festival. Film makers Reinhardt Beetz, Duki Dror and Danna Stern made a documentary titled Supernova: The Music Festival Massacre.

On 5 February 2024, the 66th Annual Grammy Awards paid tribute to the victims of the massacre. Recording Academy CEO Harvey Mason Jr. led the tribute, delivering eulogies, while a string quartet composed of musicians from Israeli, Palestinian, and Arab backgrounds provided musical accompaniment.

During the 2024 Paris Olympics, the Israeli sailing pair Nitai Hasson and Noa Lasry named their dinghy "Nova" as a tribute to the victims of the massacre.

On 18 November 2024, during the ADL-organized "In Concert Against Hate" in Washington, D.C., Sia dedicated a slow rendition of "Titanium" in honor of the survivors of the massacre.

== Memorials ==
Drone view Nova Festival Victims Memorial at the massacre site

The massacre at the music festival has been memorialized in several different ways.

- The Nova Festival Victims Memorial at the site where the music festival took place
- The Car Wall in Tkuma where victims' burned and damaged cars have been gathered
- A traveling exhibition (see below)

=== Traveling exhibition ===
In December 2023, activists, including producers of the festival, organised the "6:29" exhibition at Expo Tel Aviv, which recreated the massacre site in detail. It was one of the first physical memorials of the 7 October attacks. The exhibit, named for the minute the music at the festival ceased in response to sirens of incoming rockets, included a reconstructed dance floor, incinerated cars, bullet-ridden portable toilets, piles of personal items, and tributes to the victims. Israeli President Isaac Herzog spoke at opening of the exhibition on December 6. The exhibition lasted for 10 weeks.

The exhibition was brought to the United States by Scooter Braun, Joe Teplow, and Josh Kadden.

The Nova Music Festival Exhibition opened in New York City on April 21. The exhibition, dedicated to the survivors of the massacre, features tents, blankets, personal objects, and mobile phones displaying videos recorded during the attack. On 10 June 2024, anti-Israel protesters organized by the Within Our Lifetime organization arrived at the exhibition, setting off flares, flying flags of Hamas and Hezbollah, and chanting slogans such as "Long live October 7". Nerdeen Kiswani, founder of the organization, characterized the exhibition as "propaganda used to justify the genocide in Palestine", and called the music festival "a rave next to a concentration camp."

The protest was condemned by local and national politicians, including New York City mayor Eric Adams and White House spokesperson Andrew Bates. Originally planned to only stay open in New York until May 23, the exhibition was extended until June 22. During its time in New York, the exhibition attracted 113,000 visitors including New York City mayor Eric Adams and New York governor Kathy Hochul.

After leaving New York, the exhibition came to Culver City, a suburb of Los Angeles, opening on August 17. The exhibition was scheduled to last until mid-October, but was extended to November 3. During its time in Los Angeles, the exhibition attracted 170,000 visitors. An abridged version of the exhibition opened at the ballroom of the Weitzman National Museum of American Jewish History in Philadelphia, where it was on from October 6 to the 13.

The exhibition then travelled to Miami, where it opened on December 18, 2024, and was expected to last until February 16, 2025. On January 16, 2025, Sara Netanyahu and Noa Argamani visited the exhibition in Miami. Argamani recounted her experience as a hostage held by Hamas in Gaza. A month later, Argamani made a second public appearance at the exhibition in Miami, this time alongside special envoy Steve Witkoff who pledged to continue working for the release of all the hostages still held by Hamas.

On April 23, 2025, the exhibition opened in Toronto. The exhibition was expected to stay open until June 8, but was extended to June 22. Canadian prime minister Mark Carney made a private visit to the exhibition on June 9, which brought him to tears. The exhibition moved to Washington D.C. on June 14 and was expected to stay open until July 6.

During the exhibition's run in Culver City, a former hostage reclaimed a sweatshirt she lost at the site, and when the exhibition was in Miami, the father of one of the victims of the massacre found the shoes that he had given his son.

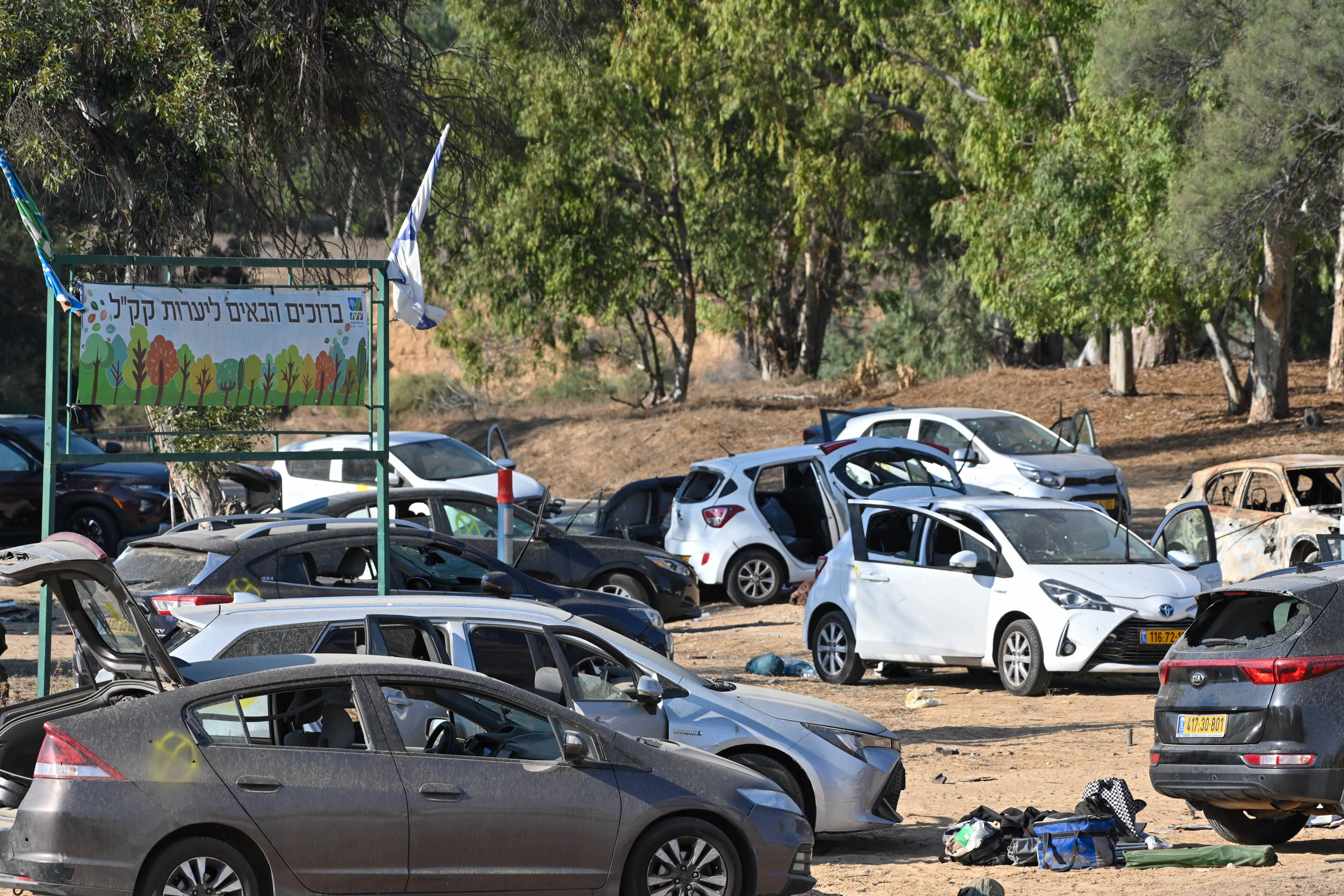
Abandoned and damaged cars parked at the festival, 12 October. Most of the vehicles ultimately ended up at The Car Wall in Tkuma.

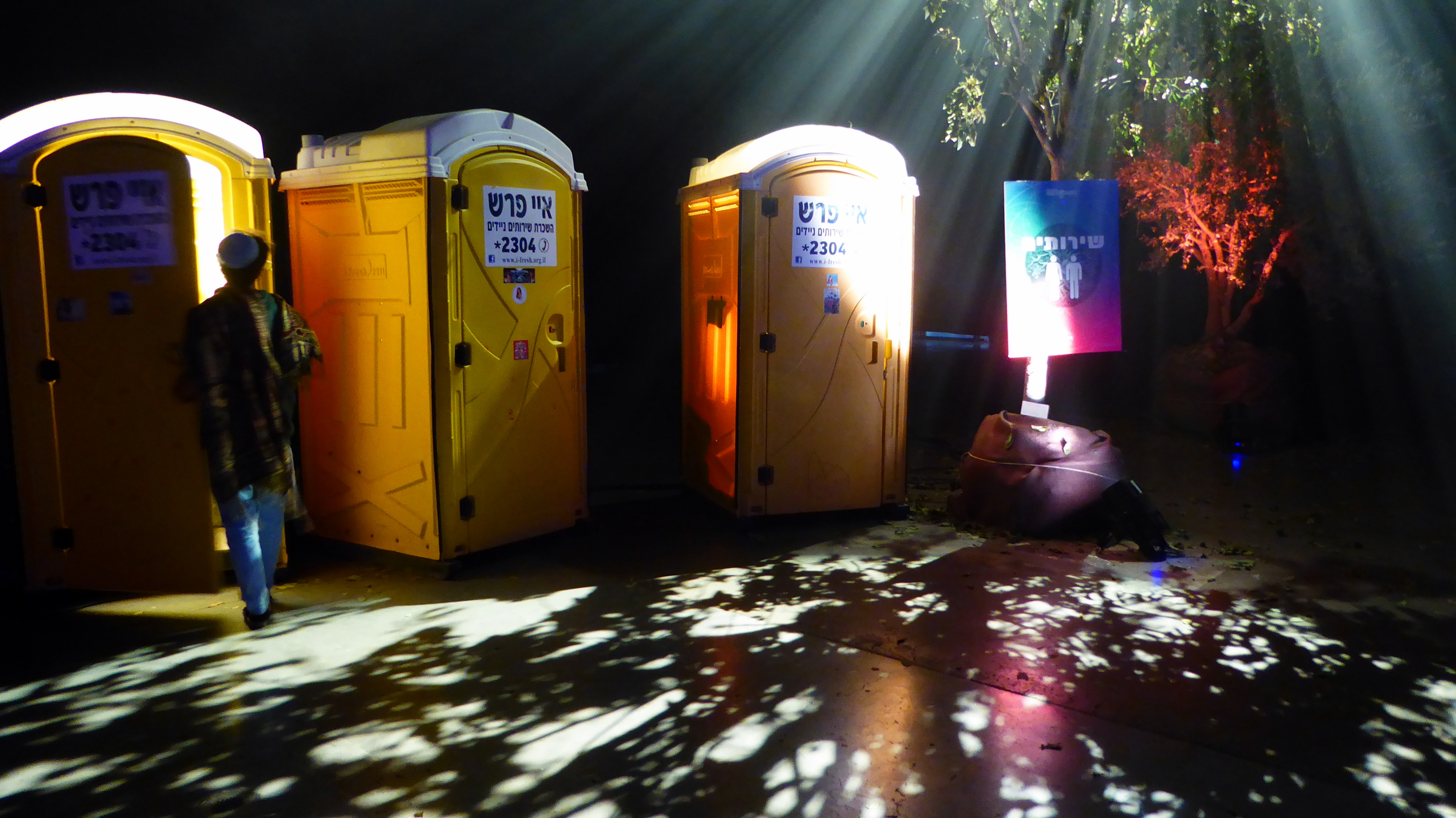
The original toilets from the festival, which were used in the commemorative performance 06:29

== See also ==
- Battle of Re'im – 2023 Hamas attack on an Israeli military base as part of the same offensive
- Coastal Road massacre – 1978 hijacking of an Israeli bus by Palestinian militants near Tel Aviv
- Dolphinarium discotheque massacre – 2001 Hamas attack in the Israeli city of Tel Aviv
- Killing of Shani Louk – 2023 killing of Nova music festival attendee in Israel
- Awad Darawshe – Israeli-Arab paramedic and victim of Hamas
- List of massacres in Israel
- List of terrorist incidents in 2023
- Moshe Dayan's eulogy for Ro'i Rothberg – Speech by Moshe Dayan, 1956
- Outline of the Gaza war
- Palestinian political violence
- Psyduck music festival massacre – 2023 mass murder in southern Israel
- We Will Dance Again – 2024 American documentary film
