= Chronology of Aliyah in modern times =

Chronology of Aliyah in modern times breaks down the various waves of Aliyah, the migration of Jews to Israel in modern times, that have occurred from the 19th century to today.

== Until the period of the First Aliyah ==
- In 1561, Tiberias was reestablished. During the same year Gracia Mendes Nasi and Joseph Nasi established in addition to Tiberias seven more Jewish villages.
- At the start of the 19th century, a group of students of the Vilna Gaon immigrated to the land of Israel and renewed the Jewish settlement in Safed and surrounding area, and reinforced the Jewish settlement in Jerusalem and Hebron.
- In 1860 Jewish neighborhoods were first established outside of the walls of the Old City of Jerusalem.
- In 1870, the first Jewish agricultural school, Mikveh Israel was established.

Non-Jewish immigrants also immigrated. In 1867, with the conclusion of the construction of the Suez Canal, many Egyptian workers could not return to their homes in Egypt, which had been occupied during their absence, and many of them settled in Palestine. In 1857, the Ottoman authorities encouraged people from all over the world to come and inhabit the land. American colonists, German Templers, and Algerian refugees (who fled a coup) answered the call. Amongst them was the al-Husayni clan, the family of Mohammad Amin al-Husayni. During the same period Chechen and Bosnian immigrants also immigrated to the country.

== During the period of the First Aliyah 1882–1904 ==
Year	Kibbutzim	Moshavim	Local councils	Towns	Community settlements	Additional comments
1878			Gai Oni	Petah Tikva		Petah Tikva was first established next to the village Umlebs which was situated next to the Yarkon River. Gai Oni was abandoned and in 1882 at the same spot, Rosh Pinna was established.
1882			Rosh Pinna	Rishon LeZion; Zikhron Ya'akov		
1883			Mazkeret Batya	Ness Ziona		
1884						Neve Tzedek was established – the first Jewish neighborhood in Jaffa which became through the years part of the city Tel Aviv.
1887			Gedera			
1889		Bat Shlomo				
1890				Rehovot		
1891				Hadera		
1896			Metula			
1899		Ilaniya				
1900				Beersheba		During this year the Arab city in which there was a meager Jewish community which eventually grew and became a Jewish city only in 1948, after the 1948 Arab-Israeli War.
1901			Kfar Tavor			
1903				Kfar Saba	Atlit	

== During the period of the Second Aliyah 1904–1914 ==
Year	Kibbutzim	Moshavim	Local councils	Towns	Community settlements	Additional comments
1905	Tel Hai					
1908	Kinneret	Mitzpa				
1909	Degania Alef			Tel Aviv is established under the name Ahuzat Bayit		abandoned
1910	Degania Alef					Reestablished
1911		Ben Shemen				Reestablished in 1952
1912		Kfar Uria				Established for the first time in this year but was destroyed during the 1929 Palestine riots. Reestablished in 1944 and was destroyed again in the 1948 Arab-Israeli War. Reestablished for the last time in 1949.
1913				Karkur		Karkur was merged with Pardes Hanna in 1969.

== During the period of the British Mandate of Palestine 1917–1948 ==
Year	Kibbutzim	Moshavim	Local councils	Towns	Community settlements	Additional comments
1920	Degania Bet	Beit Yatir				
1921	Tel Yosef; Ein Harod; Gan Shmuel	Nahalal		Ramat Gan		
1922	Beit Alfa			Giv'atayim; Ra'anana		
1923				Ramat HaSharon		
1924		*Magdiel		Herzliya; Bnei Brak		*Was merged in 1964 with 3 more settlements to form Hod HaSharon
1925	Givat HaShlosha	Ramatayim				Was merged in 1964 with 3 more settlements to form Hod HaSharon
1926	Ramat David	Beit She'arim (moshav)		Bat Yam; Karkur		Karkur was merged in 1969 with Pardes Hanna
1927	Beit Zera; Ein Shemer; Shefayim	*Hadar				*Was merged in 1964 with 3 more settlements to form Hod HaSharon
1928	Beit HaShita	Ganei Hadar				
1929			Netanya; Pardes Hanna			
1930	Na'an					
1931	Ein HaHoresh; Kvutzat Yavne		Kvutzat Yavne			
1932	Ma'abarot; Afikim	Avihayil; Tel-Tzur (Was merged later on with Even Yehuda); Beer Ganim (Was merged later on with Even Yehuda); Ramat Tyumakin (Was merged later on with Netanya); Neta'im; Ganei Am	Even Yehuda			
1933	Mishmarot; Givat Haim	Eliashiv	Ramot HaShavim			
1934				Kiryat Bialik		
1936	Tel Amal (today called Nir David)	Kfar Hittim		Holon		
1937	Sde Nahum; Usha; Ginosar; Tirat Zvi; Sha'ar HaGolan; Masada; Ein HaShofet; Ein Gev; Maoz Haim; Kfar Szold	Tzur Moshe; B'nai B'rith (Moledet); Mishmar HaShlosha; Beit Yosef	Kfar Shmaryahu			
1938	Ma'ale HaHamisha; Alonim; Hanita; Ein HaMifratz; Tel Yitzhak; Eilon; Kfar Masaryk; Ma'ayan Tzvi; Neve Eitan; Kfar Ruppin; Mesilot	Beit Yehoshua; Geulim; Sharona; Sde Warburg; Ramat Hadar (Was merged in 1964 with 3 more settlements to form Hod HaSharon)	Shavei Tzion			
1939	Dahlia; Dafna; Dan; Sde Eliyahu; Mahanayim; HaZore'im; Gesher; Negba; Kfar Glikson; Hamadia; Beit Oren; Amir; Afek	Kfar Netter; Mishmar HaYam; Shadmot Dvora; Tel-Tzur; Kfar Warburg		Kiryat Ono		
1940		Beit Hillel; The settlement was originally established in this year, it was abandoned after a few years and later on was reestablished again in 1949.	Pardesiya			
1943	Gvulot; Yad Mordechai					
1944			Giv'at Shmuel			
1945	Hokuk; Even Yitzhak					
1946	Urim; Be'eri; Gal On; Hatzerim; Yehiam; Mishmar HaNegev; Nirim; Shoval; Ein Tzurim; Ami'ad; Regba; Dovrat	Kfar Darom; Nevatim; Kedma; Tkuma; Kfar Monash				
1947	Eyal; Sa'ad; Revadim (Was established in this year in Gush Etzion but with the evacuation of the area it was moved to its present position in 1948.); HaOgen; Ma'ayan Barukh; Mashabei Sadeh; Sufa; Tze'elim; Mivtahim; Gevim; Alumot ( Was originally established in this year and abandoned in 1968, was established again in 1969)					
1948	Netzer Sereni; Netiv HaLamed-Heh; HaGoshrim; Tzova; Revadim (Was established already in 1947 in Gush Etzion but with the evacuation of the area it was moved to its present position in 1948.); Shluhot; Reshafim; Bror Hayil; Nahsholim; Shomrat; Sa'ar; *Sha'ar HaGolan	Bethlehem of Galilee (Was established already in 1906 as a Moshava of Templers which were expelled during the 1948 Arab-Israeli War and instead a Moshav was established at this location); Kfar Chabad; Timorim; Nordia; Ramat Raziel; HaYogev; Herev Le'et; Shoresh; Bustan HaGalil		Beersheba (Even though the Jewish settlement in the city started with its establishment in 1900, it only became a Jewish city from this year and onwards. Yehud	*Was already established in 1937 but was abandoned in during the 1948 Arab-Israeli War and was reestablished during that year.	

== Since the Declaration of Independence and until the Six-Day War 1948–1967 ==
Year	Kibbutzim	Moshavim	Local councils	Towns	Community settlements	Additional comments
1949	Rosh HaNikra, HaSolelim, HaOn, Palmachim, Erez, Beit Guvrin, Beit HaEmek, Beit Kama, Bnei Re'em, Bar'am, Barkai, Zikim, Gesher HaZiv, Neve Ur, Kabri, Gadot, Lahavot Haviva, Mefalsim, Nir Yitzhak, She'ar Yashuv, Lohamey HaGeta'ot, Nave Yair, Re'im, Magen, Hamadia, Lavi	Liman, Elkosh, HaBonim, Gilat, Aviel, Burgata, Beit Gamliel, *Beit Hillel, Beit Zeit, Bnei Darom, Be'erotayim, Tzippori, Kfar HaNagid, Hatzav, Tirat Yehuda, Ein Ayala, Hagor, Azaria, Elifelet, Tifrah, Ramot Meir, Nir Galim, Amqa, Ben Ami, Kfar Uria (Was built in the same location for the third time after it was built there already in 1912 and in 1944)	Ganei Tikva	Beit She'an, Rosh HaAyin	*Arbel; Poria – Kfar Avoda	*Beit Hillel was reestablished during that year even though it was already established in 1940 but was abandoned a few years later. *Arbel was established in this year as community settlement and by 1959 became a Moshav ovdim.
1950	Gazit, Ein HaShlosha, Nir Eliyahu	Avigdor, Even Sapir, Ora, Ahuzam, Ahihud, Bitha, Beit Ezra, Ben Zakai, Berekhya, Gimzo, Gan Sorek, Zeitan, Yakhini, Yatzitz, Yish'i, Yashresh, Kfar Shmuel, Mivtahim, Nehora, Naham, Netiv HaShayara, Peduim, Patish, Ranen, Sde Eliezer, Shuva, Tlamim		Beit Shemesh, Kiryat Malakhi, Kiryat Shmona	Kfar Hasidim Bet	
1951	Betzet, Dvir, Kfar Aza, Yotvata, Kissufim, *Nahal Oz	Beit HaGadi, Sharsheret, Margaliot, *Beit Yosef	Yeruham, Mevaseret Zion	Eilat; Ashkelon	Eshel HaNasi	*Nahal Oz was established in this year as a Nahal settlement, a permanent residency in this location began in 1953; *Beit Yosef was reestablished after it was destroyed in the 1948 Arab-Israeli War
1952	Givat Haim, Lahav	Orot, Ben Shemen (was reestablished in this year after it had already been established in 1911), Bareket, Givolim, Shibolim, Alonei Abba, Kfar Aviv, Ginaton, Sde Yitzhak			Magalim	
1953	Ashdot Ya'akov Ihud; Ashdot Ya'akov Meuhad; Nahal Oz (was established in 1951 as a Nahal settlement, a permanent residency in this location began only in this year); Metzer	Brosh; Ta'ashur; Tidhar; Zru'a; Talmei Bilu; Pa'amei Tashaz; Sde Tzvi; Avital; Yuval; Mlilot; Dishon; Yad Natan; Menuha	Neve Monosson	Migdal HaEmek, Sderot	Poria – Neve Oved	
1954	Bahan	Eshbol; Nevatim		Kiryat Gat		
1955		Amatzia		Ofakim, Dimona		
1956				Ashdod, Netivot		
1957	Or HaNer; Beit Nir	Even Shmuel; Ilaniya				
1958	Adamit	Aviezer; Givat Yeshayahu				
1959		Arbel				
1960	Ein Hatzeva; Even Menachem					
1962	Eilot	Avivim		Arad		
1963	Grofit					
1964			Mitzpe Ramon	Hod HaSharon was established as a merger of several Moshavot		
1965		Hatzeva				

== 1967–2011 ==
Year	Kibbutzim	Moshavim	Local councils	Towns	Community settlements	Additional comments
1967	Kfar Etzion	Ein Yahav				
1968		Eliad (Was established during this year as a Nahal settlement, a permanent residency in this location began in 1970); Argaman (Was established during this year as a Nahal settlement, a permanent residency in this location began in 1971); Givat Yoav				
1969		Ohad	Merge between Pardes Hanna and Karkur (See Pardes Hanna-Karkur			
1970		Tzofar; Neot HaKikar; Eliad (was established in 1968 as a Nahal settlement, a permanent residency in this location began during that year)			Alon Shvut	
1971	El Rom	Argaman (Was established already in 1968 as a Nahal settlement, a permanent residency in this location began during that year)				
1972	Afik	Hatzeva (the settlement was established in 1965 as a Nahal settlement, a permanent residency in this location began during that year); Bnei Yehuda				
1973	Kfar Haruv	Ketura	Netzer Hazani			
1976	Samar					
1977	Beit Rimon (Was established during this year as a Nahal settlement, a permanent residency in this location began in 1979)		Bethel, Mitzpeh Yericho			
1978	Ortal	Avnei Eitan; Aniam; Bnei Atzmon		Ariel	Sapir; Neve Zohar	
1979	Eshbal (The settlement was established during this year as a Nahal settlement); Beit Rimon (was established in 1977 as a Nahal settlement, a permanent residency in this location began in this year)	Ashalim; Bedolah (Was established during this year as a Nahal settlement, a permanent residency in this location began in 1982)			Avshalom	
1980		Idan				
1981		Odem (Although the foundation of this village was established already in 1975, a permanent residency in this location began only in this year); Alonei HaBashan (it was established during this year by the Nahal group in this location. the village was officially established 1982)			Barkan	
1982		Ein Tamar; Alonei HaBashan (The village was established in 1981 when the Nahal group settled in this location but it was finally settled in this year); Bedolah (The village was already established in 1979 as a Nahal settlement, a permanent residency in this location began in this year)			Eshkolot (Was established as a Nahal settlement); Adora (Was established in this year as a Nahal settlement, a permanent residency in this location began in 1984); Kalanit, Israel	
1983	Lotan; Elifaz	Har Brakha (The settlement was established as a Nahal settlement. A permanent residency in this location began in this year); Beit Hagai; Har Amasa; Elei Sinai; Oshrat				
1984					Adora (The village was established already in 1982 as a Nahal settlement, a permanent residency in this location began in this year); Geva Binyamin	
1985					Shaharut	
1986			*Kokhav Ya'ir		Eshhar	*Merged in 2003 with Tzur Yigal
1987					Nofit; Avtalion	
1988					Kmehin; Givat Ela	
1989	Neve Harif; Neot Smadar				Bat Ayin	
1990				Beitar Illit	Avnei Hefetz	
1991			*Tzur Yigal		Eshkolot (Was established in 1982 as a Nahal settlement, a permanent residency in this location began in this year.)	*Populating began in 1994 and was merged in 2003 with Kokhav Ya'ir.
1994				*Modi'in		*Populating began in 1996 and in 2003 was merged with Maccabim and Re'ut.
1996					Tzukim; Bat Hefer	
1998	Eshbal (The village was established in 1979 as a Nahal settlement, a permanent residency in this location began in this year.)				Ahuzat Barak	
2004					Giv'ot Bar	
2005					Nitzan	Israel's unilateral disengagement plan: Gush Katif and a number of settlements in the north of Samaria were evicted
2011					Irus	

== See also ==
- Israeli settlement timeline
- History of the Jews in the Land of Israel
- Yom HaAliyah
