= Nir Akiva =

Moshav in southern Israel

Nir Akiva: ניר עקיבא (Hebrew)
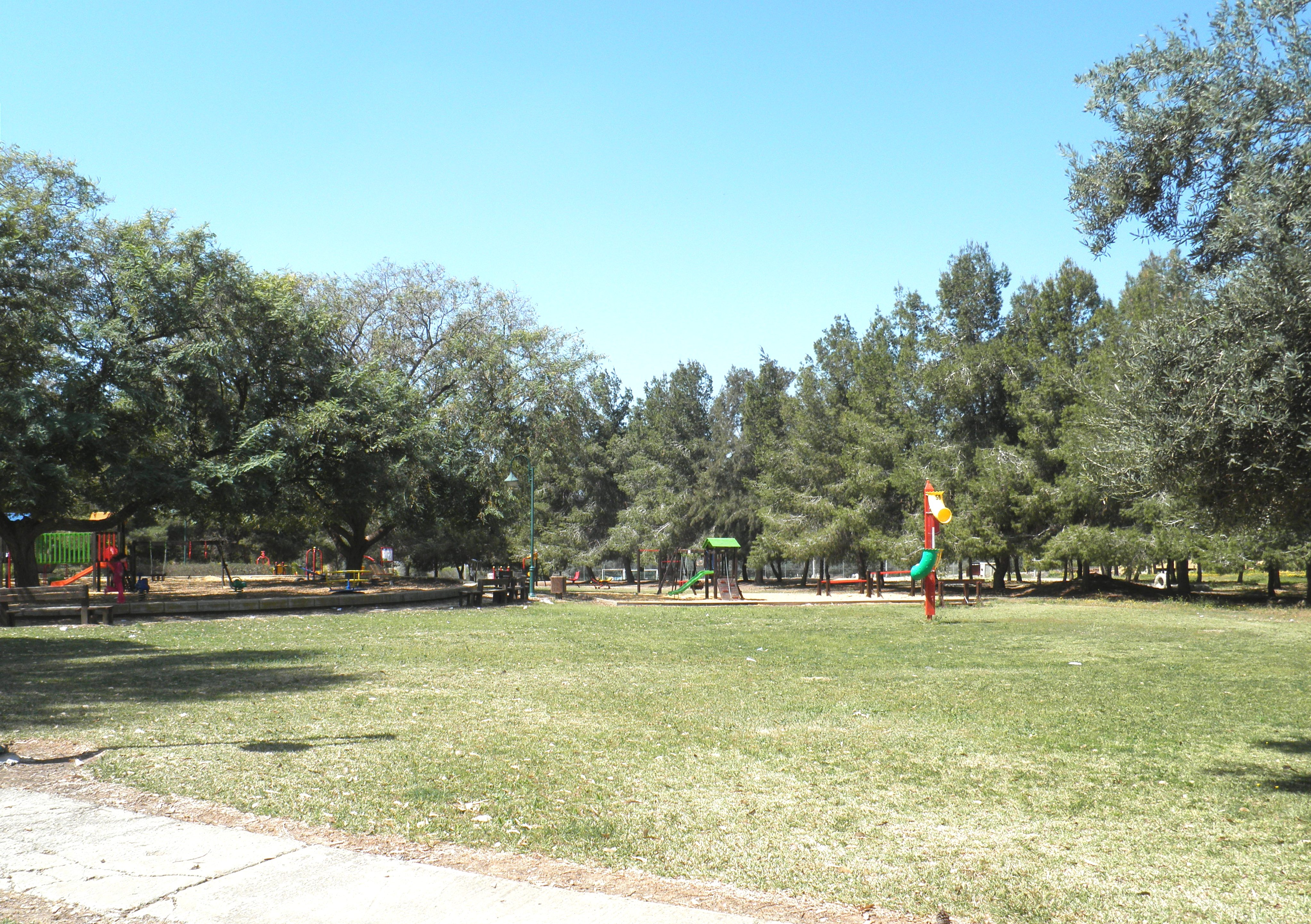
- Etymology: Akiva's Meadow
- Location within Northwest Negev region of Israel Location within Israel
- Coordinates: 31°28′12″N 34°38′48″E
- Country: Israel
- District: Southern
- Subdistrict: Beersheba
- Council: Merhavim
- Affiliation: Moshavim Movement
- Founded: 1953
- Population (2024): 728

Nir Akiva (Hebrew: ניר עקיבא, lit. 'Akiva's Meadow') is a moshav in southern Israel. Located in the north-western Negev desert near Netivot and Nir Moshe and covering 1,000 dunams, it falls under the jurisdiction of Merhavim Regional Council. In 2024 it had a population of 728.

== History ==
The moshav was established in 1953, on the lands of the Palestinian village of Kawfakha that was depopulated in 1948. It was named after Akiva Etinger, a chief of the Settlement Department in the Jewish Agency. In the late 1970s Amir Peretz was a member of the moshav, bought a farm in the village and grew vegetables and flowers for export.
