= Klahim =

Moshav in southern Israel

Klahim: קלחים (Hebrew)
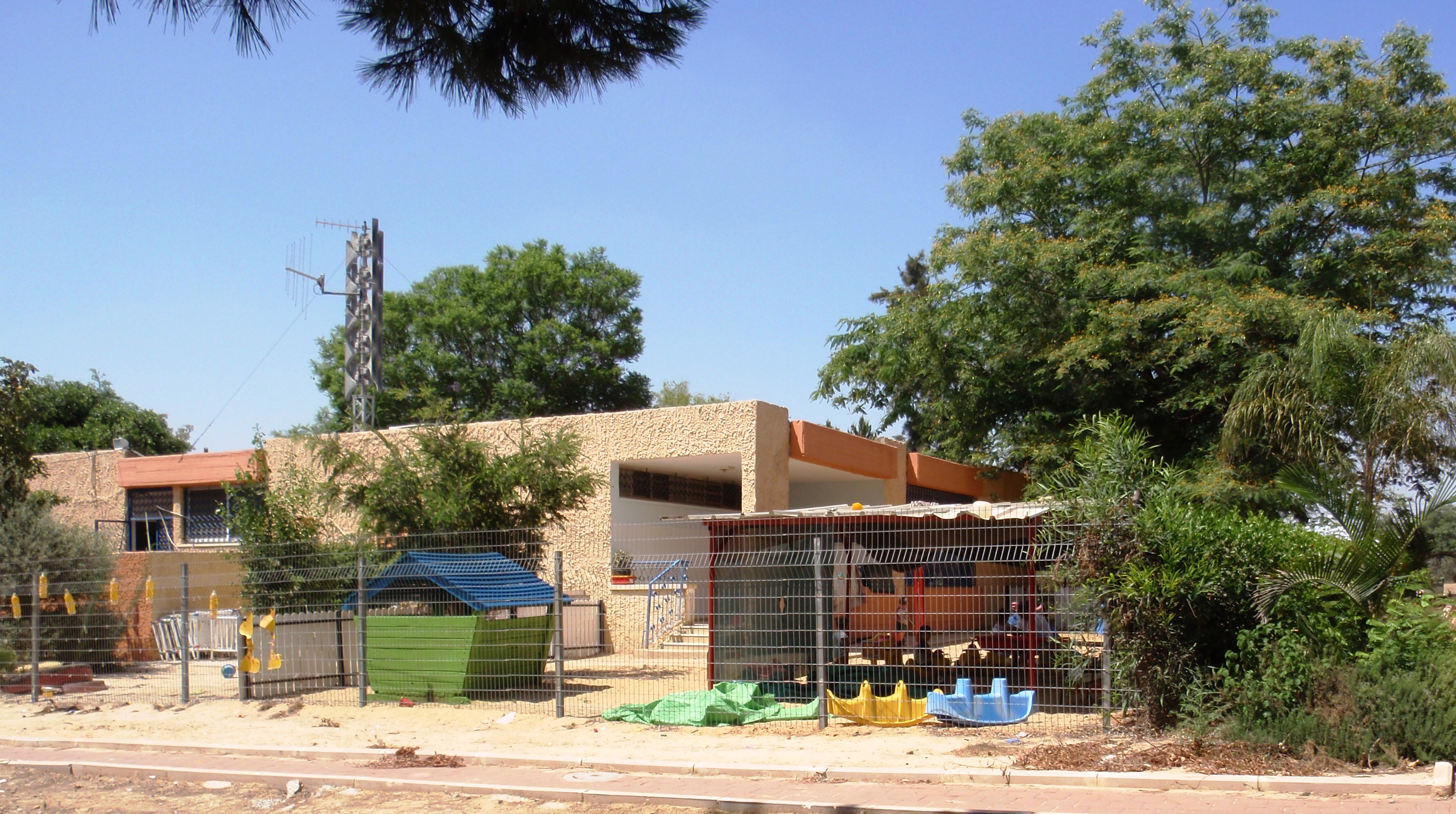
- Etymology: Corncobs
- Location within Northwest Negev region of Israel Location within Israel
- Coordinates: 31°26′46″N 34°40′40″E
- Country: Israel
- District: Southern
- Subdistrict: Beersheba
- Council: Merhavim
- Affiliation: Agricultural Union
- Founded: 1954
- Founder: Moroccan, Persian and Tunisian Jews
- Population (2024): 648

Klahim (Hebrew: קלחים, lit. 'Corncobs') is a moshav in southern Israel. Located in the north-western Negev desert near Netivot, it falls under the jurisdiction of Merhavim Regional Council. In 2024 it had a population of 648.

== History ==
The moshav was established in 1954 by Jewish immigrants and refugees from Iran, Morocco and Tunisia. It was initially called Shoval Daled and then Shadma, before adopting its current name.
