= Merhavim Regional Council =

Coordinates: 31.450°N 34.700°E

Merhavim מועצה אזורית מרחבים مجلس اقليمي مرحافيم
- Regional council (from 1951)
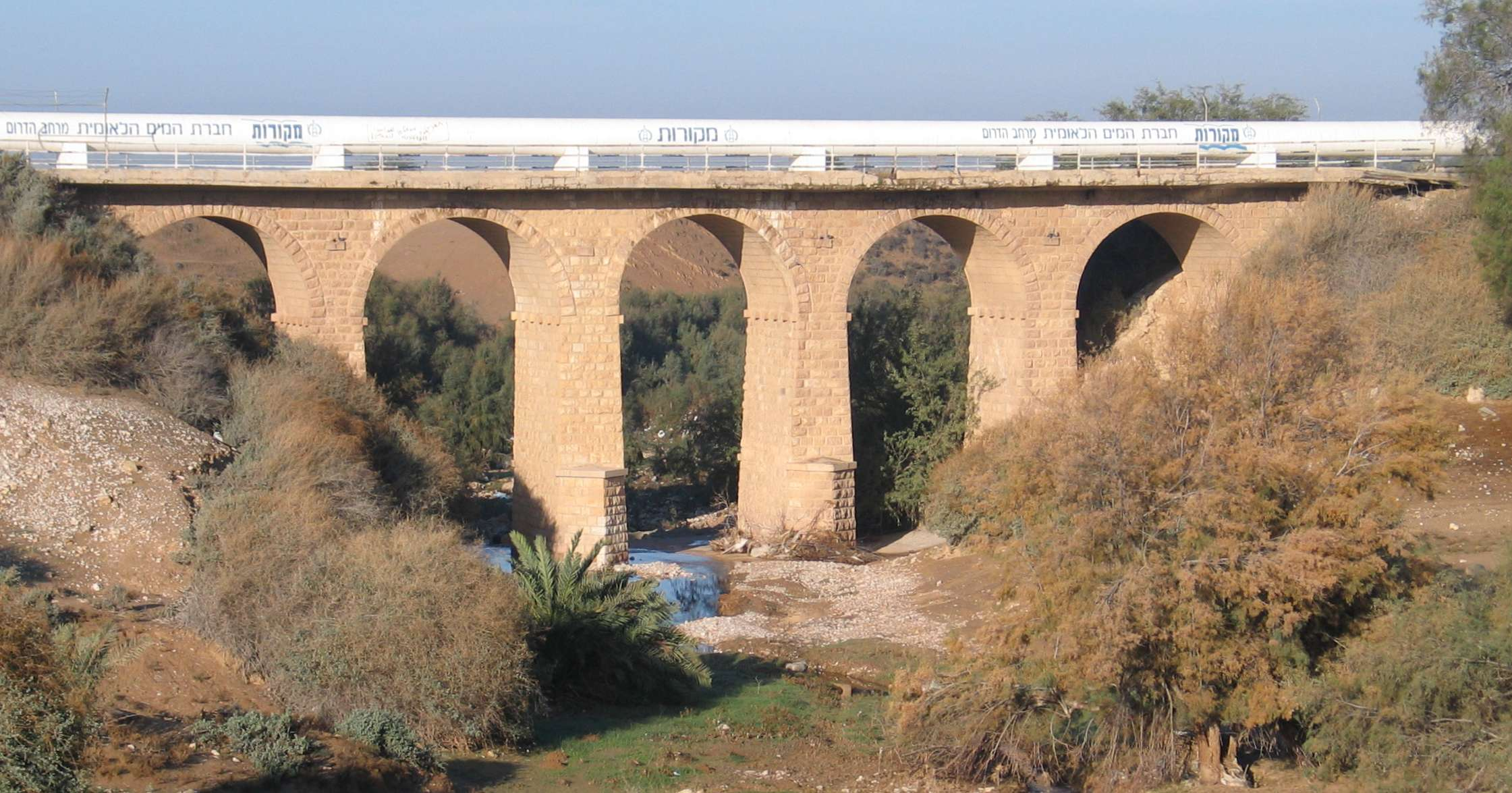

- Interactive map of Merhavim
- Country: Israel
- District: Southern
- Subdistrict: Beersheba
- Natural region: Besor, Gerar

Government
  - Head of Municipality: Shay Hajaj

Area
  - Total: 500,970 dunams (500.97 km^{2}; 193.43 sq mi)

Population (2024)
  - Total: 15,373
  - Density: 30.686/km^{2} (79.478/sq mi)
- Website: Official website

Merhavim Regional Council (Hebrew: מועצה אזורית מרחבים, Mo'atza Azorit Merhavim) is a regional council in the Southern District of Israel. It covers 14 moshavim, a community settlement, a youth village and an educational institution.

== List of communities ==
Moshavim

- Bitha
- Eshbol
- Gilat
- Klahim
- Maslul
- Nir Akiva
- Nir Moshe
- Pa'amei Tashaz
- Patish
- Peduim
- Ranen
- Sde Tzvi
- Talmei Bilu
- Tifrah

Community settlement

- Mabu'im
- Shavei Darom

Youth village

- Eshel HaNasi

Other village (educational institution)

- Adi Negev

== Demographics ==
Historical population
Year	Pop.	±%
1972	5,100	—
1983	5,400	+5.9%
1995	6,200	+14.8%
2008	10,060	+62.3%
2022	14,545	+44.6%
2024	15,373	+5.7%

== Voting Patterns ==
In the 2022 election, 77 percent of voters in the regional council voted for the parties of the right-wing coalition led by Benjamin Netanyahu, while 23 percent voted for the parties of the center-left coalition led by Yair Lapid and 0.1 percent voted for the Arab parties.

In the 2026 election, 70 percent of voters in the regional council voted for the parties of the right-wing coalition led by Benjamin Netanyahu, while 22 percent voted for the parties of the center-left coalition led by Gadi Eisenkot and 0.1 percent voted for the Arab parties. An additional 4.1 percent voted for the Reservists, and 2.4 percent voted for Amcha Yisrael. Voter turnout increased 10 percent from the 2022 election.
