= Tifrah =

Tifrah: תפרח (Hebrew)
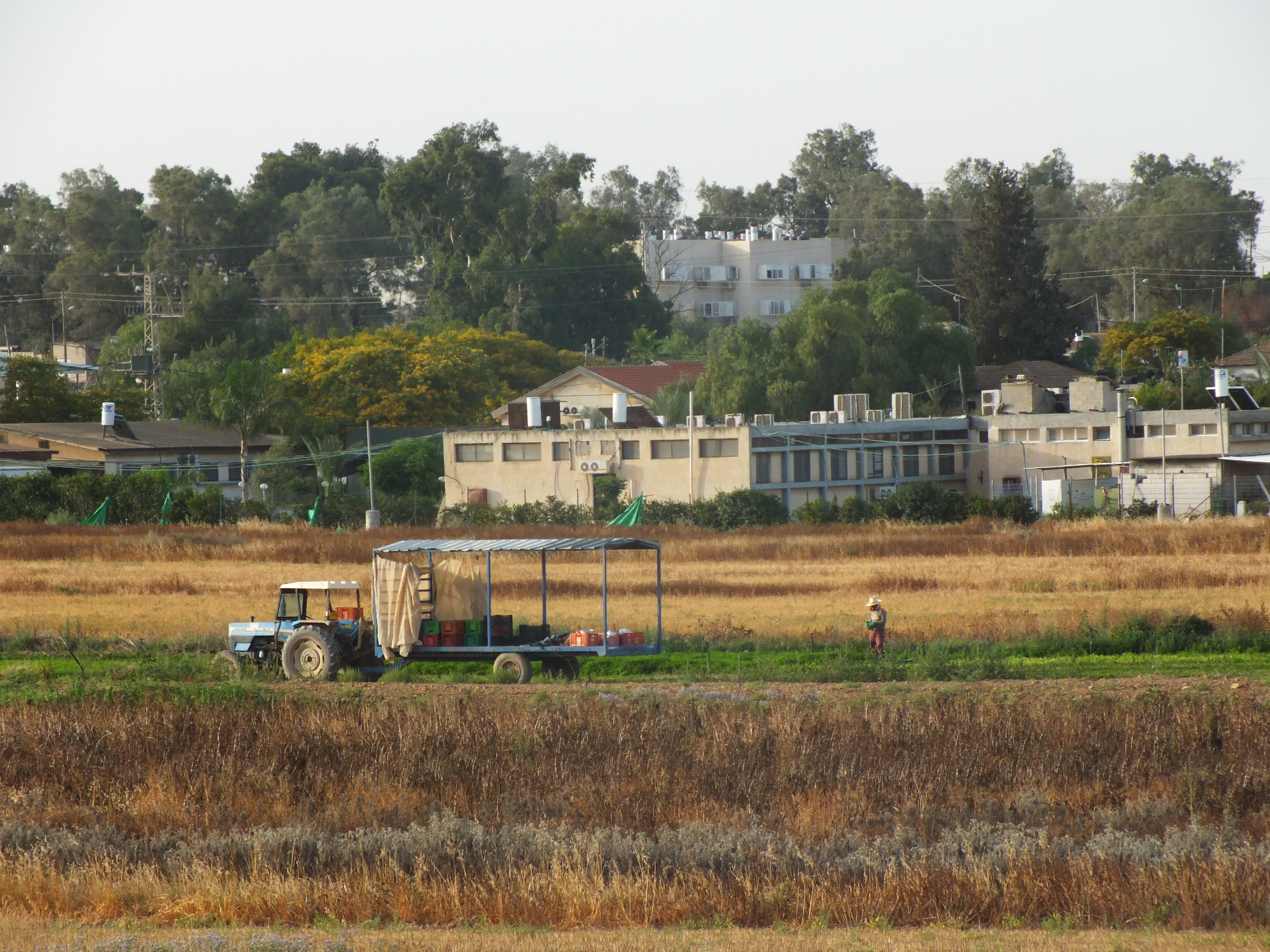
- Etymology: (She) shall blossom
- Location within Northwest Negev region of Israel Location within Israel
- Coordinates: 31°19′35″N 34°40′36″E
- Country: Israel
- District: Southern
- Subdistrict: Beersheba
- Council: Merhavim
- Affiliation: Poalei Agudat Yisrael
- Founded: 1950
- Founder: Hungarian and North African Jews
- Population (2024): 2,307

Tifrah (Hebrew: תפרח, lit. '[She] shall blossom') is a religious moshav in southern Israel. Located in the north-western Negev desert to the west of Eshel HaNasi with an area of 5,000 dunams, it falls under the jurisdiction of Merhavim Regional Council. In 2024 it had a population of 2,307.

== History ==
The moshav was established in 1950 by Jewish immigrants from Hungary, Czechoslovakia, Transylvania and North Africa. Like the names of two other moshavim (Gilat, Ranen) in the area, its name is taken from the Book of Isaiah 35:2:

(The wilderness and the parched land, (35:1)) it shall blossom abundantly, and rejoice, even with joy and singing.
