= Shavei Darom =

Place in Southern District, Israel

Shavei Darom: שבי דרום (Hebrew)
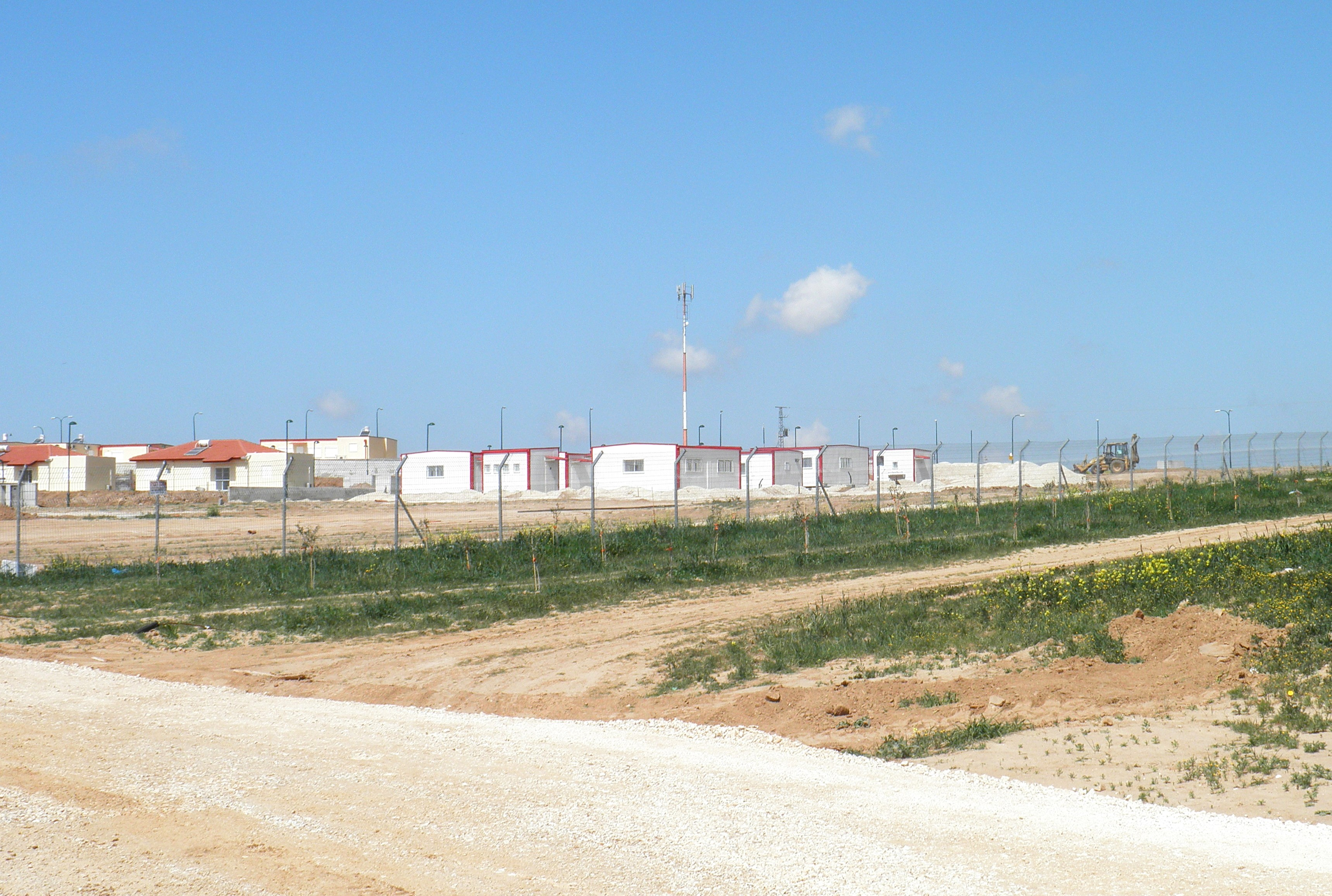
- Etymology: Returnees to the South
- Location within Ashkelon region of Israel Location within Israel
- Coordinates: 31°27′57″N 34°38′19″E
- Country: Israel
- District: Southern
- Subdistrict: Beersheba
- Council: Merhavim
- Founded: 2010
- Population (2024): 707
- Website: shaveidarom.org.il

Shavei Darom (Hebrew: שבי דרום, lit. 'Returnees to the South') is a community settlement in southern Israel. Located to the south-east of Sderot, it falls under the jurisdiction of Merhavim Regional Council. In 2024 it had a population of 707.

== History ==
The village was built to rehouse former residents of Kfar Darom, an Israeli settlement in the Gaza Strip that was evacuated as part of the Gaza disengagement in 2005. Its construction was approved by the government in December 2009, with the former settlers having lived in Ashkelon following their removal from Gaza. The new residents arrived in 2010, initially living in caravans.
