= Galil Jewish–Arab School =

Primary school in Israel

- בית ספר גליל – דו לשוני مدرسة الجليل – ثنائية اللغة
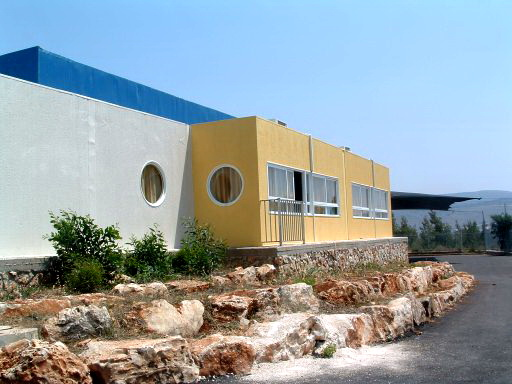
- The school in 2007
- Eshbal, Northern District; Galilee; Israel

Information
- Religious affiliations: Judaism, Christianity, Islam
- Established: 1998
- Grades: 1–6
- Enrollment: c. 240
- Language: Hebrew and Arabic
- Website: yad.sisma.org.il/school/galil/Pages/Default.aspx

The Galil Jewish–Arab School is a primary school in Israel. Founded in 1998, it is the first Israeli school to have a dedicated joint Jewish–Arab social structure. The school is located in Eshbal, a kibbutz in the Misgav region of the Galilee near the Arab-majority city of Sakhnin in the Northern District.

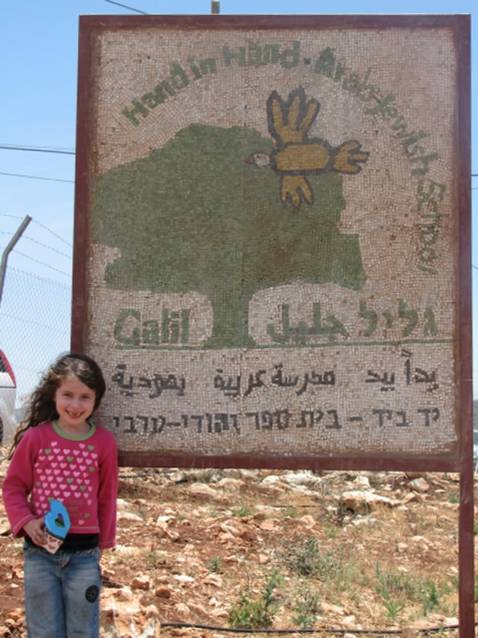
A child standing next to the front sign of the school (October 2009)

== History ==
The Galil Jewish–Arab School was established in 1998 by Hand in Hand: Center for Jewish–Arab Education in Israel, an Israeli network for socially-integrated bilingual schools. In 2007, the school had a student body of 200 Jewish and Arab students (Jews, Muslims and Christians) in grades 1 through 6. The school's students live in Sakhnin, Sha’ab, and communities of the Misgav Regional Council, whose populations have expressed support for bilingual and multicultural education.

== Educational model ==
In line with the multiculturalist objectives of Hand in Hand, the Galil Jewish–Arab School maintains an equal number of Arab and Jewish students; each class has two teachers, one Arab and one Jewish, the school has two co-principals, also split between Arab and Jewish.

Hand in Hand's approach to bilingual education aims to create equality, understanding, and coexistence between the Arab and Jewish populations of Israel, who often live segregated from one another due to the historical effects of the ongoing Israeli–Palestinian conflict. Classes at Hand in Hand schools are co-taught by an Arab and Jewish teacher, and consequently integrate student learning in both Arabic and Hebrew. Teachers do not actively translate, providing a strong incentive for students to attain fluency in their non-native language.

== See also ==
- Arab–Israeli peace projects
- Arab–Israeli conflict
  - Israeli–Palestinian conflict
