= Kawfakha =

Kawfakha كوفخة Kaufakha
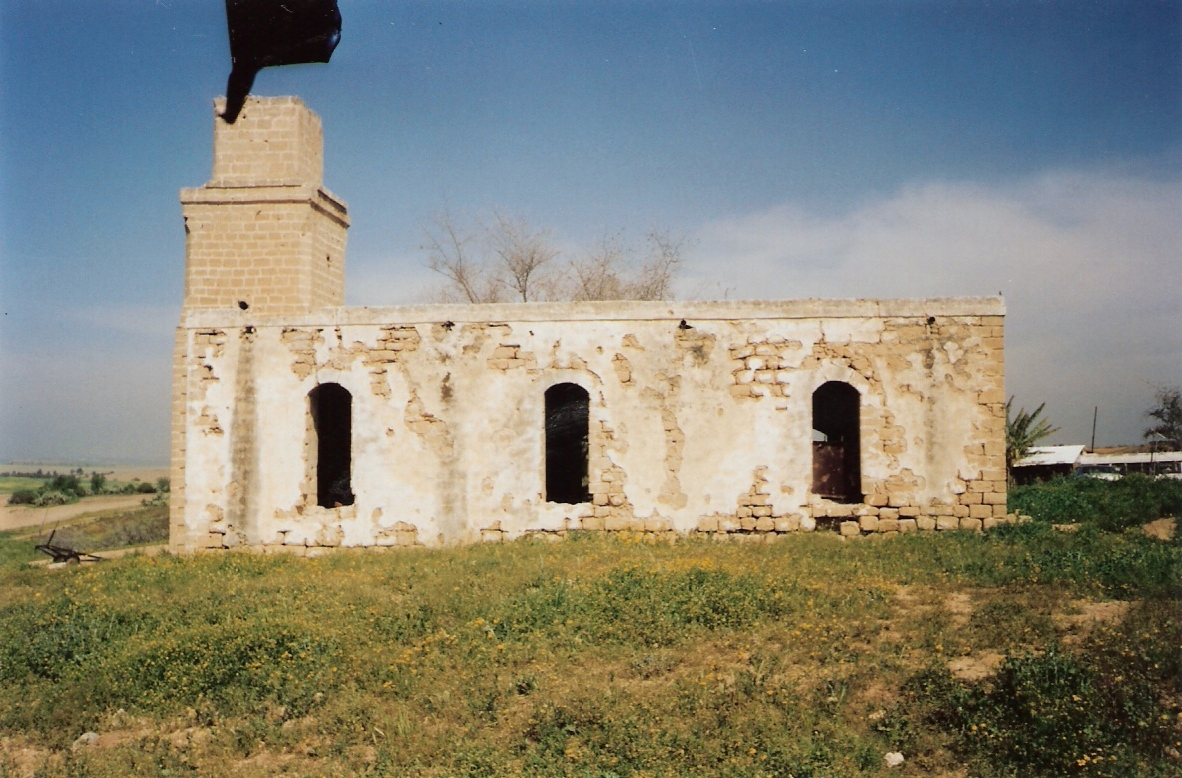
- Old mosque of Kawfakha, in 2000, presently used as a storehouse

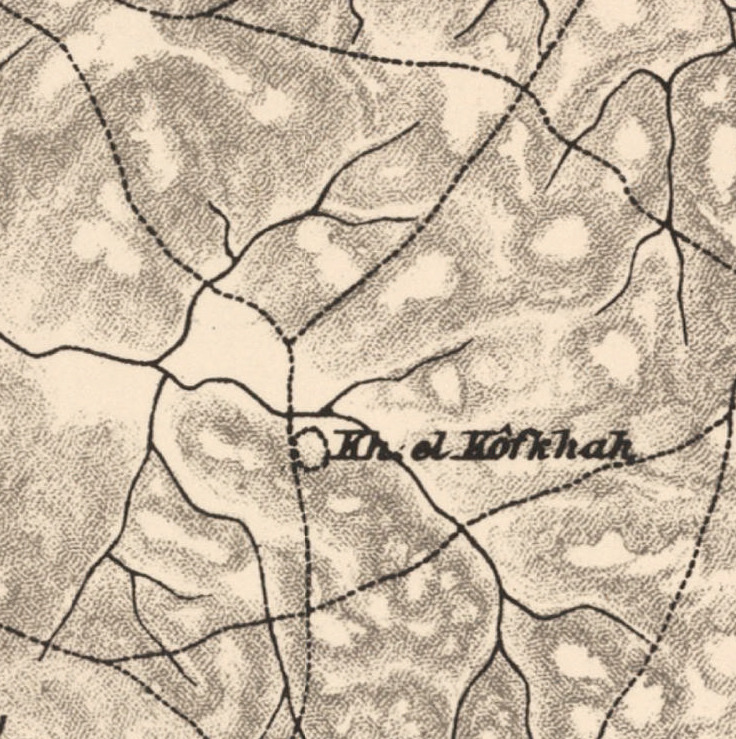
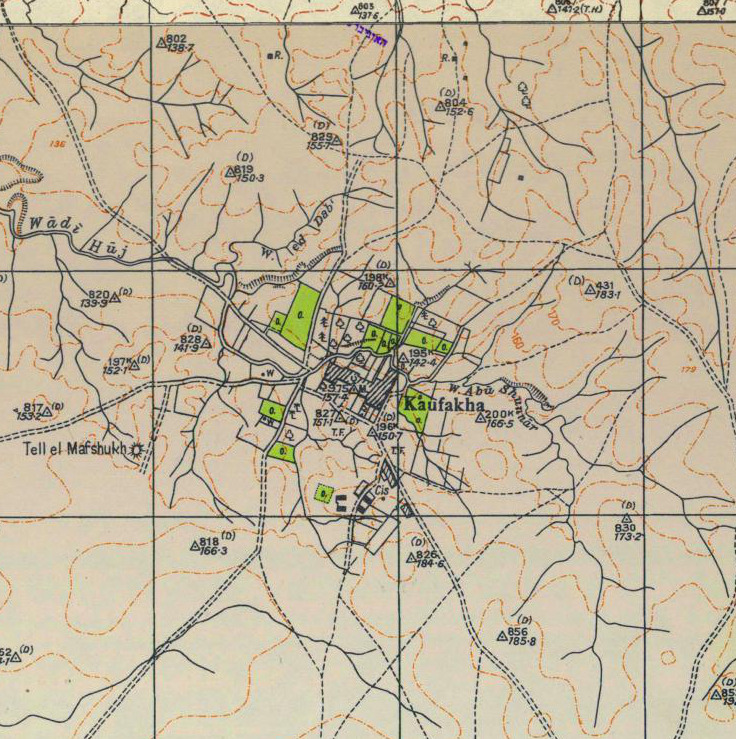
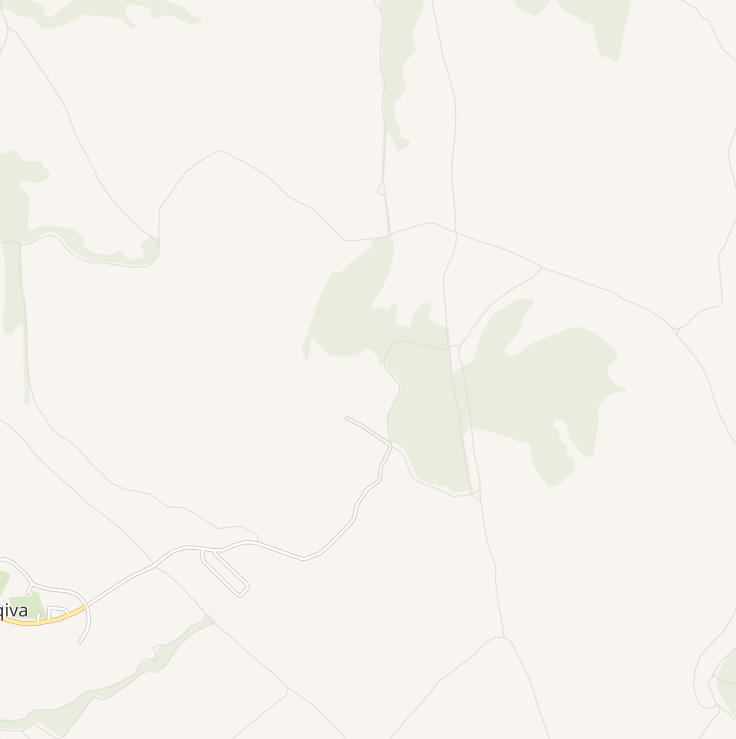
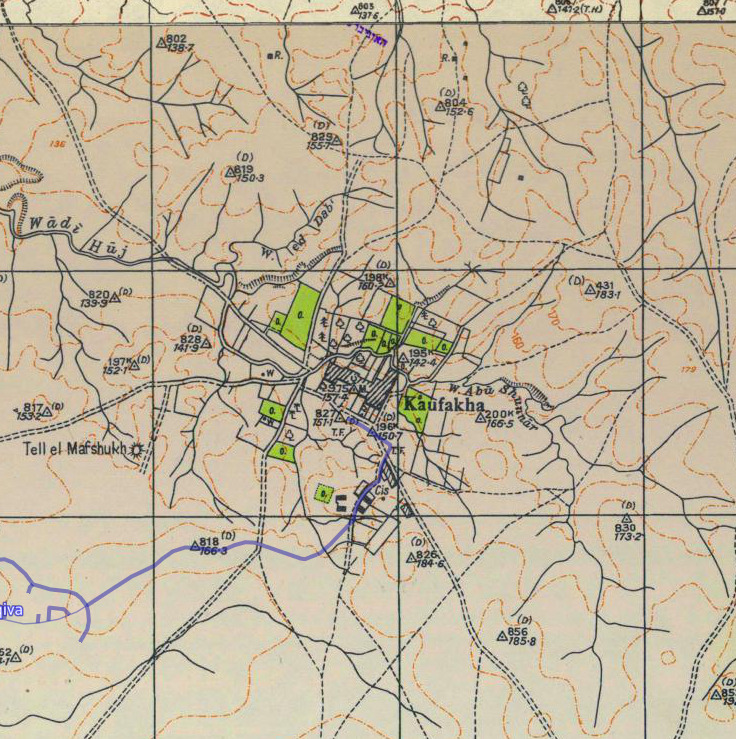
- 1870s map 1940s map modern map 1940s with modern overlay map A series of historical maps of the area around Kawfakha (click the buttons)

- Location within Mandatory Palestine
- Coordinates: 31°28′42″N 34°39′42″E
- Palestine grid: 117/098
- Geopolitical entity: Mandatory Palestine
- Subdistrict: Gaza
- Date of depopulation: May 25, 1948

Area
  - Total: 8,569 dunams (8.569 km^{2}; 3.309 sq mi)

Population (1945)
  - Total: 500
- Cause(s) of depopulation: Military assault by Yishuv forces
- Current Localities: Nir Akiva

Kawfakha' (Arabic: كوفخة), also pronounced as al-Kofakha, was a Palestinian village located 18 kilometers (11 mi) east of Gaza that was depopulated during the 1948 Arab-Israeli war.

== Location ==
The village stood on a stretch of sandy, rolling land in the northern Negev. A network of secondary roads linked it to the highways between Gaza and Julis, which ran parallel to the coastal highway.

== History ==
Ceramics from the Byzantine era have been found here.

Kawfakha was inhabited in the 15th century. In 1472–1473 CE, Sultan Qaitbay endowed it for the benefit of his Jerusalem madrasa.

=== Ottoman era ===
In 1838, in the Late Ottoman era, el-Kaufakhah was noted as a place "in ruins or deserted."

In 1882, the PEF's Survey of Western Palestine (SWP) noted at Khurbet el Kofkhah: "a large site. Rubble cisterns, a marble capital, with acanthus leaves. Scattered stones and pottery."

Kawfakwa was founded in the late nineteenth century by Gaza city residents who came to cultivate the surrounding land. In its center was a mosque that was well known in the region, built in the reign of the Ottoman sultan Abd al-Hamid II (1876–1909).

=== British mandate era ===
In the 1922 census of Palestine, conducted by the British Mandate authorities, Kufakha had a population of 203 Muslims, increasing in the 1931 census to 317, still all Muslims, in 56 houses.

The village had an elementary school and some small shops. The villagers obtained water for domestic use from two wells inside the village. The land on the northern side of the village was planted with fruit trees, such as apricots, olives, almonds, grapes and figs. On the other sides of the village grain was grown.

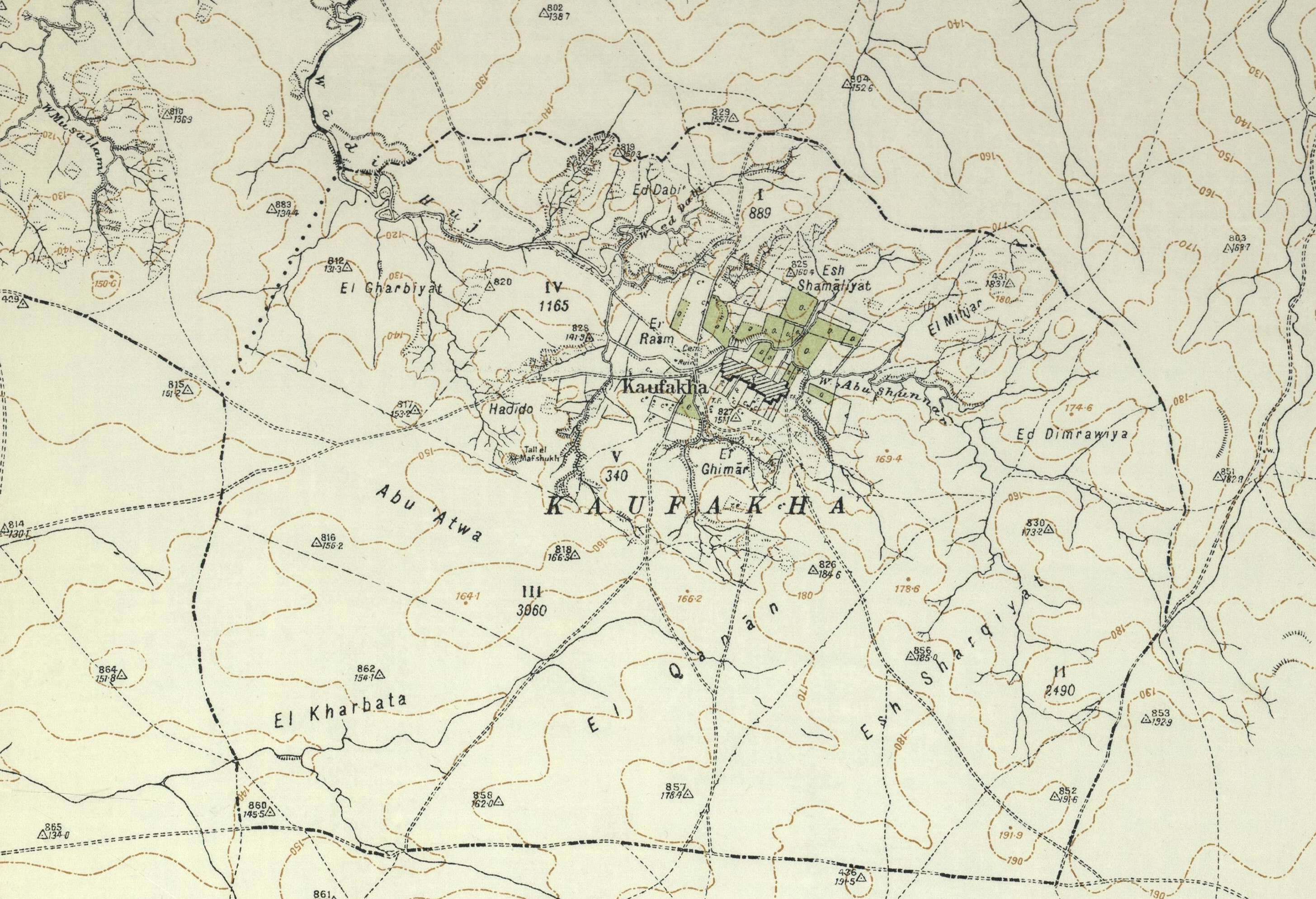
Kaufakha 1931 1:20,000

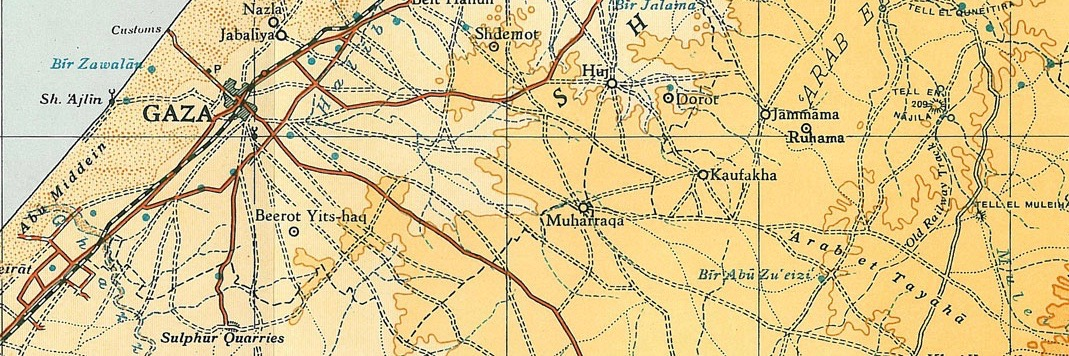
Kaufakha 1945 1:250,000

In the 1945 statistics Kawfakha had a population of 500 Muslims, with a total of 8,569 dunams of land, according to an official land and population survey. Of this, a total of 97 dunums was irrigated or used for orchards, and 7,768 dunums (of public land) were allotted to cereals, while 41 dunams were built-up, public land.

=== 1948 and after ===
During the 1948 Arab-Israeli War, the villagers of Kawfakha repeatedly asked to surrender, accept Jewish rule and be allowed to stay, all to no avail. Kawfakha, together with al-Muharraqa, was raided by the Palmach's Negev Brigade on May 27–28, and the inhabitants of both villages were expelled or driven out. On May 30, a New York Times correspondent reported that the two villages had been captured.

Following the war the area was incorporated into the State of Israel and the moshav of Nir Akiva was established in 1953 on village lands, southwest of the village site.

According to Khalidi, by 1992 the village remaining structures on the village land were:

"Only the mosque remains, and it is used as a storehouse for animal fodder and as a horse stable. It is a stone structure with arched entrances and windows on all sides; its roof is topped by three shallow domes. The site, which contains piles of rubble and is overgrown with cactuses and other desert plants, has been fenced in and serves as a pasture. There is a citrus grove west of it, and grain is grown by Israeli farmers on part of the surrounding land."

The village mosque was inspected in 1994, and found to be built of ashlar stones (approximately 0.2m x 0.4 m) with the corners emphasized by a slight offset. At the north-west corner there was a thick square minaret 10–15 meters high. There are three doorways on the north side, two of which lead into the prayer hall, whilst the east door leads into a separate room. At the time of the inspection, the mosque was used as a storehouse for a nearby farm ("Avi´s Ranch").

== See also ==
- Depopulated Palestinian locations in Israel

== Bibliography ==
- Barron, J.B., ed. (1923). Palestine: Report and General Abstracts of the Census of 1922. Government of Palestine.
- Conder, C.R.; Kitchener, H.H. (1883). The Survey of Western Palestine: Memoirs of the Topography, Orography, Hydrography, and Archaeology. Vol. 3. London: Committee of the Palestine Exploration Fund.
- Dauphin, C. (1998). La Palestine byzantine, Peuplement et Populations. BAR International Series 726 (in French). Vol. III : Catalogue. Oxford: Archeopress. ISBN 0-860549-05-4.
- Government of Palestine, Department of Statistics (1945). Village Statistics, April, 1945.
- Hadawi, S. (1970). "Village Statistics of 1945: A Classification of Land and Area ownership in Palestine". Palestine Liberation Organization Research Center.
- Khalidi, W. (1992). All That Remains: The Palestinian Villages Occupied and Depopulated by Israel in 1948. Washington D.C.: Institute for Palestine Studies. ISBN 0-88728-224-5.
- Mills, E., ed. (1932). Census of Palestine 1931. Population of Villages, Towns and Administrative Areas. Jerusalem: Government of Palestine.
- Morris, B. (2004). The Birth of the Palestinian Refugee Problem Revisited. Cambridge University Press. ISBN 978-0-521-00967-6.
- Palmer, E.H. (1881). The Survey of Western Palestine: Arabic and English Name Lists Collected During the Survey by Lieutenants Conder and Kitchener, R. E. Transliterated and Explained by E.H. Palmer. Committee of the Palestine Exploration Fund.
- Petersen, Andrew (2001). A Gazetteer of Buildings in Muslim Palestine (British Academy Monographs in Archaeology). Vol. 1. Oxford University Press. ISBN 978-0-19-727011-0.
- Robinson, E.; Smith, E. (1841). Biblical Researches in Palestine, Mount Sinai and Arabia Petraea: A Journal of Travels in the year 1838. Vol. 3. Boston: Crocker & Brewster.
