= Nir Moshe =

Moshav in southern Israel

Nir Moshe: ניר משה (Hebrew)
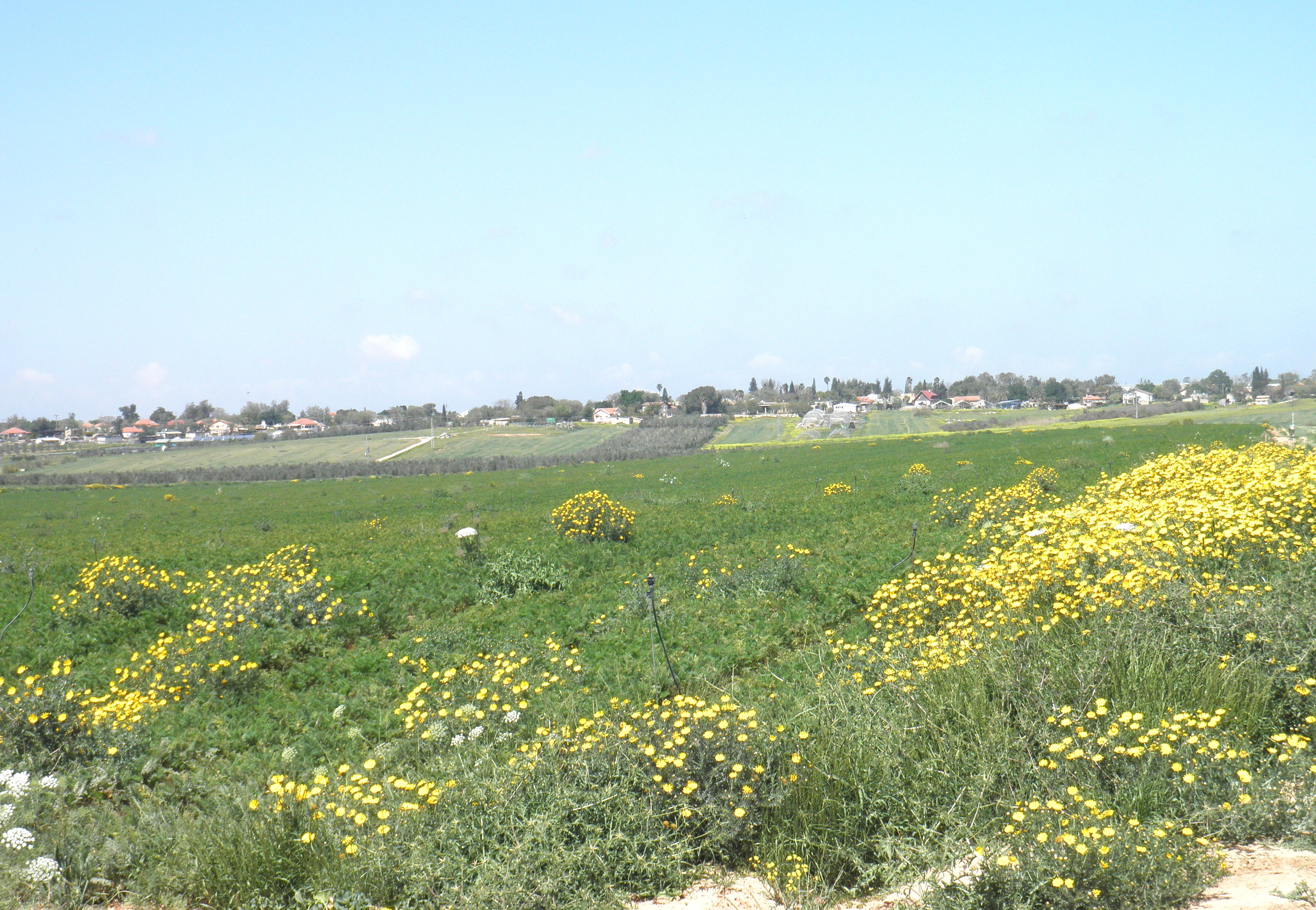
- Etymology: Moshe's Meadow
- Location within Northwest Negev region of Israel Location within Israel
- Coordinates: 31°28′40″N 34°37′52″E
- Country: Israel
- District: Southern
- Subdistrict: Beersheba
- Council: Merhavim
- Affiliation: Moshavim Movement
- Founded: 1953
- Founder: City-dwellers
- Population (2024): 518
- Website: www.nir-moshe.co.il

Nir Moshe (Hebrew: ניר משה, lit. 'Moshe's Meadow') is a moshav in southern Israel with an elevation of 145 m from sea level. Located in the north-western Negev desert, south-east of Sderot with an area of 2,000 dunams, it falls under the jurisdiction of Merhavim Regional Council. In 2024 it had a population of 518.

== History ==
The moshav was established in 1953 by former city dwellers from Jerusalem, Haifa and Herzliya. It was initially named Shoval Mizrachi 1, before being renamed after Moshe Smiliansky, an author and agronomist.
