= Eshkolot =

Israeli settlement in the West Bank

Eshkolot: אשכולות (Hebrew)
- Community settlement
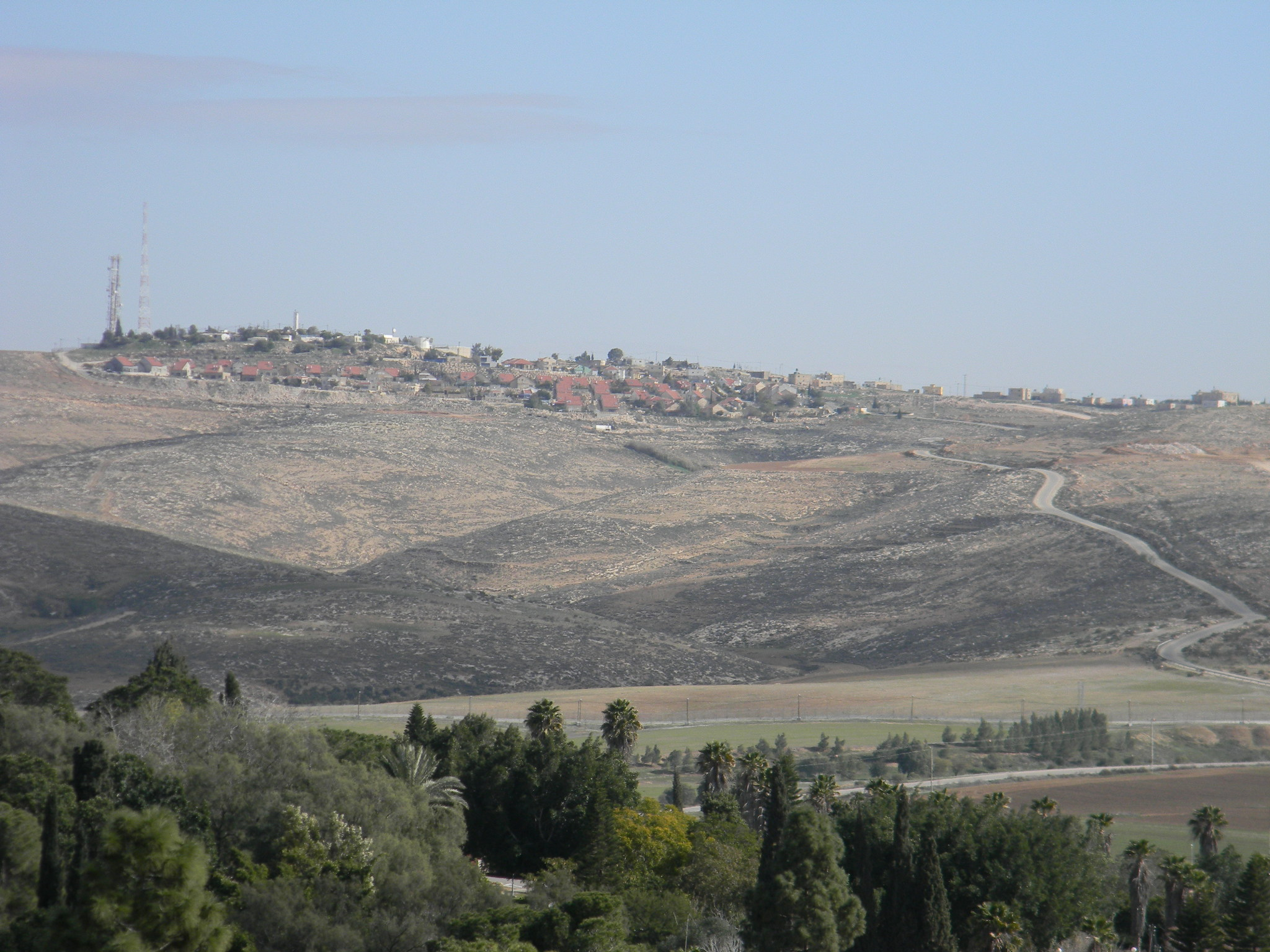

- Location within the Southern West Bank
- Coordinates: 31°23′27″N 34°54′17″E
- Country: Israel
- District: Judea and Samaria Area
- Council: Har Hevron
- Region: West Bank
- Affiliation: Amana
- Founded: 1982
- Founder: Nahal
- Population (2024): 646

Eshkolot (Hebrew: אשכולות, lit. 'Bunches') is a secular Israeli settlement in the southern Judaean Mountains of the West Bank. Located around five kilometers from Lahav, it is organized as a community settlement and falls within the jurisdiction of the Har Hevron Regional Council. In 2024 it had a population of 646.

The international community considers Israeli settlements in the West Bank illegal under international law, but the Israeli government disputes this.

== History ==
The village was first established in 1982 as a Nahal settlement and was turned over to civilians in 1991. The name of the city is taken from the well-known vineyards in Hebron.

Some of its residents own lands and are farming wheat, barley, grapes, olives, figs and pomegranates and even some few dates while others are working in other places, in particular Beersheba.

== See also ==
- Eshkolot (Jewish Studies book series)
