= Ranen =

Ranen: רנן (Hebrew)
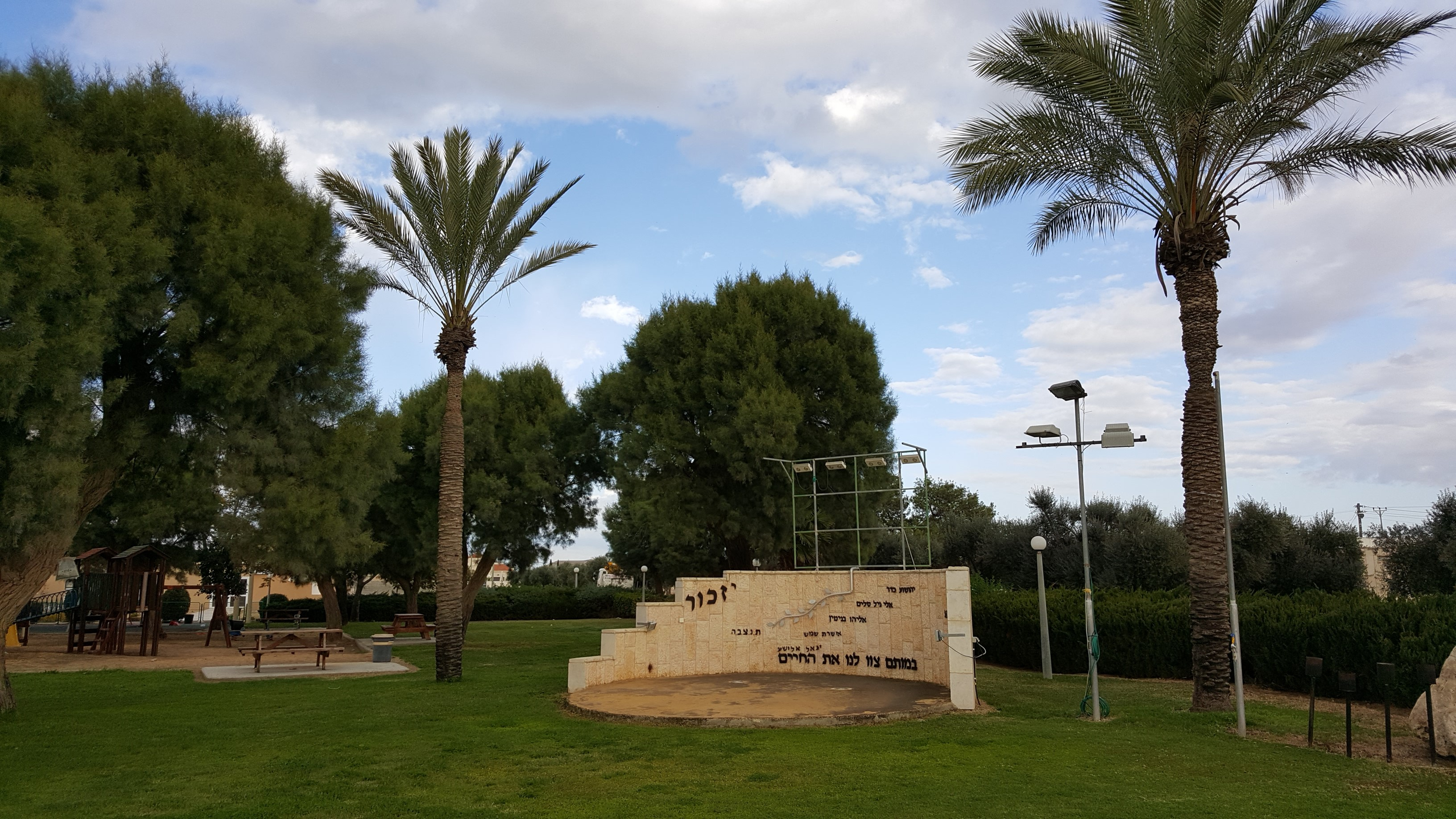
- Etymology: Singing
- Location within Northwest Negev region of Israel Location within Israel
- Coordinates: 31°20′17″N 34°36′4″E
- Country: Israel
- District: Southern
- Subdistrict: Beersheba
- Council: Merhavim
- Affiliation: Moshavim Movement
- Founded: 1950
- Founder: Yemenite immigrants
- Population (2024): 785

Ranen (Hebrew: רנן, lit. 'Singing') is a moshav in southern Israel. Located in the north-western Negev desert, two kilometres north of Ofakim, it falls under the jurisdiction of Merhavim Regional Council. In 2024 it had a population of 785.

== History ==
The moshav was established in 1950 by immigrants from Yemen and was originally named Bitkha. In 1952 the residents moved to the site of the Hakam Ha-107 ma'abara and converted it to a moshav, taking the name Bitkha.

A group of Karaite Jews from Egypt moved onto the moshav, renaming it Ranen, which like the names of two other moshavim (Tifrah, Gilat) in the area, is taken from the Book of Isaiah 35:2,

(The desert,) it shall blossom abundantly, and rejoice, even with joy and singing; the glory of Lebanon shall be given unto it, the excellency of Carmel and Sharon; they shall see the glory of the Lord, the excellency of our God.
