= Elazar Granot =

Israeli politician and writer

- אלעזר גרנות
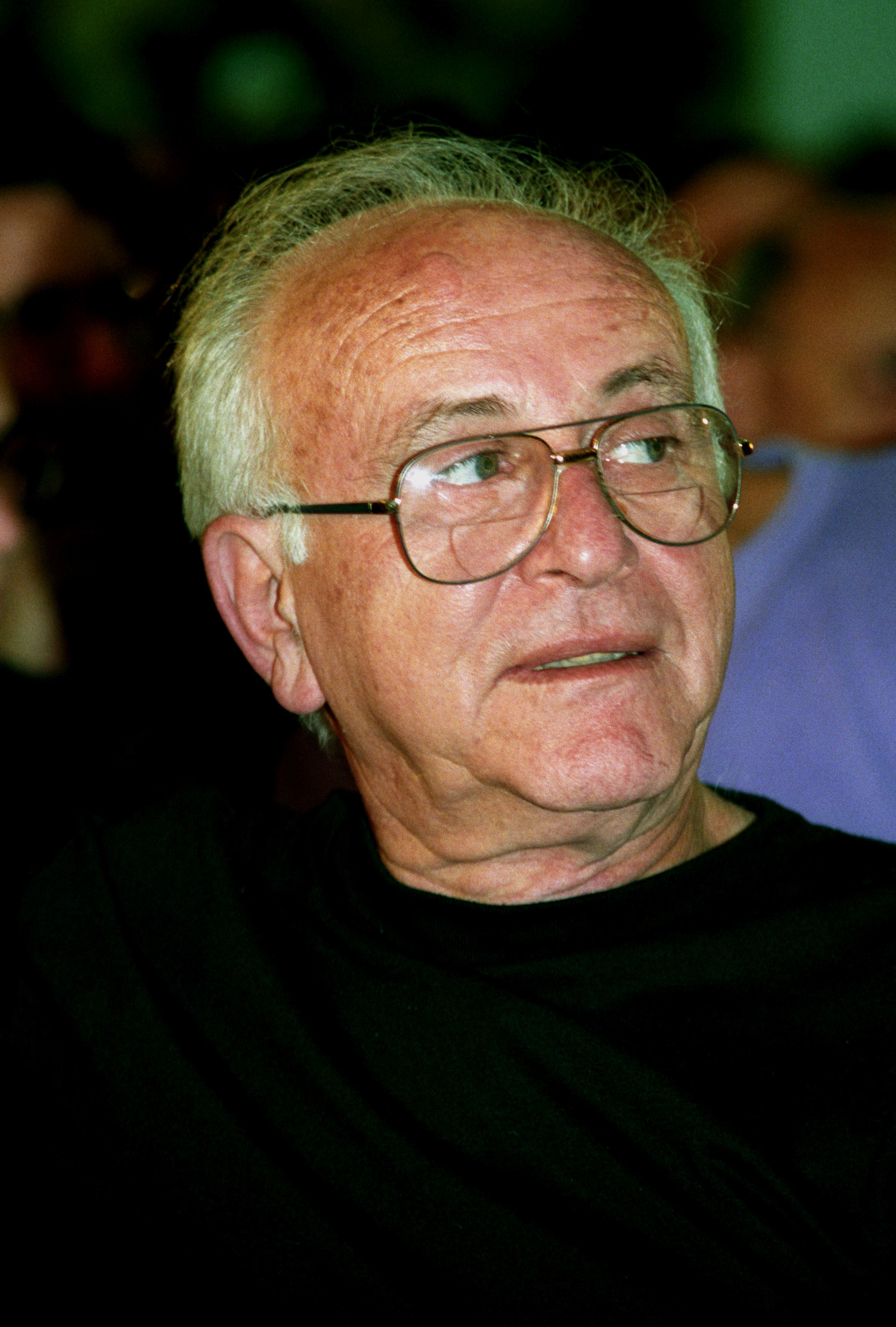

Faction represented in the Knesset
- 1981–1984: Alignment
- 1984–1988: Mapam

Ambassador of Israel to South Africa
- In office 1994–1996

Personal details
- Born: 12 March 1927 Jerusalem, Mandatory Palestine
- Died: 19 September 2013 (aged 86)

Elazar Granot (Hebrew: אלעזר גרנות; 12 March 1927 – 19 September 2013) was an Israeli politician and a writer.

== Biography ==
Born in Jerusalem during the Mandate era, Granot was educated at Pardes Hanna Agricultural High School, before moving onto the Hebrew University of Jerusalem where he studied philosophy, sociology, literature, Hebrew and Bible.

During World War II he enlisted in the British Army and served in the Jewish Brigade between 1944 and 1946, fighting in the Italian campaign. He also fought in the 1948 Arab-Israeli War in the Etzioni Brigade of the Israel Defense Forces. In 1951 he became a member of kibbutz Sasa, where he lived until 1958 when he moved to kibbutz Shoval.

Between 1962 and 1964 he served as director of the Young Leadership of Mapam, becoming the party's organisational secretary in 1975, and political secretary in 1979. In 1981 he was elected to the Knesset on the Alignment's list (Mapam was a faction within the Alignment at the time). He was re-elected in 1984, and was a member of the Foreign Affairs and Defense Committee. Although he became Mapam's secretary general in 1985, Granot lost his seat in the 1988 elections. He was the Israeli ambassador to South Africa from 1994 to 1996. He died in 2013 in kibbutz Shoval.

In 2016 he was accused of being a KGB agent for the Soviet Union in the Mitrokhin Archive.
