= Maslul =

Moshav in southern Israel

Maslul: מסלול (Hebrew)
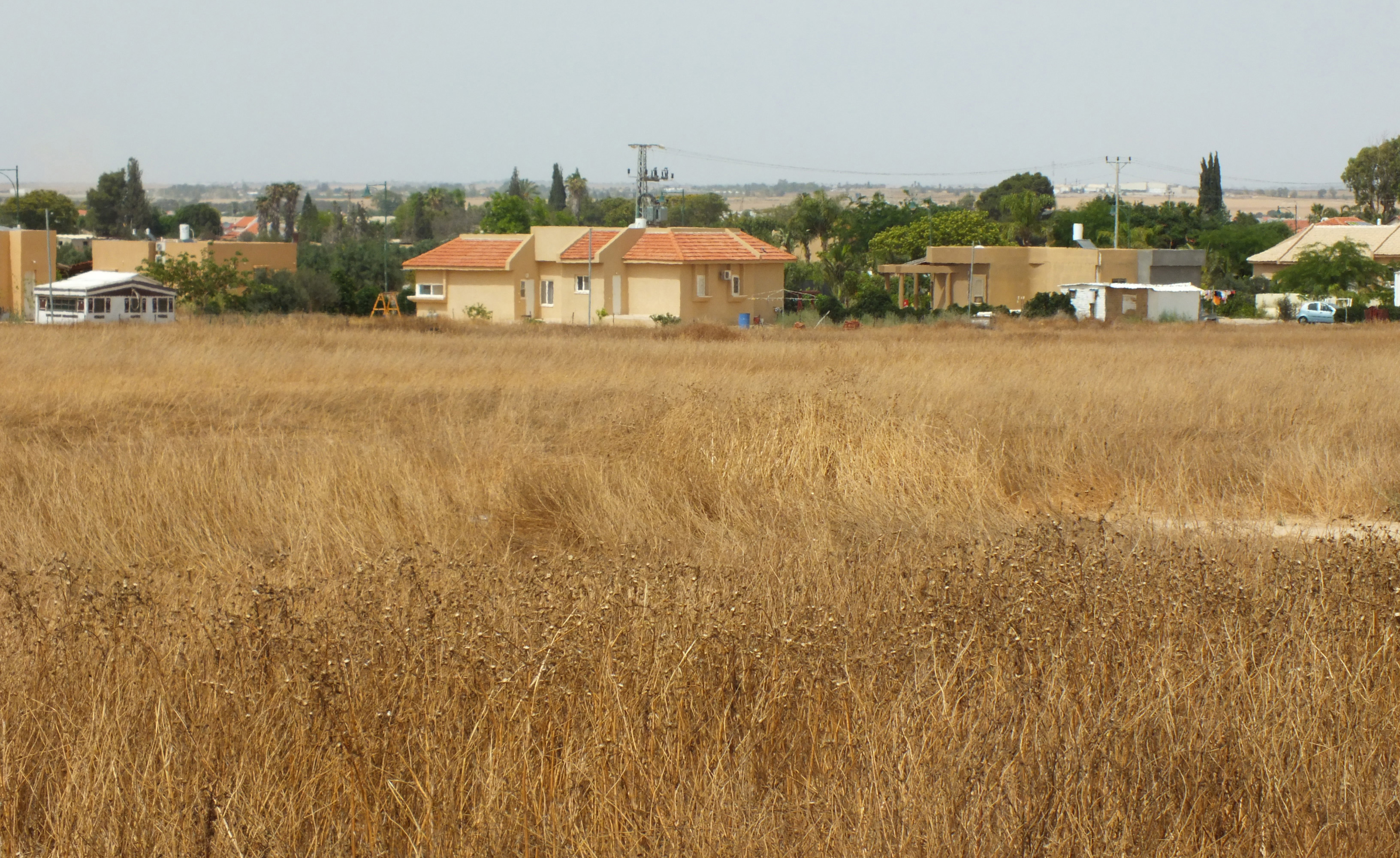
- Etymology: Way
- Location within Northwest Negev region of Israel Location within Israel
- Coordinates: 31°19′27″N 34°35′18″E
- Country: Israel
- District: Southern
- Subdistrict: Beersheba
- Council: Merhavim
- Affiliation: Moshavim Movement
- Founded: 1950
- Founder: Persian Jews
- Population (2024): 993

Maslul (Hebrew: מסלול, lit. 'Way') is a moshav in southern Israel. Located in the north-western Negev desert near Ofakim with an area of 8,000 dunams, it falls under the jurisdiction of Merhavim Regional Council. In 2024 it had a population of 993.

== History ==
The moshav was established in 1950 by immigrants from Iran. Like several other moshavim in the area, its name is taken from the Book of Isaiah 35:8:

And a highway shall be there, and a way, and it shall be called the way of holiness; the unclean shall not pass over it; but it shall be for those; the wayfaring men, yea fools, shall not err therein.
