= Danny Robas =

Israeli pop-rock singer and songwriter (born 1957)

Danny Robas דני רובס

Background information
- Born: 24 December 1957 (age 68)
- Origin: Rehovot, Israel
- Genre: Pop
- Occupation: Musician
- Instrument: Vocals
- Years active: 1983–present

Danny Robas (Hebrew: דני רובס; born 24 December 1957) is an Israeli pop-rock singer-songwriter, composer and musical producer.

== Early life ==
Daniel (Danny) Robas was born in 1957 in Kibbutz Shoval and grew up in Rehovot. His father immigrated to Israel from Morocco and his mother from Egypt. He studied in Smilanski elementary school and then in the Amos de-Shalit high school in Rehovot. In 1973 he joined the Rehovot Municipal Youth Stage as a singer.

He was drafted into the IDF artillery corps and placed in an artillery battalion after finishing his training course. He completed an officer training course and was assigned as an adjutant in the 601st Combat Engineering Battalion. He later served as a commander of an artillery battery and finished his military service at the rank of lieutenant. He was initially placed as an adjutant in his reserve duty, but after several years became a singer and examiner for the military bands.

== Musical career ==
Robas began his musical career as a guitarist, working with singers such as Arik Sinai, Matti Caspi, and Shlomo Artzi. Initially, he wrote songs for other artists – Arik Sinai, Ilanit, Nurit Galron, the musical band Sexta, Vardina Cohen, Harela Ber, Ofira Yosefi, Esti Katz, Pnina Rosenblum and others.

Misgarot (Frames), Robas' debut album in 1983, was arranged and produced by Matti Caspi. All the songs on the album were written and composed by Robas. The album sold poorly at first, but reached gold certification after 25 years, following the success of Robas' next album. The successful songs of this album are "Ani Ba Habaita MeHaLayla" (I'm Coming Home from the Night) and "Davar Lo Kara" (Nothing Happened).

During the 1980s, Robas took part in the radio program Ma Yesh? (What's the Matter?) by Erez Tal and Avri Gilad, playing the part of Jimmy Ohana – a singer singing humorous parodies of well-known Israeli songs (Robas also later appeared in Tal and Gilad's TV show HaOlam HaErev (The World Tonight), as well as in the Israeli Educational TV programs Zehu Ze (That's It) and Roim 6/6 (Eyesight 20/20)). Also during the 1980s his younger brother, Yoav, died of cancer during the Lebanon War, while a soldier, and was the subject of Robas' songs "Makhar Hu Yakhazor" (Tomorrow He Returns) and "Mikhtav Katan" (A Small Letter). Initially, it was difficult for Robas to sing these songs himself, and they were performed by a military band.

Robas' second album, Panim VeShemot (Faces and Names), was released in 1987, during the time he toured as a guitarist with Shlomo Artzi. The album was arranged and produced by Nathan Cohen, and was much more successful, reaching platinum. The popular songs of this album are "Panim VeShemot" (Faces and Names), "Lo Nirdemet Tel-Aviv" (Tel-Aviv Doesn't Sleep), "Ze Lo Ani" (It's Not Me), and "Makhar Hu Yakhazor" (Tomorrow He Returns). Following this album, Robas went on tour with his "band" – Keyboardist Dovi Engler.

His third album, Baderekh el HaOsher (On the Road to Happiness) was released in 1989 and was even more successful, selling over 100,000 copies. The popular songs of this album are "Baderekh el HaOsher" (On the Road to Happiness) and "Eikh Hu Shar" (How He Sings) – which many assumed to be written on Zohar Argov, but as Robas told, was written about successful singers falling into drug abuse in general, such as Janis Joplin on Jim Morrison. Robas won the "Singer of the Year" title, and went on tour – this time with a full band which included in addition to Engler a bassist (Eli Bakal), a drummer (Ran Vered), and a backup singer (Shirli Yovel). The show was a great success, and Robas also performed with it outside Israel.

Robas' fourth album, BeGuf Rishon (In First Person), released in 1991, did not succeed as the previous two did. The popular songs of this album were "Ze Lo Kal Le'ehov Otakh" (Loving You Isn't Easy) and "Rakavot 68/80/88" (Trains 68/80/88) – a song dealing with the singer John Lennon and his death.

In 1993 Robas released another album, Broshim VeKhamaniot (Cataclypses and Sunflowers), and went on another tour. The album's popular songs were "Gar'inim" (Grains), "Broshim VeKhamaniot" (Cataclypses and Sunflowers), "HaBen Shel HaKosem" (The Magician's Son), and a cover version of a song he wrote for Esti Katz, "Ani Midbar" (I am a Desert). Robas' version was recorded with different lyrics.

In 1994 Robas released a collection of his best hits called Asor O SheAni Yoreh (Decade or I Shoot – a pun on "Stop or I shoot"). The album included a recording of the song "Lo Nirdemet Tel Aviv" from a live performance, and a first performance of the song "Hatzaga" (Show), which he wrote originally for a military band.

In 1996 Robas released a sixth album, Kakha Ani Ohev (That's the Way I Like). The song "Mikhtav Katan" (A small letter) from this album, a duet with Ofira Yosefi, became popular in memorial ceremonies.

In 2007 Robas started hosting the radio program Tziporei Layla (Night Birds). In the first hour of the show, he played songs he liked and told the stories behind them, and the second hour was dedicated to a whole album of an artist he liked, which he played in full and commented on. The show lasted till April 2010.

In February 2008, Robas released his 7th album, Mashehu Khadash Matkhil (Something New Begins), produced by Uri Zakh.

Robas performing in June 2023

In 2009 Robas hosted the TV program Duet Israeli (Israeli Duet), together with Aya Korem. In each show, they hosted an Israeli musician, talking with him about his sources of inspiration and the process of creating singing and playing some of the artist's songs.

For many years he was married to Dina, with whom he has 3 daughters. His second daughter, Roni, sometimes participates in his concerts as a backup singer. In 2007 his first grandson was born. In June 2009, he married the singer Ilil Tamir, daughter of Yehuda Tamir from the musical band "Khalav Udvash" (Milk and Honey), and in 2011 their daughter was born.

Robas is also known for his love of the Beatles, whose music he has been performing for many years alongside his regular concerts. In 1993–1994, he ran a show called SheYihye (Let It Be), dedicated to the Beatles' songs, with the keyboardist Dovi Engler, and the guitarist Amit Jurgenson. In the last decade, he sometimes still does this show, with his wife and daughter as backup singers.
