= Eshbal =

Eshbal: אשבל (Hebrew)
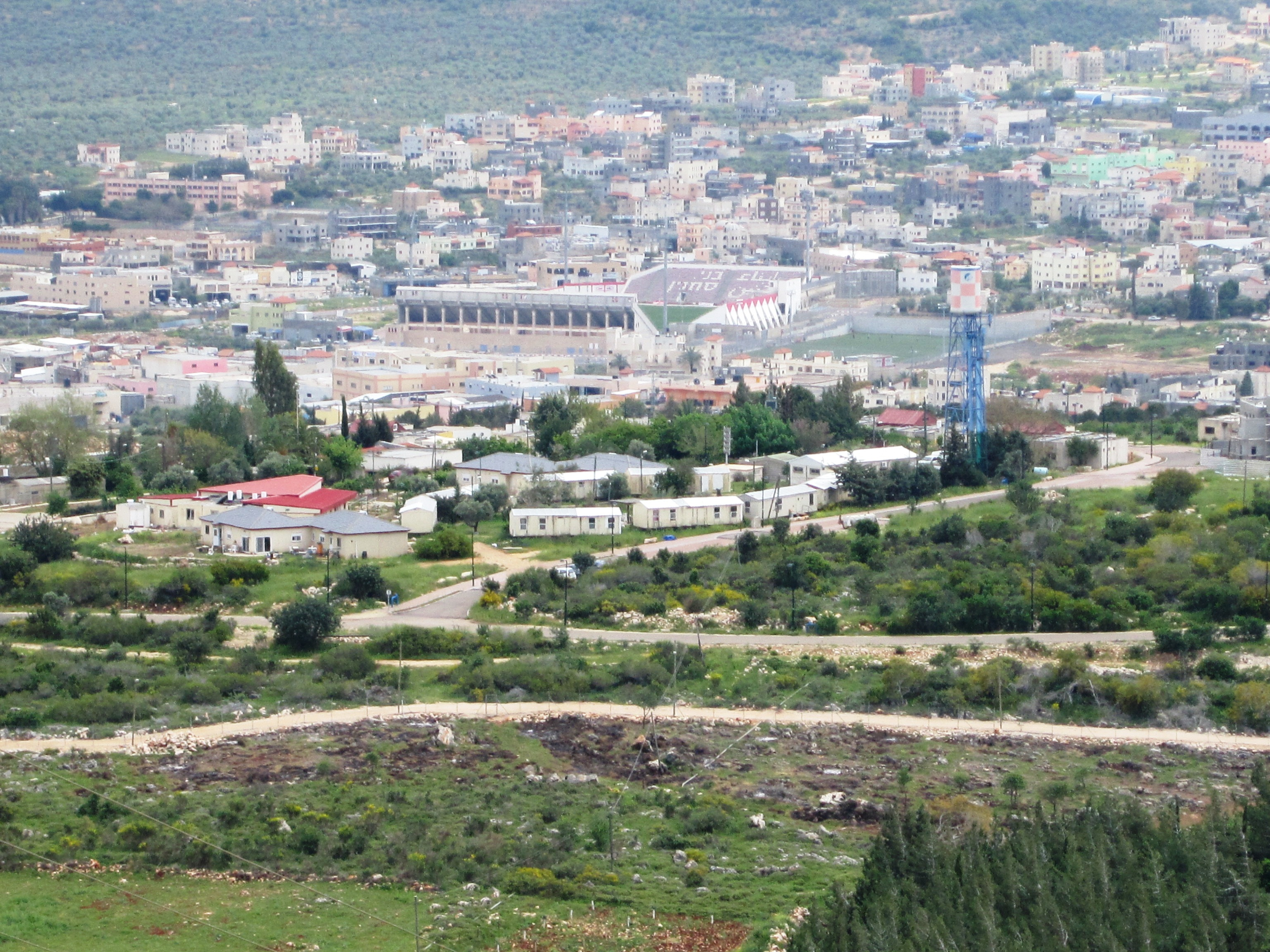

- Location within Northwest Israel Location within Israel
- Coordinates: 32°52′36″N 35°18′22″E
- Country: Israel
- District: Northern
- Subdistrict: Acre
- Council: Misgav
- Affiliation: Agricultural Union
- Founded: 1979
- Founder: Nahal
- Population (2024): 172
- Website: www.eshbal.org.il

Eshbal (Hebrew: אֶשְׁבָּל, lit. 'Stachys') is a kibbutz in northern Israel, located in the Lower Galilee near Karmiel. It falls under the jurisdiction of Misgav Regional Council. In 2024 it had a population of 172.

== History ==
Eshbal was founded in 1979 as a Nahal settlement and was named after the plant Stachys that grows in the area. It was civilianised in January 1998 by a kvutza of 30 HaNoar HaOved VeHaLomed youth group members.

Since 1998 Eshbal has been home to the Galil Jewish–Arab School. The kibbutz offers a variety of educational programs including a live-in boarding school and a high school in Karmiel. Most of the boarding school children are from the Ethiopian immigrant community, which is plagued by social problems due to the difficult absorption process. The kibbutz also runs outreach programs in local Arab and Bedouin villages and organizes Jewish-Arab dialogue events.
