= Patish =

Moshav in southern Israel

Patish: פטיש (Hebrew)
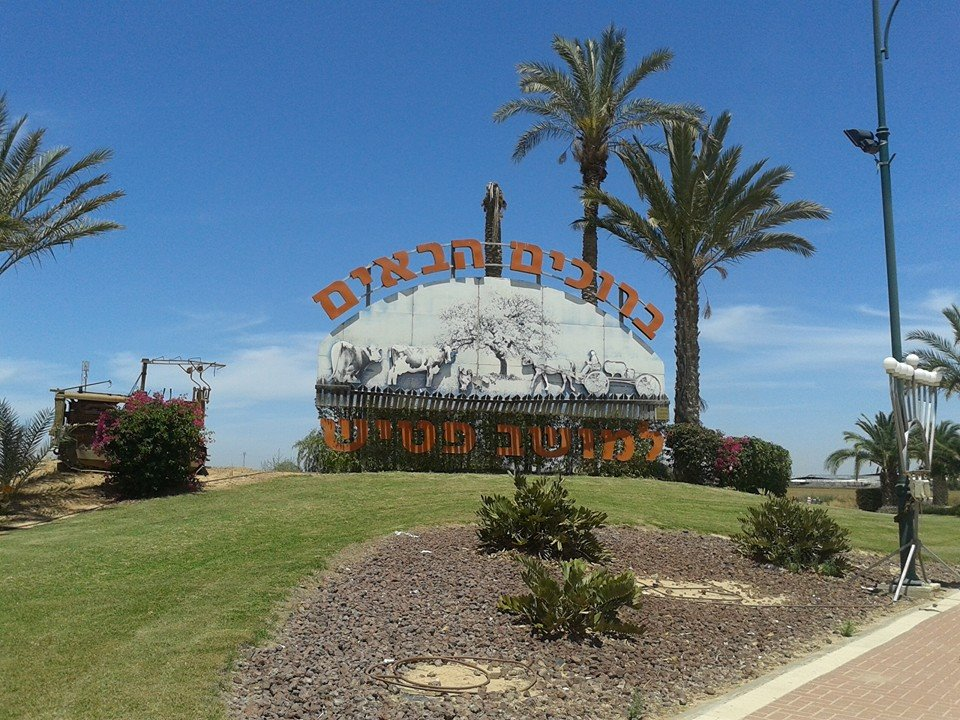
- Etymology: Hammer
- Location within Northwest Negev region of Israel Location within Israel
- Coordinates: 31°19′36″N 34°33′37″E
- Country: Israel
- District: Southern
- Subdistrict: Beersheba
- Council: Merhavim
- Affiliation: Moshavim Movement
- Founded: 3 March 1950
- Founder: Kurdish Jews
- Population (2024): 1,117

Patish (Hebrew: פטיש, lit. 'Hammer') is a moshav in southern Israel. Located in the north-western Negev desert near Ofakim, it falls under the jurisdiction of Merhavim Regional Council. In 2024 it had a population of 1,117.

== History ==
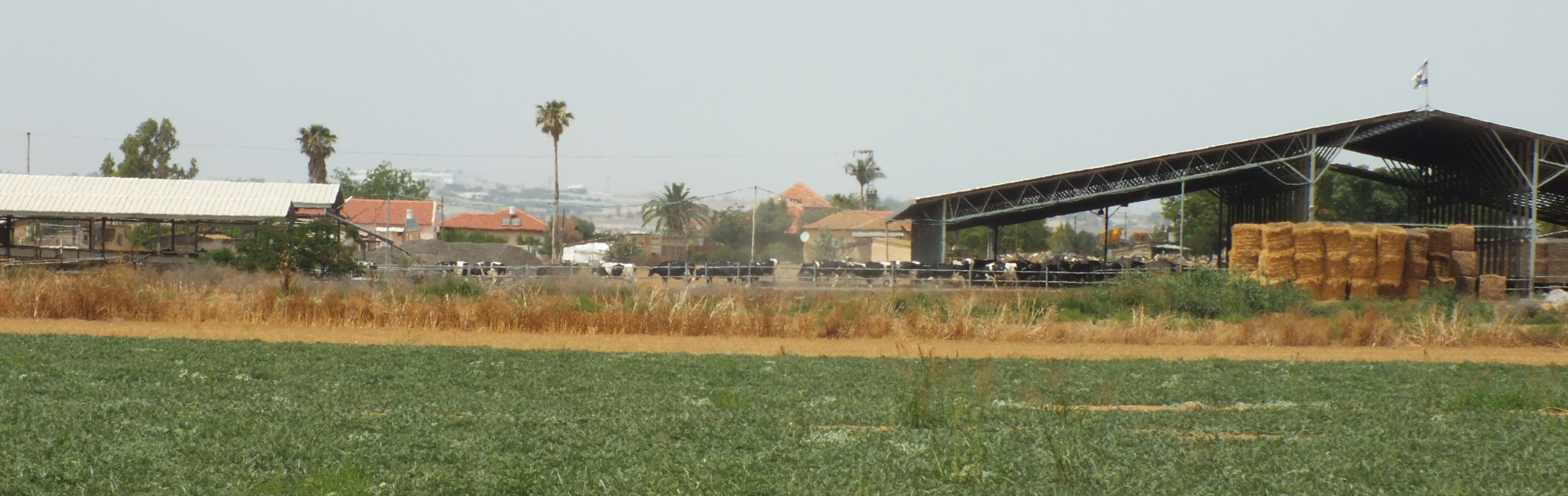
Moshav Patish

Patish was established on 3 March 1950, and was named after Horvat Patish (Patish Ruins) which lies about 6km to the east. To begin with, immigrants from Egypt were brought to settle the site. However, they refused to leave the truck which brought them to the site. After several trials, a group of Kurdish Jews settled in the moshav in May that year.

In March 1955 armed Palestinian fedayeen from the Gaza Strip attacked a wedding at the village with hand grenades; 24 guests were injured and one killed.

In 2023, Energix Renewable Energies established a renewable energy complex featuring solar panels and energy infrastructure at a site adjacent to Patish that underwent a major environmental clean-up operation in preparation for the project.
