= Peduim =

Peduim: פדויים (Hebrew)
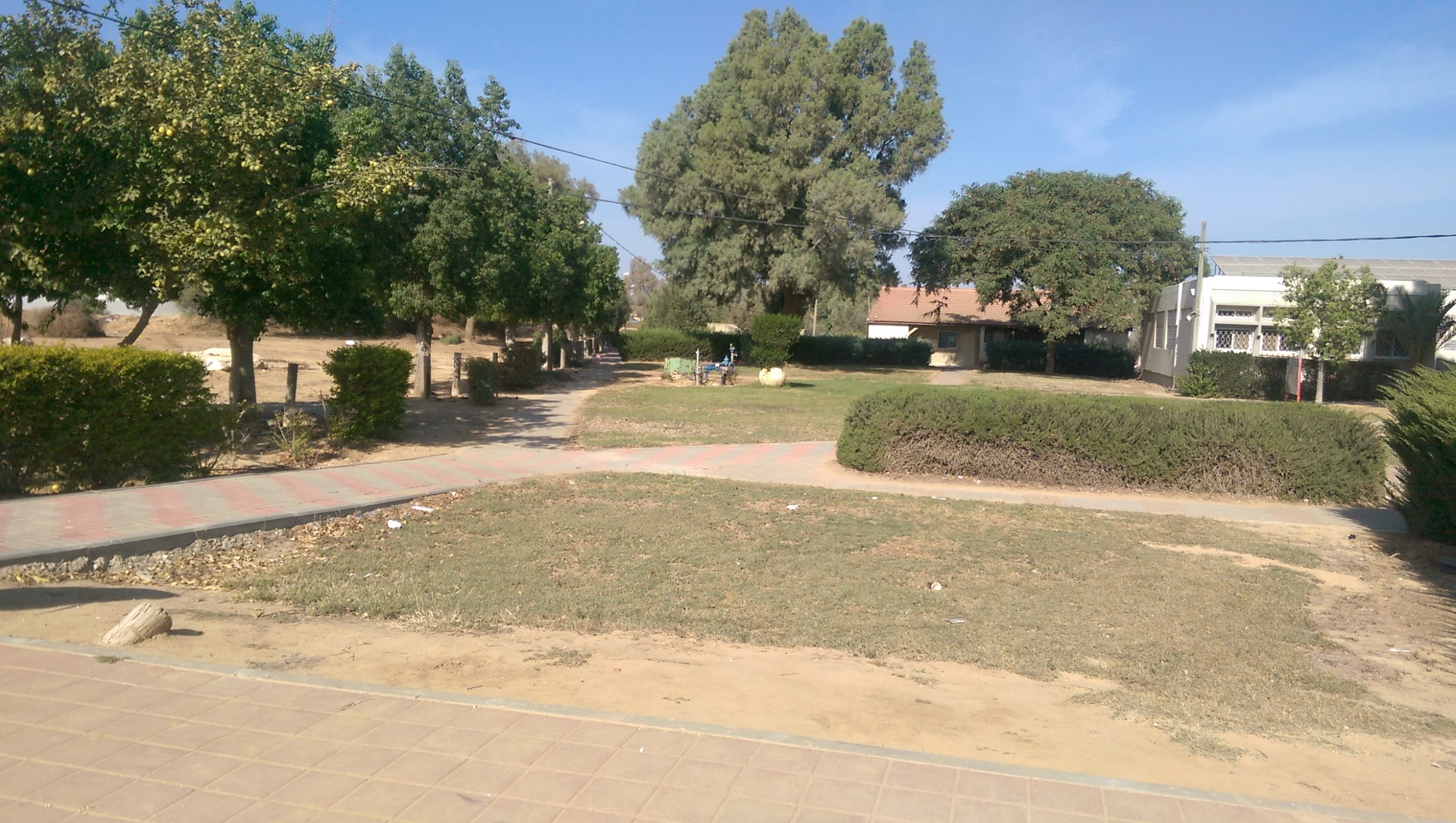
- Etymology: Ransomed
- Location within Northwest Negev region of Israel Location within Israel
- Coordinates: 31°19′38″N 34°36′40″E
- Country: Israel
- District: Southern
- Subdistrict: Beersheba
- Council: Merhavim
- Affiliation: Moshavim Movement
- Founded: 1950
- Founder: Yemenite Jews
- Population (2024): 496

Peduim (Hebrew: פדויים, lit. 'Ransomed') is a moshav in southern Israel. Located in the north-western Negev desert near Ofakim, it falls under the jurisdiction of Merhavim Regional Council. In 2024 it had a population of 496.

== History ==
The moshav was established in 1950 by immigrants from Yemen. Like several other moshavim in the area, its name is taken from the Book of Isaiah 35:10;

And the ransomed of the LORD shall return, and come with singing unto Zion, and everlasting joy shall be upon their heads; they shall obtain gladness and joy, and sorrow and sighing shall flee away.
