= Eshbol =

Moshav in southern Israel

Eshbol: אשבול (Hebrew)
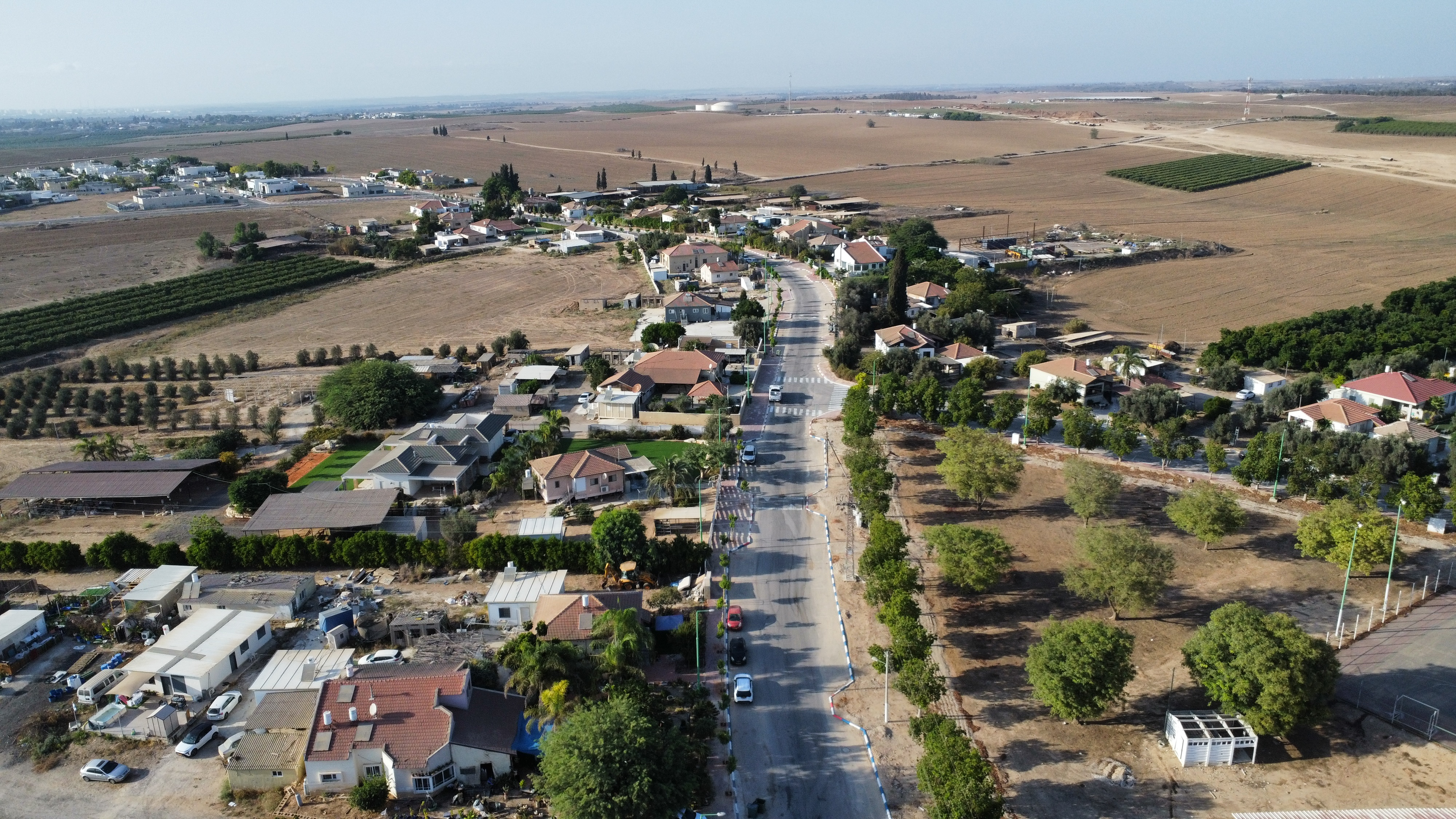

- Location within Ashkelon region of Israel Location within Israel
- Coordinates: 31°26′47″N 34°40′2″E
- Country: Israel
- District: Southern
- Subdistrict: Beersheba
- Council: Merhavim
- Affiliation: Moshavim Movement
- Founded: 1954
- Founder: Iranian Jews
- Population (2024): 736

Eshbol (Hebrew: אשבול) is a moshav in southern Israel. Located in the north-western Negev desert near Netivot and Rahat, it falls under the jurisdiction of Merhavim Regional Council. In 2024 it had a population of 736.

== History ==
Eshbol was established in 1954 as a farm by members of the "Eshbol" organisation who were immigrants from Iran.
