= Sde Tzvi =

Sde Tzvi: שדה צבי (Hebrew)
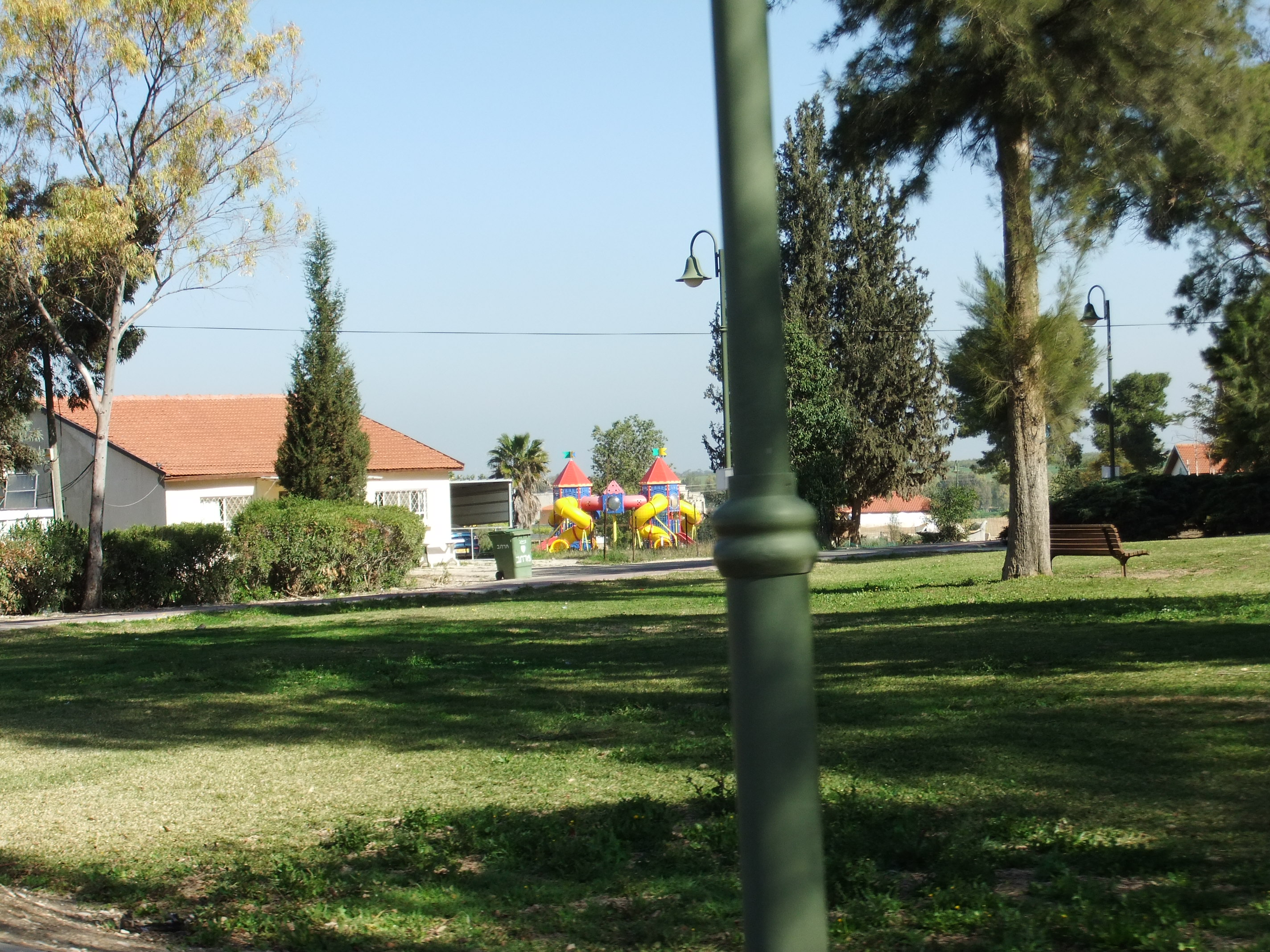
- Etymology: Zvi Field
- Location within Northwest Negev region of Israel Location within Israel
- Coordinates: 31°26′56″N 34°42′45″E
- Country: Israel
- District: Southern
- Subdistrict: Beersheba
- Council: Merhavim
- Affiliation: Agricultural Union
- Founded: 1953
- Founder: North African Jews
- Population (2024): 795

Sde Tzvi (Hebrew: שדה צבי, lit. 'Zvi Field') is a moshav in southern Israel. Located in the north-western Negev desert near Rahat, it falls under the jurisdiction of Merhavim Regional Council. In 2024 it had a population of 795.

== History ==
The village was established in 1953 by Jewish immigrants and refugees from North Africa. It was named after Zvi Hirshfeld, a founder of Ruhama who also helped found the new moshav.
