= Eshkolot (Jewish Studies book series) =

Jewish Studies Book Series

"Eshkolot" is a Jewish Studies book series, edited by Amos Geula, a project of the Herzog College research institute that is published by the research authority of Herzog College in collaboration with the World Union of Jewish Studies. The Judaic Studies series includes works from the various fields of Judaism, which have a significant contribution and are a complete study of a particular subject or a critical edition (scientific edition) of a manuscript with a comprehensive introduction. Each book is accompanied by a professional academic committee and undergoes academic editing as well as peer review. Some of the books in the series have unique databases open to the public which can be found on the Herzog College's Research Authority website under "Herzog Databases".

Eshkolot Jewish Studies Series Logo

== Books published by the Eshkolot Jewish Studies Series ==
The following books have been published by the Eshkolot Jewish Studies book series:

1.Nahmanides' Torah Commentary Addenda:

- Nahmanides' Torah Commentary Addenda, by Professor Yosef Ofer and Professor Jonathan Jacobs (2013).
- Nahmanides' Torah Commentary Addenda, Second Edition, by Professor Yosef Ofer and Professor Jonathan Jacobs (2022).

2.The Geonic Talmud – The Attitude of Babylonian Geonim to the Text of the Babylonian Talmud, by Dr. Uziel Fuchs (2017).

3.Midrash Hachamim Commentary on the Torah, by Dr. Yoav Barzily (2017).

4.Rabbi Kalonymus Kalman Shapira – Sermons from the Years of Rage:

- Rabbi Kalonymus Kalman Shapira – Sermons from the Years of Rage, Vol. 1: Critical Edition with an Introduction, by Professor Daniel Reiser (2017).
- Rabbi Kalonymus Kalman Shapira – Sermons from the Years of Rage, Vol 2: Facsimile Edition with transcription, by Professor Daniel Reiser (2017).
- Rabbi Kalonymus Kalman Shapira – Sermons from the Years of Rage, Vol. 1: Critical Edition with an Introduction, Second Revised Edition, by Professor Daniel Reiser (2022).

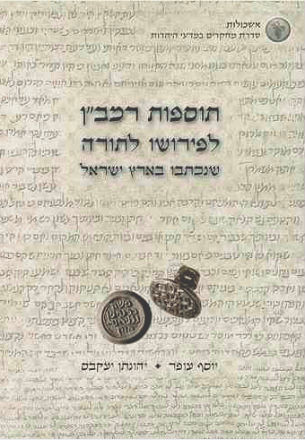
Book cover Nahmanides' Torah Commentary Addenda by Professor Yosef Ofer and Professor Jonathan Jacobs. One of the books from the "Eshkolot Jewish Studies Series"

5.Midrash Agadat Beresheit, by Ezra Kahalani (2021).

6.Rabbi Joseph Hayyun's Commentary on the Book of Jeremiah, By Dr. Yohanan Kapah in collaboration with The David Moses and Amalia Rosen Foundation (2022).

7. Midrash Eicha Zuta, A Critical Edition, By Dr Anat Reizel-Nakar in collaboration with The David Moses and Amalia Rosen Foundation (2024).

== Funding ==
The series is mainly funded by the Research Authority at Herzog College and the World Union of Jewish Studies. Additional support is received by other foundations including the Israel Science Foundation, The Israeli Lottery Council for Culture and Arts- Mifal HaPayis, The Legacy Committee Estates and Trusts Department of the State of Israel, the Amalia and Rabbi Moshe Rosen Foundation and The International Institute for Holocaust Research of Yad VaShem, and the Israeli Center of Libraries, Ministry of Culture and Sport (Israel).

== Prizes ==
In 2017 The book Nahmanides' Torah Commentary Addenda won the Yad Yitzchak Ben Tzvi prize on exploration of the communities of Israel in the East and the communities of Spain and their dispersal.

In 2018 the book Rabbi Kalonymus Kalman Shapira – Sermons from the Years of Rage won the Yad Vashem international book prize for Holocaust research.

== Book reviews ==
1. Hananel Mack, Yehuda Tropper and Eliezer Brodt each wrote a review on Nahmanides' Torah Commentary Addenda
2. Carmiel Cohen and Pinchas Roth each wrote a review on The Geonic Talmud – The Attitude of Babylonian Geonim to the Text of the Babylonian Talmud
3. Jonathan Jacobs wrote a review on Midrash Hachamim Commentary On the Torah
4. Uriel Gelman, James DeMont, Henry Abrahamson, Shaul Maggid and Moria Herman each wrote a review on Rabbi Kalonymus Kalman Shapira – Sermons from the Years of Rage.
5. Hananel Mack wrote a review on Midrash Agadat Beresheit.

== Databases ==
Some of the series' books are accompanied by unique online databases which are open to public use.

1. Nahmanides' Torah Commentary Addenda has a database which includes a comparison between the different versions of Nahmanides' Torah Commentary that appear in different manuscripts

2. Rabbi Kalonymus Kalman Shapira – Sermons from the Years of Rage has a database which includes an exact transcript of the manuscript (at all its layers) as well as the corresponding page from the facsimile, organized by parasha order and holidays.

3. The book Midrash Aggadat Bereishit is accompanied by a synopsis database of transcripts of all writings, genizah passages and secondary textual witnesses, in the order of the chapters and paragraphs.
