= Pa'amei Tashaz =

Pa'amei Tashaz: פעמי תש״ז (Hebrew)
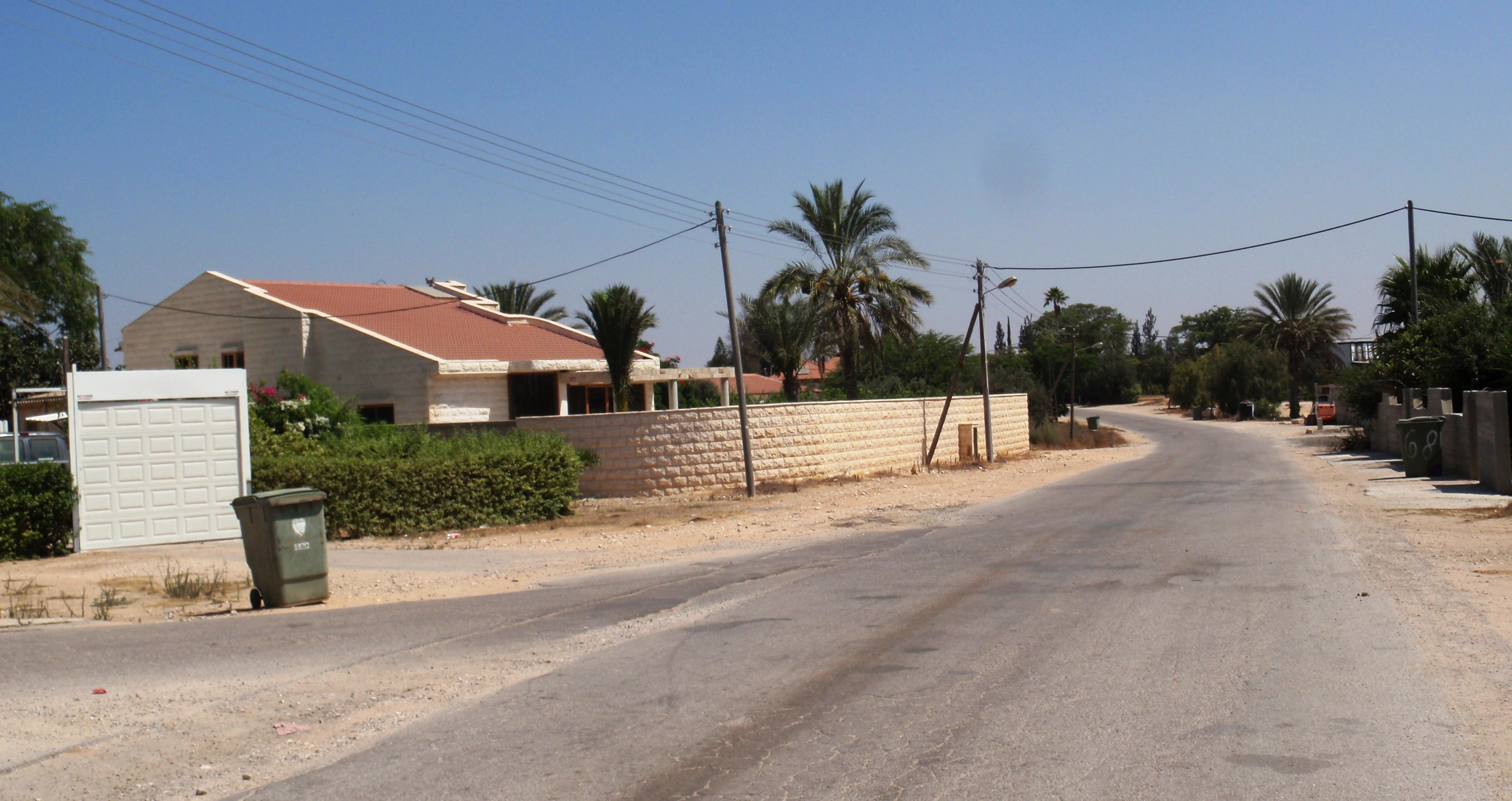

- Location within Northwest Negev region of Israel Location within Israel
- Coordinates: 31°26′21″N 34°41′34″E
- Country: Israel
- District: Southern
- Subdistrict: Beersheba
- Council: Merhavim
- Affiliation: Moshavim Movement
- Founded: 1953
- Founder: Iranian Jews
- Population (2024): 793

Pa'amei Tashaz (Hebrew: פעמי תש״ז) is a moshav in southern Israel. Located in the northwestern Negev desert between Netivot and Rahat, it falls under the jurisdiction of Merhavim Regional Council. In 2024 it had a population of 793.

== History ==
The moshav was established in 1953 by immigrants from Iran. It was named for the 11 outposts in the Negev established in October 1946 (Tashaz in the Hebrew calendar).
