= Talmei Bilu =

Talmei Bilu: תלמי ביל״ו (Hebrew)
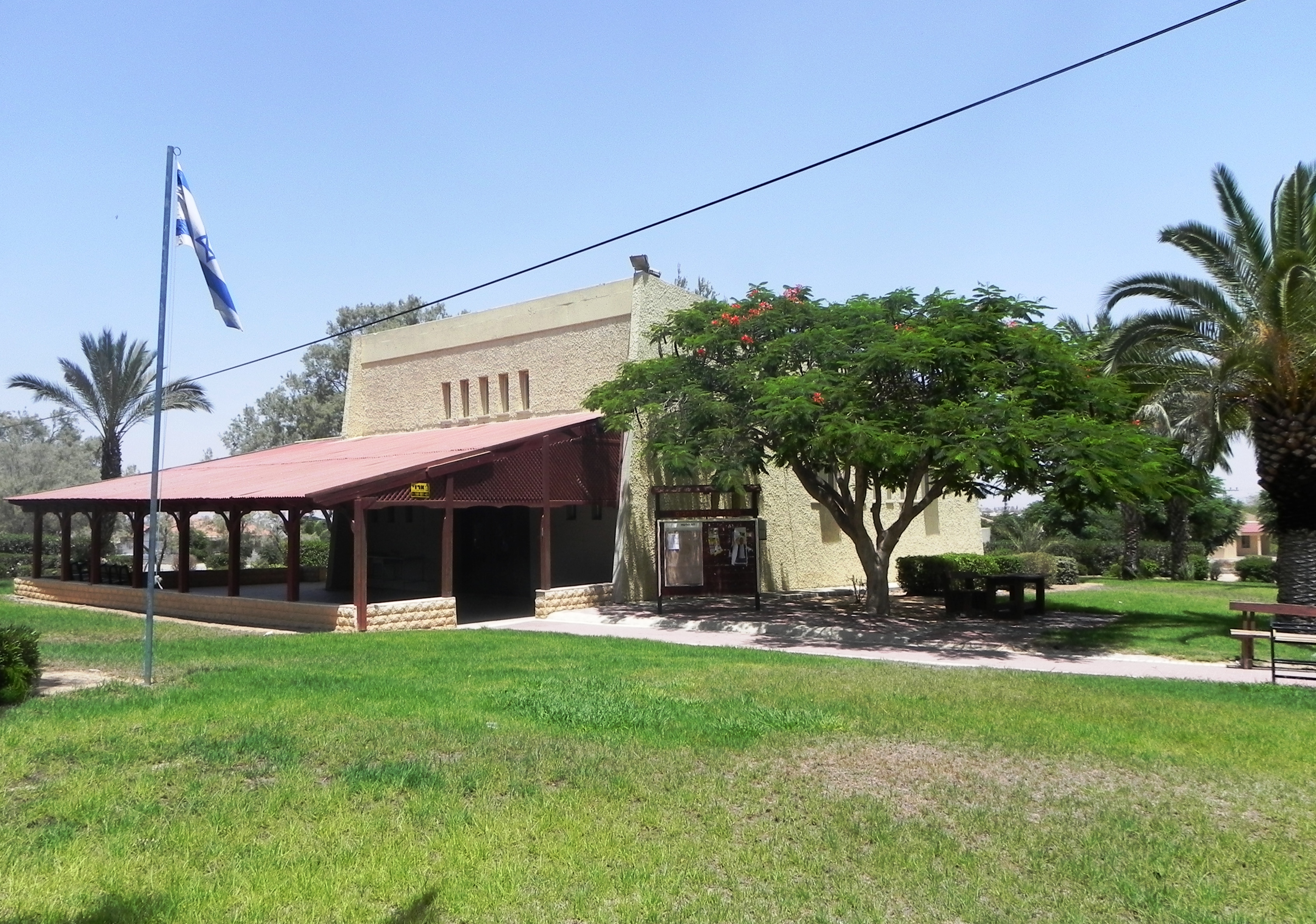
- Etymology: Bilu Furrows
- Location within Northwest Negev region of Israel Location within Israel
- Coordinates: 31°26′17″N 34°38′43″E
- Country: Israel
- District: Southern
- Subdistrict: Beersheba
- Council: Merhavim
- Affiliation: Hitahdut HaIkarim
- Founded: 1953
- Founder: Kurdish and Romanian Jews
- Population (2024): 708

Talmei Bilu (Hebrew: תלמי ביל״ו, lit. 'Bilu Furrows') is a moshav in southern Israel. Located in the north-western Negev desert near Netivot and Rahat, it falls under the jurisdiction of Merhavim Regional Council. In 2024 it had a population of 708.

== History ==
The moshav was established in 1953 by immigrants from Kurdistan and Romania. Its name marked the 70th anniversary of the first Bilu arriving in the Land of Israel.
