= Gilat =

Moshav in southern Israel

Gilat: גילת (Hebrew)
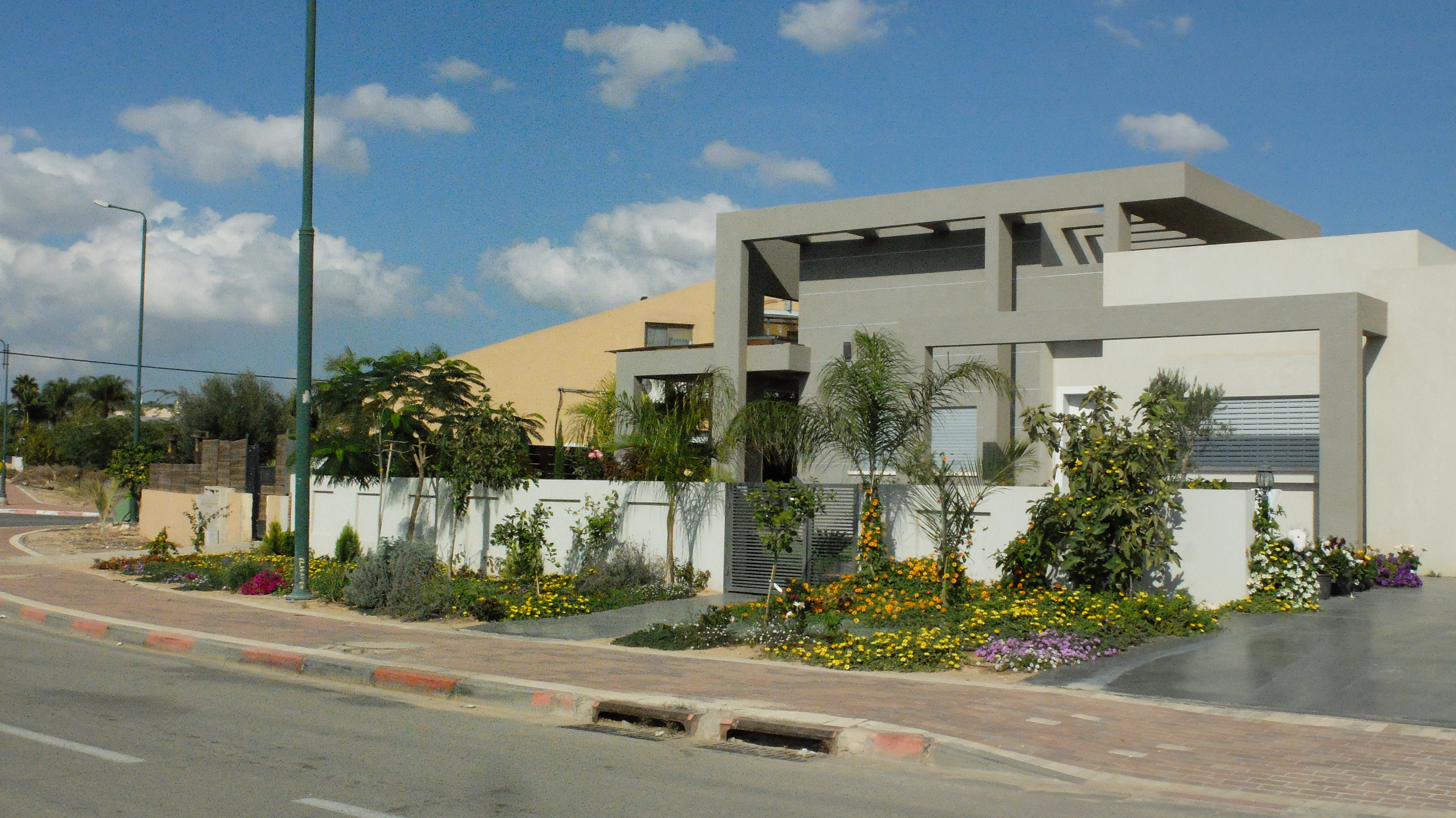
- Etymology: Joy
- Location within Northwest Negev region of Israel Location within Israel
- Coordinates: 31°19′43″N 34°39′0″E
- Country: Israel
- District: Southern
- Subdistrict: Beersheba
- Council: Merhavim
- Affiliation: Moshavim Movement
- Founded: 1949
- Founder: Tunisian Jews
- Population (2024): 1,666

Gilat (Hebrew: גילת, lit. 'Joy') is a moshav in southern Israel. Located in the western Negev desert between Beersheba and Ofakim, it falls under the jurisdiction of Merhavim Regional Council. In 2024 it had a population of 1,666.

== History ==
The moshav was founded in 1949 by Jewish refugees from an Arab country, Tunisia. Like the names of two other moshavim (Tifrah, Ranen) in the area its name was taken from the Book of Isaiah 35:2:

(The desert,) it shall blossom abundantly, and rejoice even with joy and singing.

== Notable people ==
- Aharon Uzan (1924–2007), government minister
- Pini Badash (born 1952), Knesset member
