= Bitkha =

Moshav in southern Israel

Bitkha: בטחה (Hebrew)
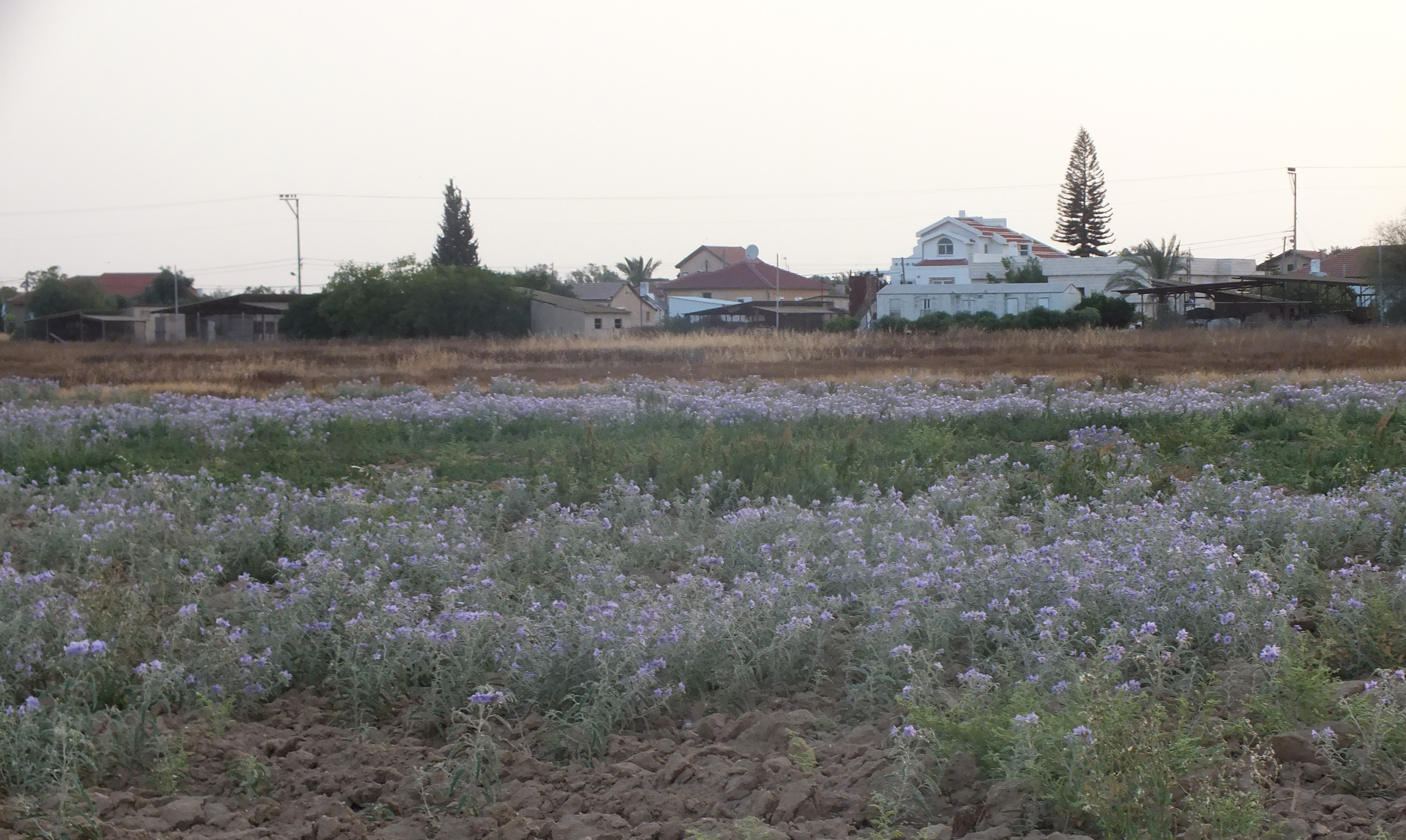

- Location within Northwest Negev region of Israel Location within Israel
- Coordinates: 31°20′4″N 34°37′57″E
- Country: Israel
- District: Southern
- Subdistrict: Beersheba
- Council: Merhavim
- Affiliation: Moshavim Movement
- Founded: 1950
- Founder: Yemenite Jews
- Population (2024): 894

Bitkha (Hebrew: בטחה) is a moshav in southern Israel. Located in the north-western Negev desert near Ofakim, it falls under the jurisdiction of Merhavim Regional Council. In 2024 it had a population of 894.

== History ==
Bitkha was established in 1950 as a ma'abara named Hakam Ha-107 (lit. 'The 107th Kilometer') after the milestone on the Beersheba-Gaza road which showed it to be 107 kilometers to Jerusalem. It was later converted to a moshav by immigrants from Yemen and was renamed Bitkha, taken from the Book of Isaiah 30:15;

For thus said the Lord GOD, the Holy One of Israel: in sitting still and rest shall ye be saved, in quietness and in confidence shall be your strength; and ye would not.
