= Eshel HaNasi =

Youth village in southern Israel

Eshel HaNasi: אשל הנשיא (Hebrew); إيشيل هنسي (Arabic)
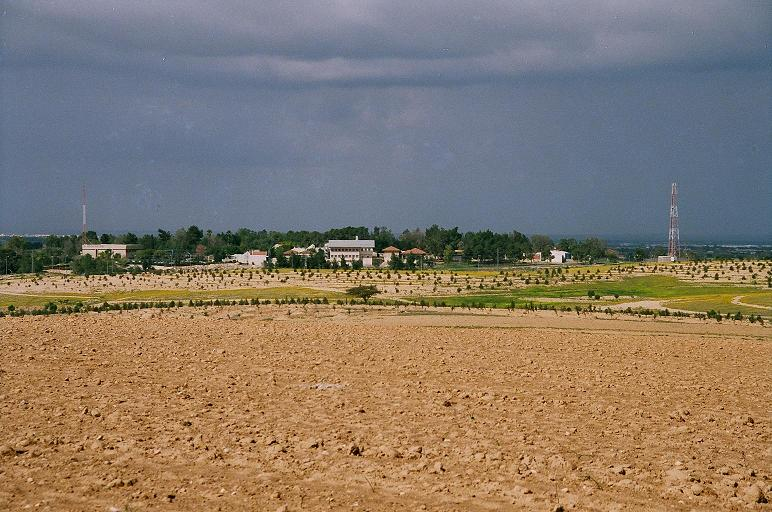

- Location within Northern Negev region of Israel
- Coordinates: 31°19′37″N 34°41′51″E
- Country: Israel
- District: Southern
- Subdistrict: Beersheba
- Council: Merhavim
- Founded: 1952
- Population (2024): 151
- Website: www.eshelnet.com

Eshel HaNasi (Hebrew: אֵשֶׁל הַנָּשִׂיא, lit. Tamarisk of the President) is a youth village in southern Israel. Located between Beersheba and Ofakim, it falls under the jurisdiction of Merhavim Regional Council. In 2024 it had a population of 151.

== History ==
A school was established on the site in 1951, and took its name from the tamarisk trees that grow in the region, and from the title of the President of Israel, in honor of Israel's first president, Chaim Weizmann. Taken together, the name means "Tamarisk of the President."

The following year an agricultural school and youth village were founded on the site, taking the name of the original school. Today it contains a boarding school and a high school teaching around 1,500 pupils from 7th to 12th grade.
