= Shoval =

Kibbutz in southern Israel

Shoval: שובל (Hebrew)
- An entrance to Shoval, 2012

- Location within Northwest Negev region of Israel Location within Israel
- Coordinates: 31°24′46″N 34°44′34″E
- Country: Israel
- District: Southern
- Subdistrict: Beersheba
- Council: Bnei Shimon
- Affiliation: Kibbutz Movement
- Founded: 6 October 1946
- Founder: Hashomer Hatzair members
- Population (2024): 1,052

Shoval (Hebrew: שובל) is a kibbutz in southern Israel. Located in the northern Negev desert near the Bedouin city of Rahat, it falls under the jurisdiction of Bnei Shimon Regional Council. In 2024 it had a population of 1,052.

== Etymology ==
The kibbutz founders wanted to name it "Eilat" as they wanted to settle near the Red Sea, however, the naming committee chose the name Shoval.
The origin of the name is from two passages in the Books of Chronicles:

″The sons of Se'ir: Lotan, Shoval, Tziv'on, 'Anah, Dishon, Etzer and Dishan.″ - 1 Chronicles 1:38
″The descendants of Y'hudah: Peretz, Hetzron, Karmi, Hur and Shoval.″ - 1 Chronicles 4:1

== History ==
The kibbutz was founded on 6 October 1946 as part of the 11 points operation by a gar'in whose members were of Hashomer Hatzair and Aliyah Bet immigrants who had survived the Patria disaster that was part of the struggle against the British rule banning Jewish refugees from entering Mandatory Palestine.

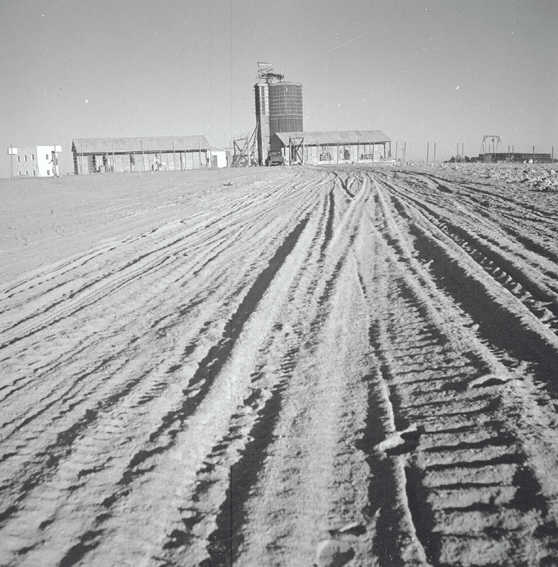
Shoval 1946

Shoval, 1947

Kibbutzniks with Bedouins

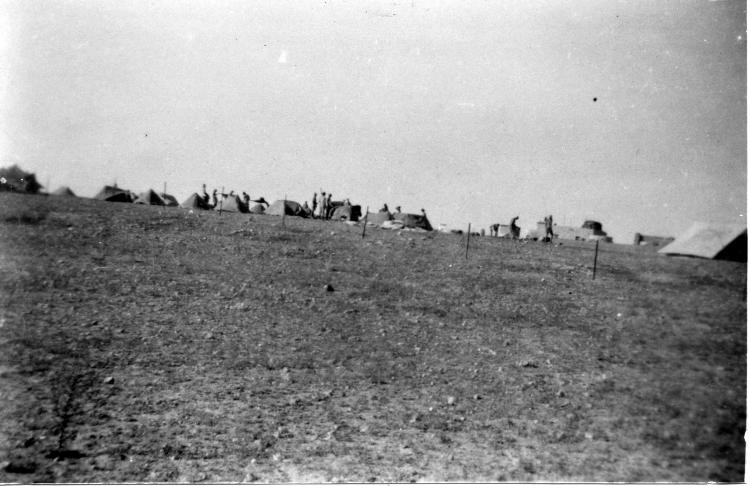
Yiftach Brigade camp at Shoval. 1948

Harvest of 1974

Shoval, 2007

Shoval, 2007

Shoval, 2007

== Economy ==
Shoval has two major sources of income; agriculture and plastics manufacturing. Its dairy farm is one of the largest in the area and is managed as a partnership with kibbutz Na'an. It also has a vast area of arable land where wheat, barley and potatoes are grown. In addition there are several chicken coops that are mainly used to raise chickens for meat. The kibbutz also operates a plastic seals manufacturing plant named Seal Jet.

Arava Power Company operates a solar farm on Shoval's land. This 24 acre farm can produce 6.4 MW using 22100 JA Solar panels.

== Notable people ==
- Yehuda Bauer, historian
- Itzhak Bentov, engineer and scientist
- Elazar Granot, former member of the Knesset
- Yehudit Kafri, poet and author
- Danny Robas, musician
