= Gerar Natural Region =

Coordinates: 31°25′08″N 34°35′13″E

- Natural Region
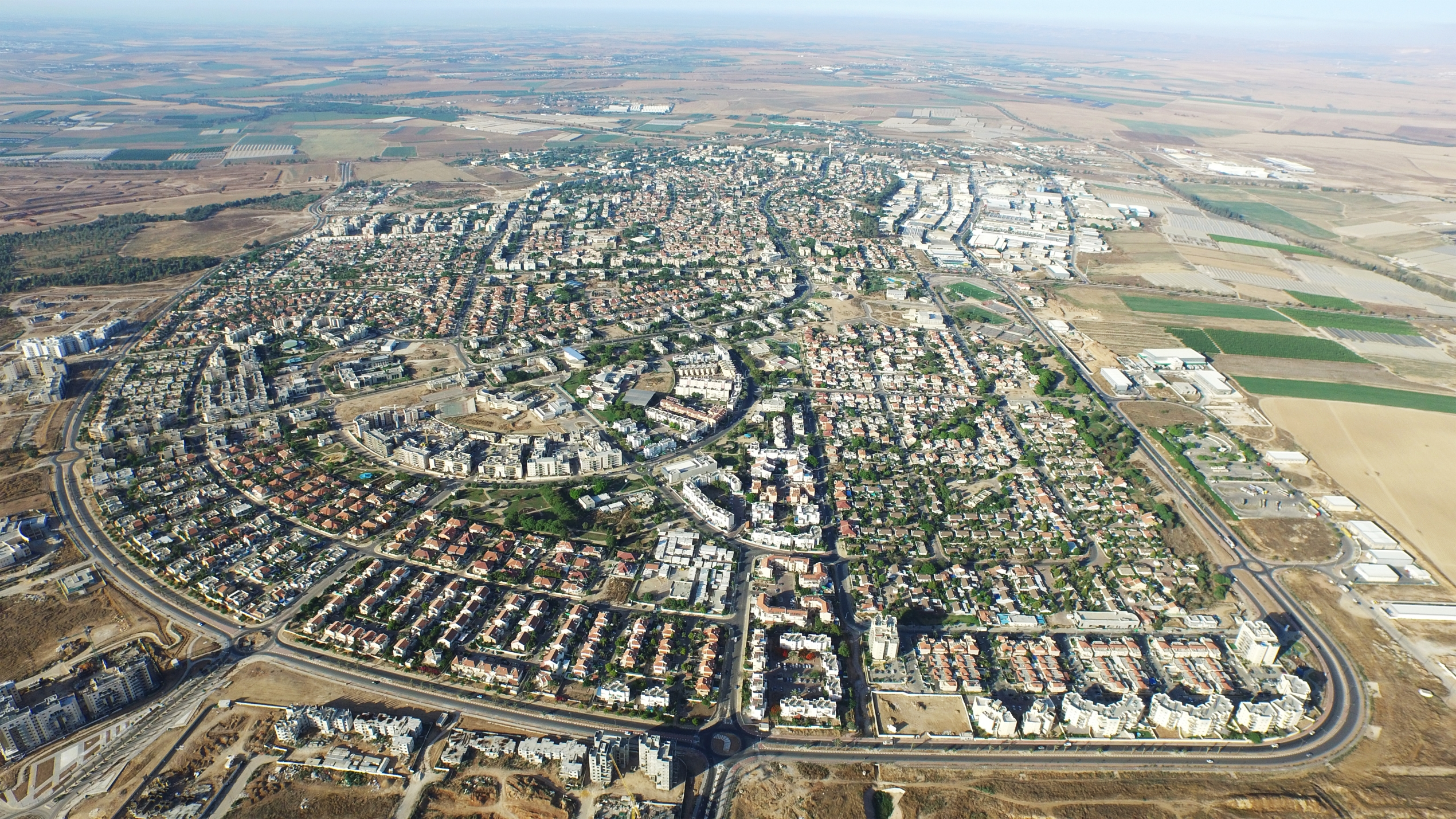
- View of Netivot, the largest city in the Gerar Natural Region
- Country: Israel
- District: Southern
- Subdistrict: Beersheba
- Largest City: Netivot

Area
  - Total: 310 km^{2} (120 sq mi)

Population (2024)
  - Total: 80,268

Ethnicity
  - Jews and others: 95.0%
  - Arabs: 0.2%

The Gerar Natural Region is a natural region in the Beersheba Subdistrict, in the Southern District of Israel. Netivot is the largest city in the natural region.

== Geography ==
Districts, Subdistricts and Natural Regions of the State of Israel, 2018

The natural region consists of a mostly-rural swath of land located between Ashkelon and Beersheba. It is named after the Gerar Stream, itself named after an ancient city in present-day south-central Israel. It has an area of 310 km^{2}. The largest city in the natural region is Netivot, which contains 70 percent of the natural region's population. There are no other towns in the natural region with more than 2,000 people. The natural region contains portions of the Bnei Shimon, Merhavim, and Sdot Negev regional councils.

== Demographics ==
The vast majority of the residents of the Gerar Natural Region are Jewish. There are no Arab towns in the natural region.

Historical population
Year	Pop.	±%
1972	14,800	—
1983	16,900	+14.2%
1995	24,700	+46.2%
2008	40,100	+62.3%
2022	67,369	+68.0%
2024	80,268	+19.1%

== Administrative local authorities ==
Cities	Local Councils	Villages
Netivot	[None]	Bnei Shimon: Brosh; Beit Kama; Mishmar HaNegev; Shoval; Te'ashur; Tidhar; Merhavim: Eshbol; Klahim; Mabu'im; Nir Akiva; Nir Moshe; Pa'ame Tashaz; Sde Tzvi; Shavei Darom; Talmei Bilu; Sdot Negev: Beit HaGadi; Givolim; Kfar Maimon; Ma'agalim; Mlilot; Sa'ad; Sharsheret; Shibolim; Shokeda; Shuva; Tkuma; Tushia; Yoshivia; Zimrat; Zru'a

== Voting Patterns ==
In the 2022 election, 84 percent of voters in the natural region voted for the parties of the right-wing coalition led by Benjamin Netanyahu, while 14 percent voted for the parties of the center-left coalition led by Yair Lapid and 0.1 percent voted for the Arab parties.

In the 2026 election, 81 percent of voters in the natural region voted for the parties of the right-wing coalition led by Benjamin Netanyahu, while 14 percent voted for the parties of the center-left coalition led by Gadi Eisenkot and 0.1 percent voted for the Arab parties. An additional 2.1 percent voted for the Reservists, and 2 percent voted for Amcha Yisrael. Voter turnout increased 27 percent from the 2022 election.
