= Inauguration of a Torah scroll =

Jewish ceremony involving Torah scrolls

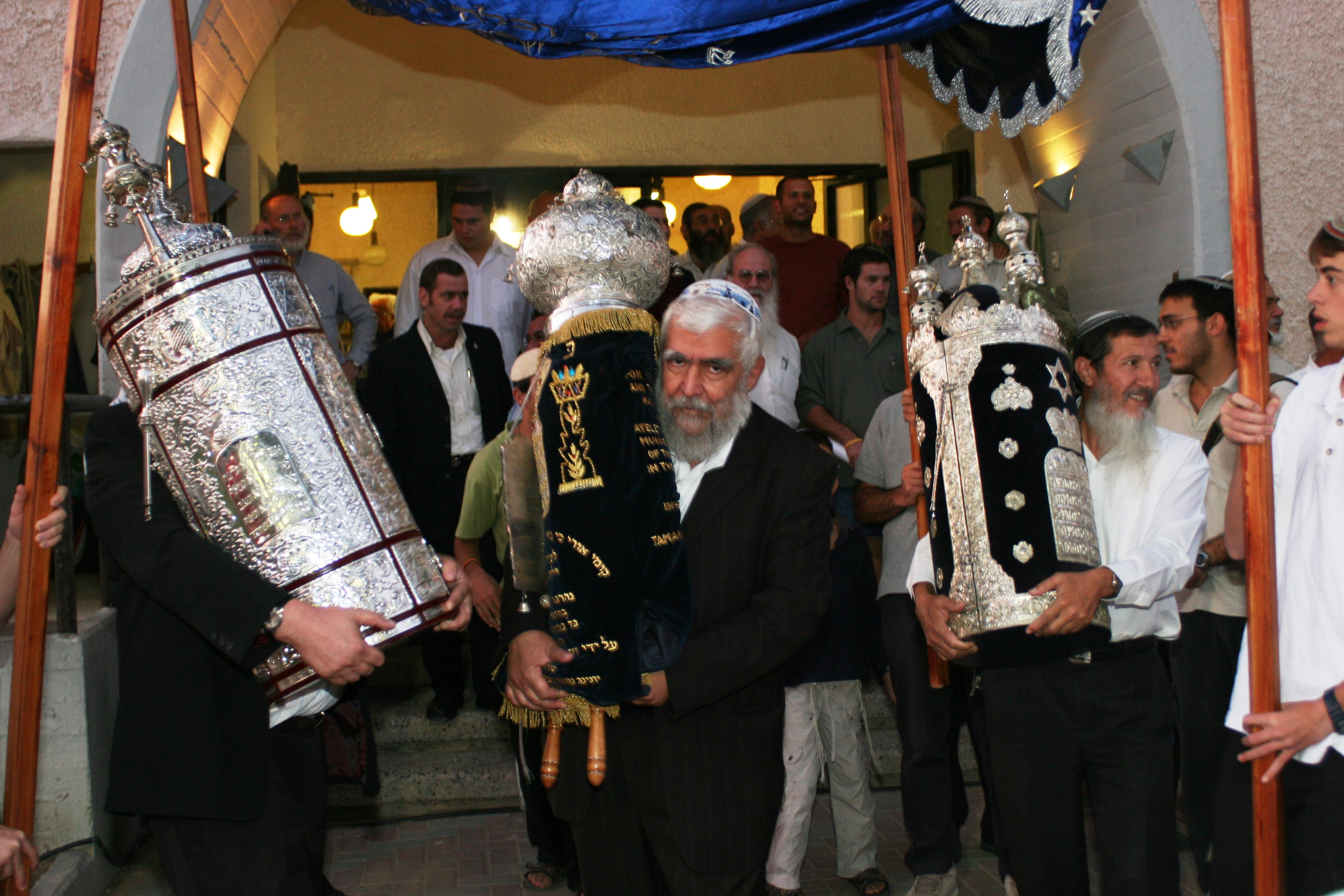
Torah scrolls are escorted to a new synagogue in Kfar Maimon, Israel, 2006

Inauguration of a Torah scroll (Hebrew: הכנסת ספר תורה, Hachnasat Sefer Torah; Ashkenazi: Hachnosas Sefer Torah) is a ceremony in which one or more Torah scrolls are installed in a synagogue, or in the sanctuary or study hall of a yeshiva, rabbinical college, university campus, nursing home, military base, or other institution, for use during prayer services. The inauguration ceremony is held for new and restored scrolls alike, as well as for the transfer of Torah scrolls from one sanctuary to another.

If the Torah scroll is a new one, the ceremony begins with the writing of the last letters of the scroll in the home of the donor. All scrolls are then carried in an outdoor procession to the scroll's new home, characterized by singing, dancing, and musical accompaniment. Inside the sanctuary, there is more singing and dancing, a short prayer service, placement of the scroll in the Torah ark, and a seudat mitzvah (festive meal).

== Background ==
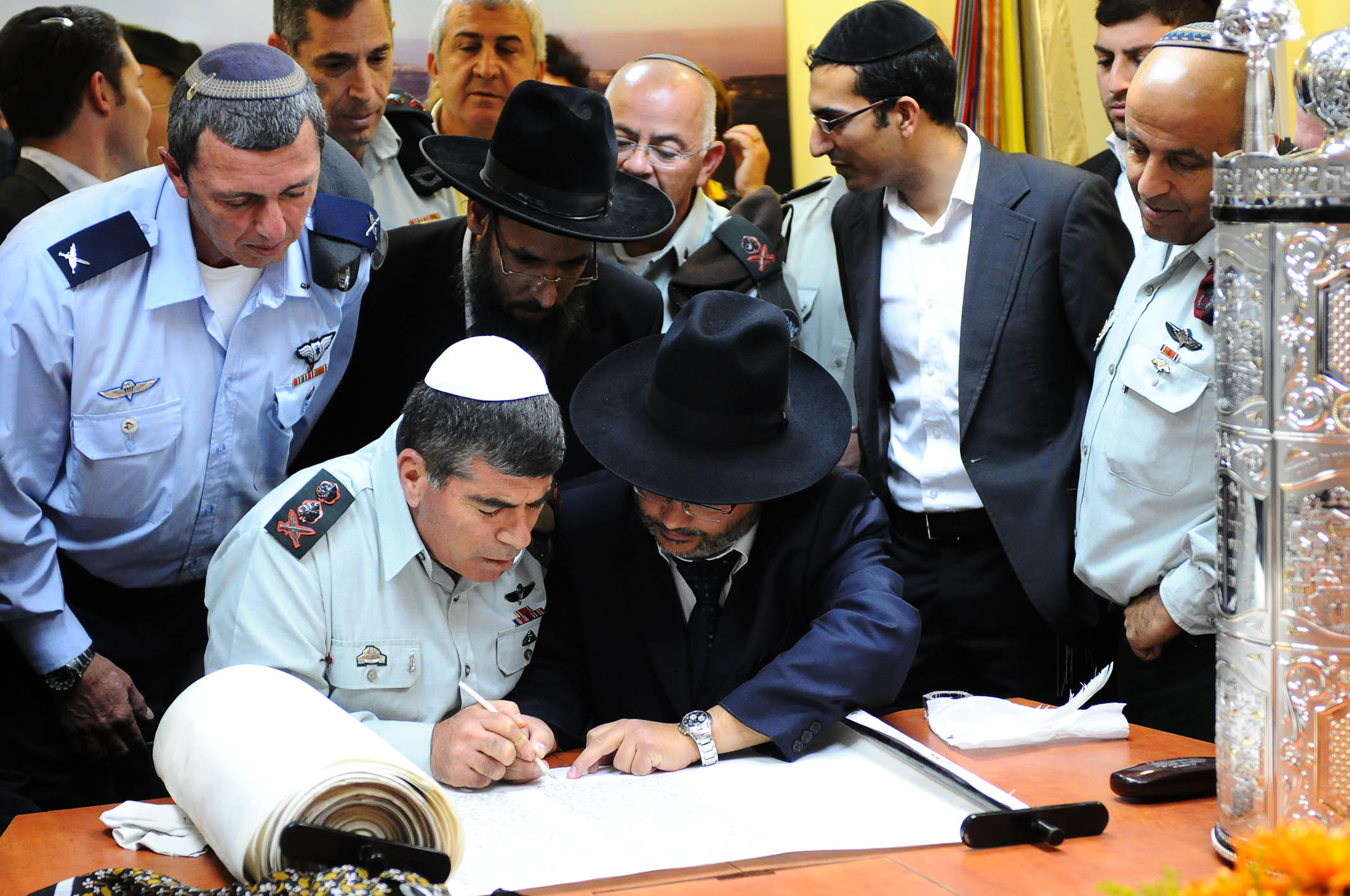
Israeli Chief of General Staff Gabi Ashkenazi is honored with the writing of the final letters in a Torah scroll dedicated to the welfare of missing or kidnapped IDF soldiers at the Rabin Base in Tel Aviv, 2010

The mitzvah to write a Torah scroll is the last of the 613 commandments. One can fulfill this mitzvah by writing a scroll oneself, or by commissioning the writing of a scroll.

Torah scrolls are typically commissioned by individuals to memorialize or honor loved ones; alternatively, a group or community may sponsor the writing of a Torah scroll to memorialize one or more of its members, especially those who were killed for being Jewish. Torah scrolls may also be commissioned as a fundraising project for synagogues, yeshivas, and organizations; individuals "buy" letters, words, verses, and chapters to cover the cost of the scroll. The cost of writing a Torah scroll is estimated at USD$30,000 to $100,000.

The finished Torah scroll is used during prayer services in a synagogue or other sanctuary, such as that of a yeshiva, rabbinical college, university campus, nursing home, military base, or other institution. The Torah scroll is taken out and read from four times a week – on Shabbat morning, Shabbat afternoon, and Monday and Thursday mornings – as well on Yom Tov, Rosh Chodesh, and Jewish fast days.

== History ==
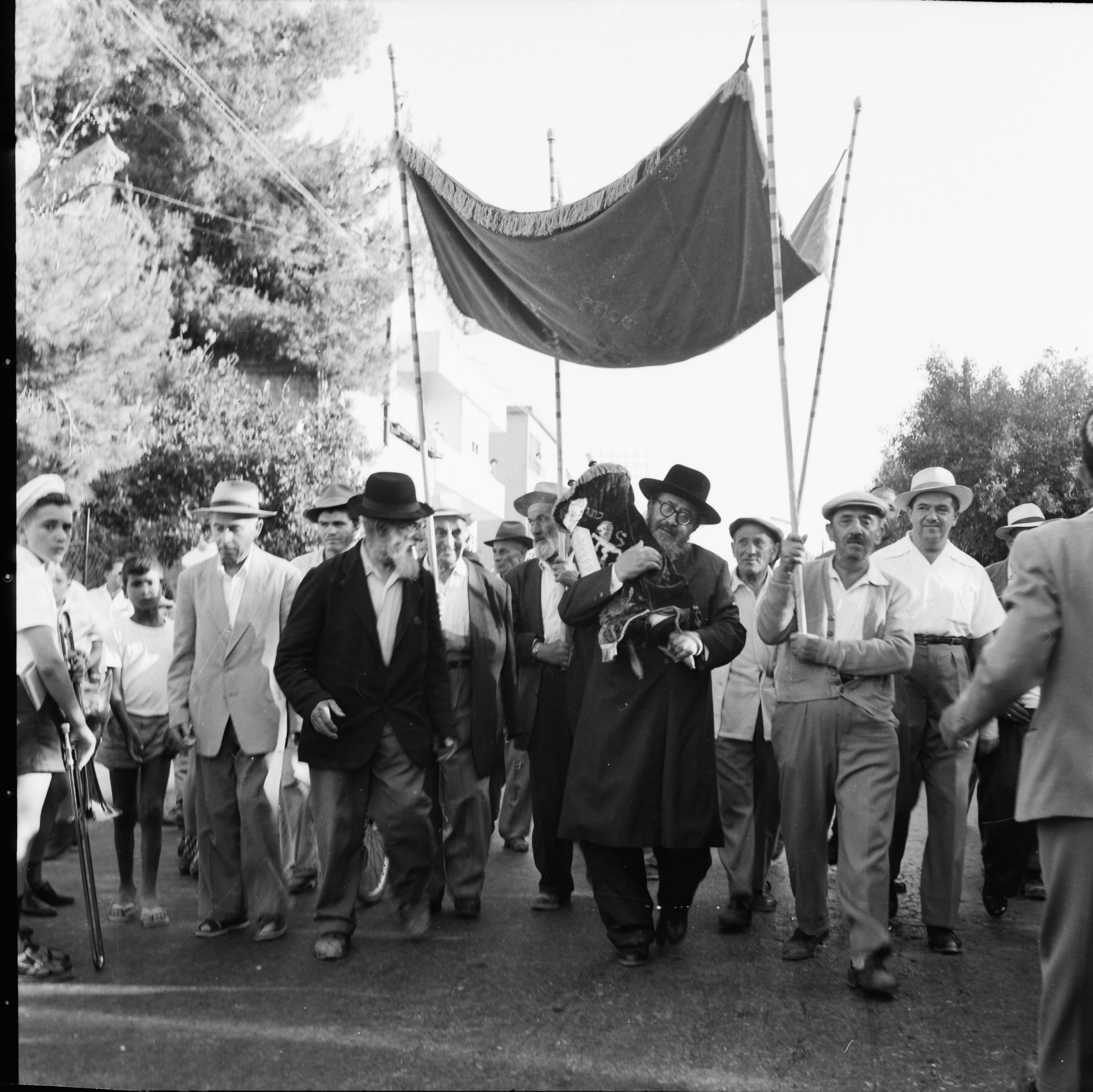
Hachnasat Sefer Torah procession in Lod, Israel, early 1960s

The escorting of a Torah scroll to its new home has its source in the procession of the Ark of the Covenant to Jerusalem, led by King David. As described in the Book of Samuel, this event was marked by dancing and the playing of musical instruments. Both the kohanim and David himself "danced before the Ark" or "danced before the Lord".

The inauguration ceremony is held for new and restored Torah scrolls alike. It is also held when a synagogue moves to a new location, or when scrolls are transferred from one institution to another. In 2008, for example, congregants of Temple Emanuel of North Jersey carried 15 Torah scrolls to their new sanctuary in Paterson in a gala procession.

== Ceremony description ==
=== Writing the final letters ===
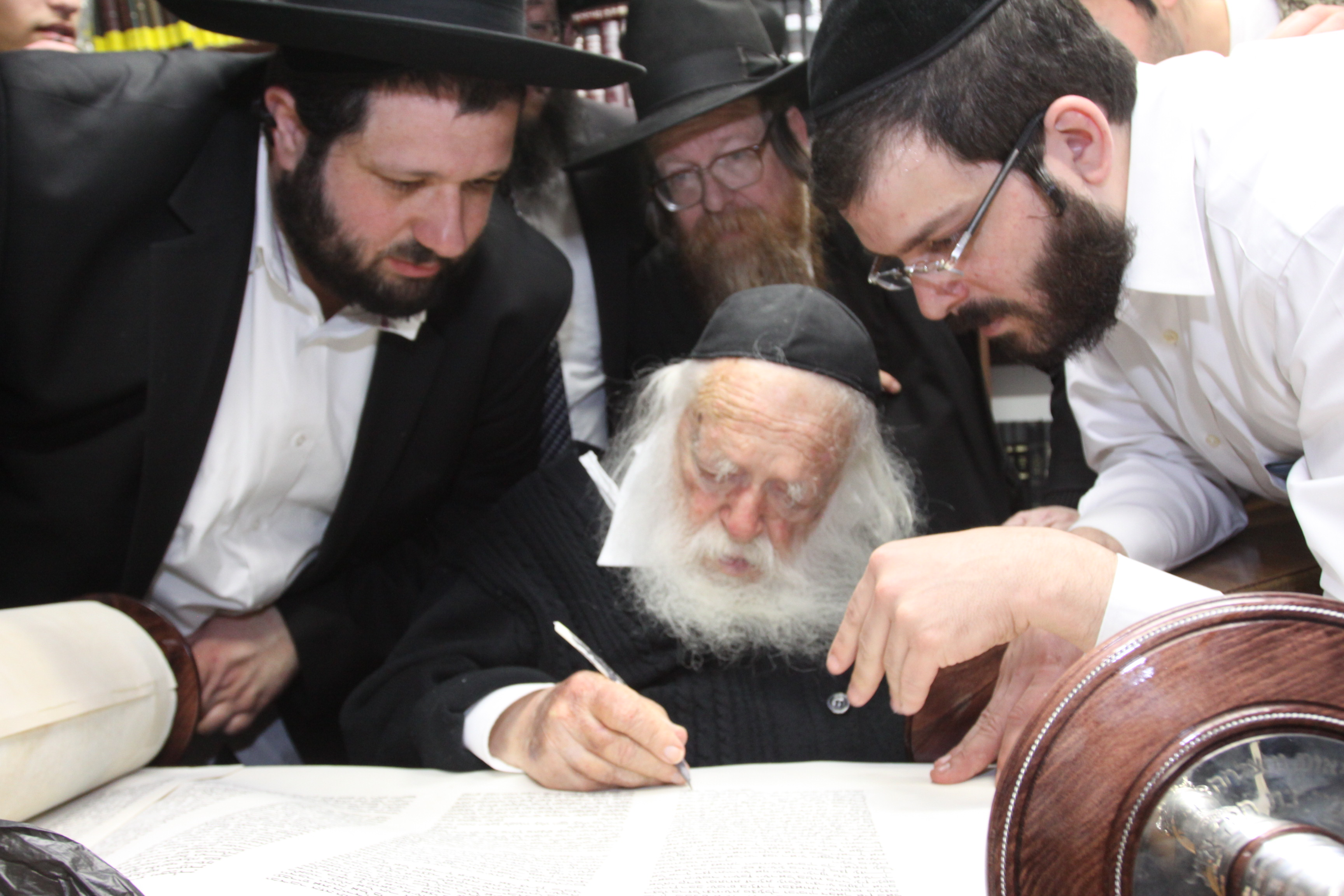
Rabbi Chaim Kanievsky writes the final letters in a new Torah scroll, 2014

If the Torah scroll is a new one, the event begins with a ceremony called siyum haTorah (completion of the Torah) or kesivas haosiyos (writing of the letters), in which the final letters at the end of the scroll are inked in by honorees. This ceremony usually takes place in the home of the one who is donating the scroll. The basis for this practice is a Talmudic teaching that whoever corrects one letter in a Torah scroll earns the same merit as one who writes an entire Torah scroll. It is considered a great honor to be selected for the writing of one of the last letters. Since most people are not professional scribes, many scribes outline the final letters beforehand for the honorees to fill in.

In Ashkenazi communities, the Torah scroll is then dressed in its mantle and sash, and adorned with its crown and a yad (pointer); in Sephardi communities, the scroll is placed in an ornamental wooden or silver case. Following the responsive reading of several verses, the procession begins.

=== Outdoor procession ===
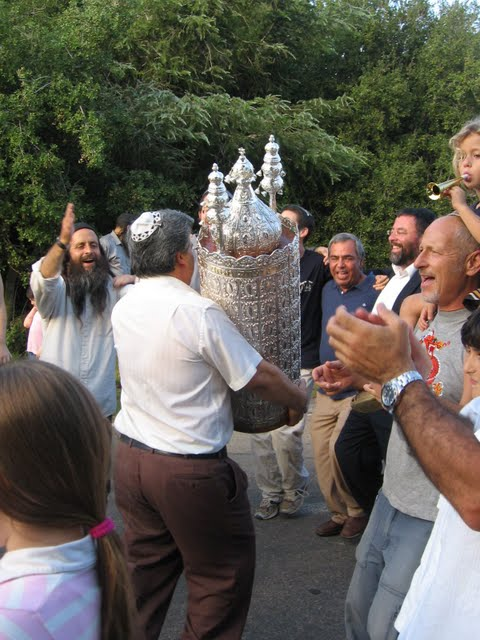
A Hachnasat Sefer Torah procession in Mitzpe Hila, 2009

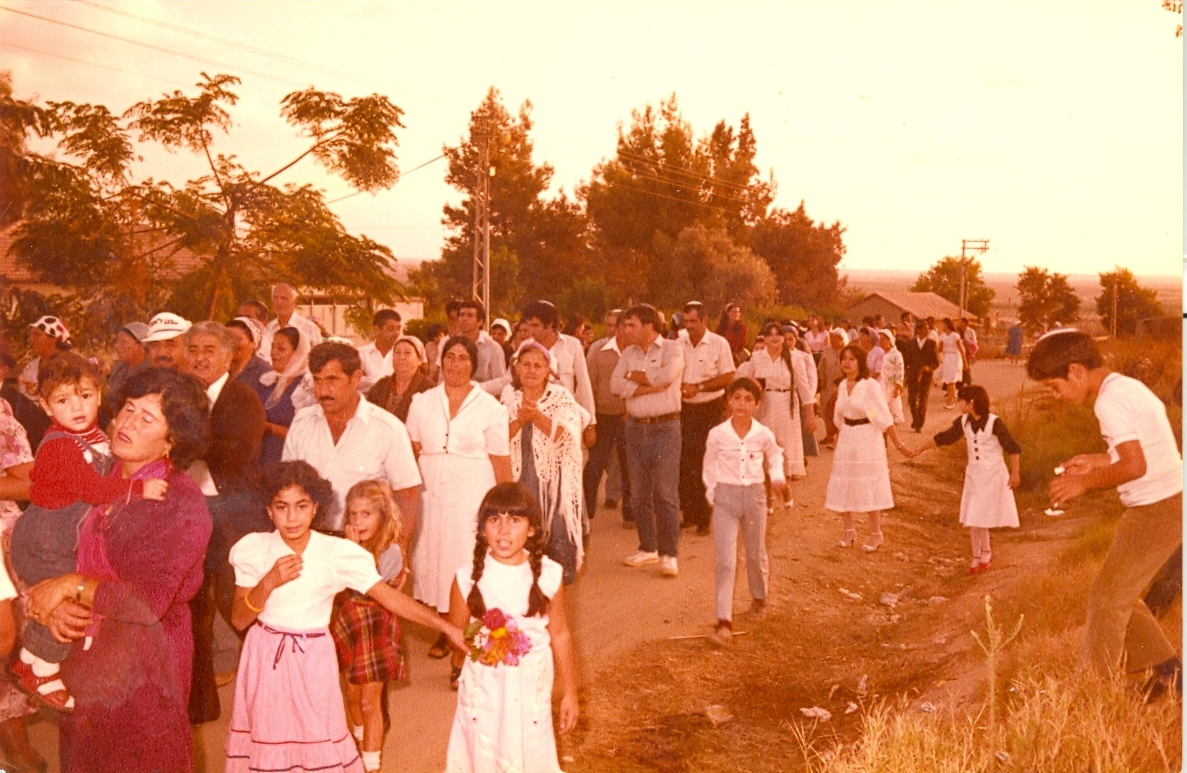
Members of Mlilot accompany the moshav's first Torah scroll to its new home, circa 1982

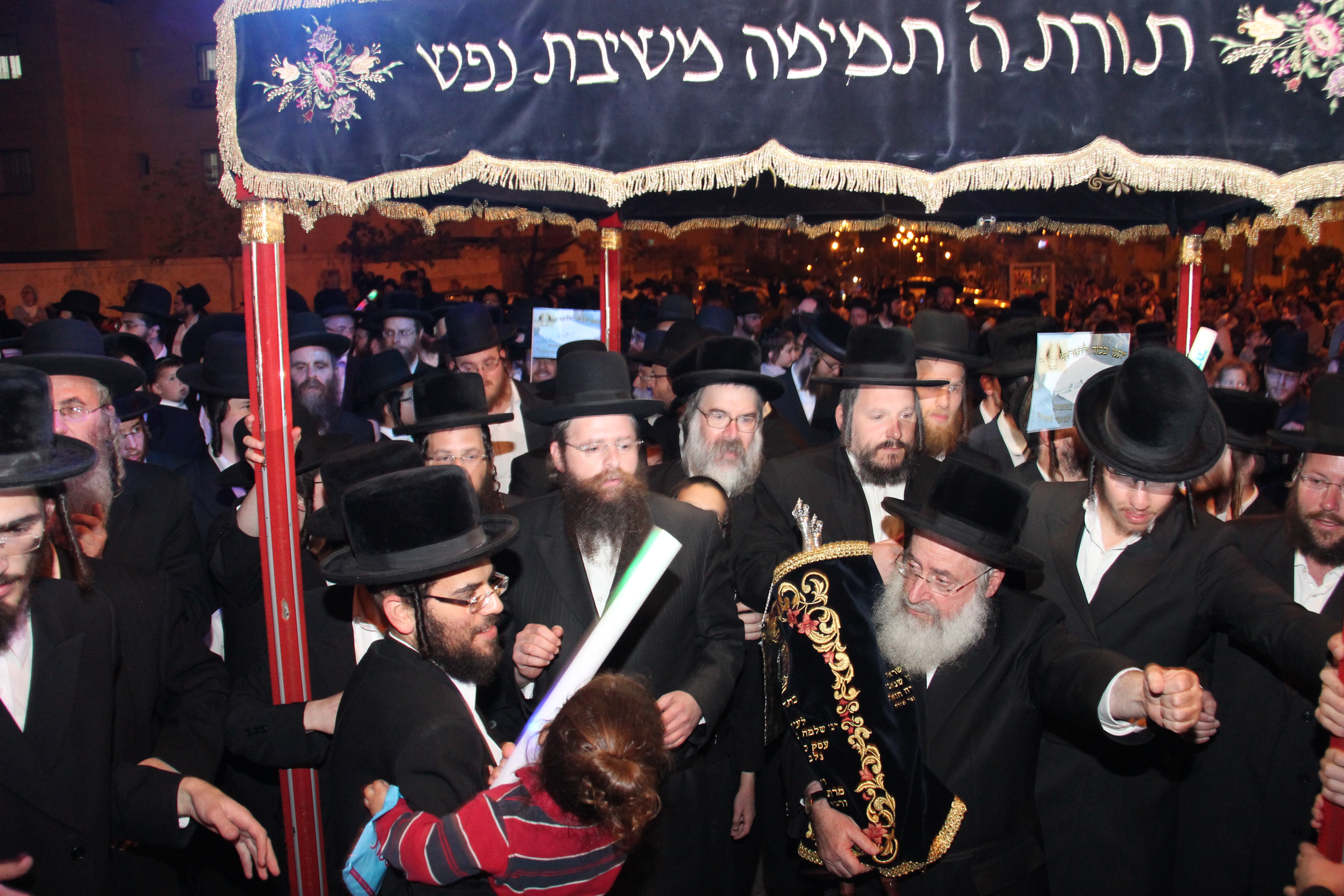
A nighttime procession in Beitar Illit, 2014

The Torah scroll is carried to its new home in an outdoor procession attended by men, women, and children. The procession can take place by day or by night. This event can attract hundreds and even thousands of participants.

The scroll or scrolls are carried under a chuppah (marriage canopy) as "acceptance of the Torah is seen as being analogous to a marriage with God". (Note: The marriage imagery is derived from the Midrash, which compares the giving of the Torah at Mount Sinai to a wedding: "Mount Sinai was the chuppah, the Jewish people the bride, the Almighty the groom, and the ring the Torah".) The chuppah may be as simple as a tallit supported by four poles, or a velvet canopy supported by poles.

The donor of the scroll, family members, friends, and other honorees take turns carrying the Torah scroll during the procession. School-age children often lead the procession with flags, candles or torches. All the youngsters in attendance receive a goodie bag sponsored by the donor.

Singing, dancing, and the playing of musical instruments traditionally accompany the procession. In early modern Italy, special poems were written in honor of the occasion. A 20th-century creation, the Hachnasat Sefer Torah Truck – sporting flashing lights, a sound system, and an oversized Torah crown on its roof – may drive at the head of the procession.

If the procession is being held on city streets, organizers must obtain a parade permit. Police cars often block off the parade route and accompany the celebrants as they move through the streets. A procession can take an hour or more, depending on the route that is chosen.

=== Inside the sanctuary ===
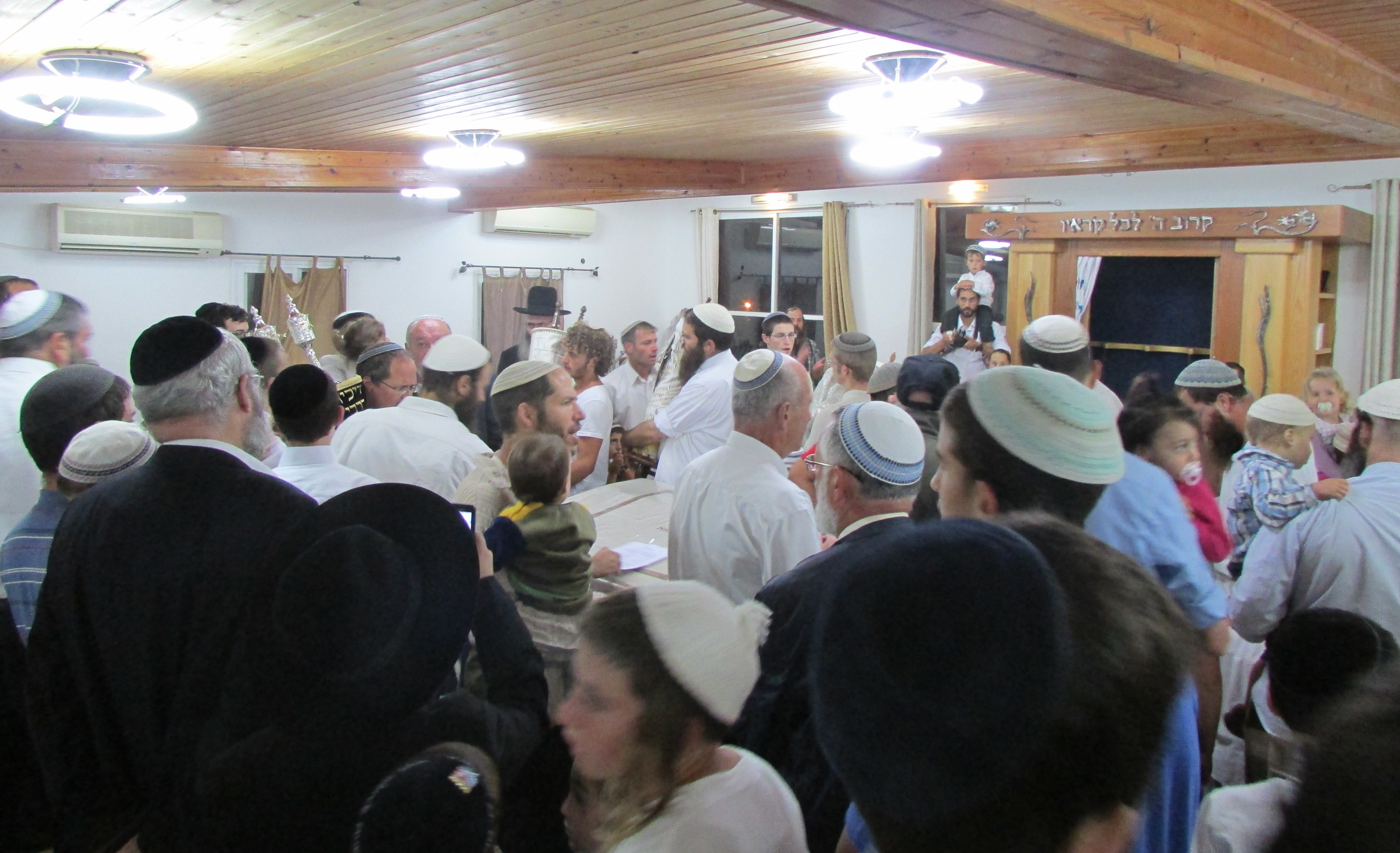
Dancing with the new Torah scroll and other Torah scrolls in a synagogue in Amona

When the procession nears the synagogue, yeshiva, or other destination, the other Torah scrolls that are already housed in the ark of the sanctuary are removed and carried outside to "welcome" the new scroll; then all the scrolls are carried inside together.

Inside the sanctuary, public prayers are recited in the style of Simchat Torah, beginning with the prayer Atah hareisa (You have been shown). Then the men and boys in attendance dance seven hakafot (circuits) around the reader's table while holding all the Torah scrolls, similar to the synagogue celebrations on Simchat Torah. Following this, the Torah scrolls that already belong to the sanctuary are returned to the ark and the new Torah scroll is placed on the reader's table. The donor of the scroll says the blessing of Shehecheyanu, both on the new scroll and on the new clothing that he wears in honor of the occasion. A Torah reader reads the final chapter of the Book of Deuteronomy (Deuteronomy 34:1–12) from the new scroll. The scroll is then placed in the ark amid more singing and dancing. The cantor then recites Psalm 24 with the traditional tune sung on Rosh Hashana and Yom Kippur, followed by the recital of additional verses, Aleinu, and the Mourner's Kaddish.

Everyone in attendance then sits down to a seudat mitzvah (festive meal) at which the Rav of the congregation and other Torah scholars discourse on subjects pertaining to the importance of the Torah, such as valuing Torah study, supporting Torah scholars and institutions, and living a Torah lifestyle.
