= Tushia =

Tushia: תושיה (Hebrew)
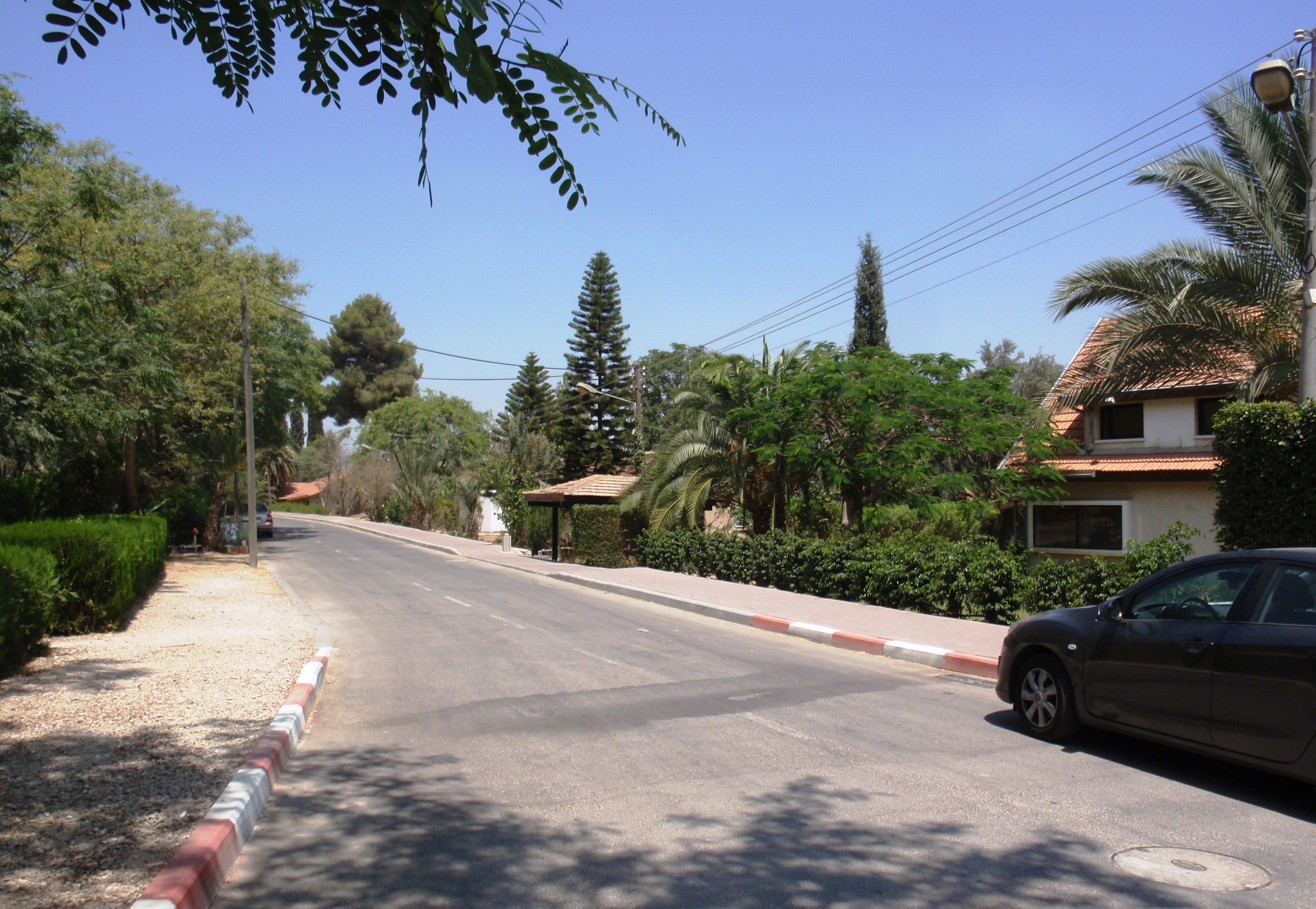
- Etymology: Wisdom
- Location within Northwest Negev region of Israel Location within Israel
- Coordinates: 31°26′0″N 34°32′25″E
- Country: Israel
- District: Southern
- Subdistrict: Beersheba
- Council: Sdot Negev
- Founded: 1958
- Founder: Yemenite Jews
- Population (2024): 473

Tushia (Hebrew: תושיה, lit. 'Wisdom') is a religious community settlement in southern Israel. Located around five kilometres from Netivot and east of Kfar Maimon, it falls under the jurisdiction of Sdot Negev Regional Council. In 2024 it had a population of 473.

== History ==
The village was established in 1958 and was initially named Shuva Heh, before adopting its current name, taken from the Book of Proverbs 2:7;

He layeth up sound wisdom for the upright, He is a shield to them that walk in integrity;
