= Shibolim =

Shibolim: שיבולים (Hebrew)
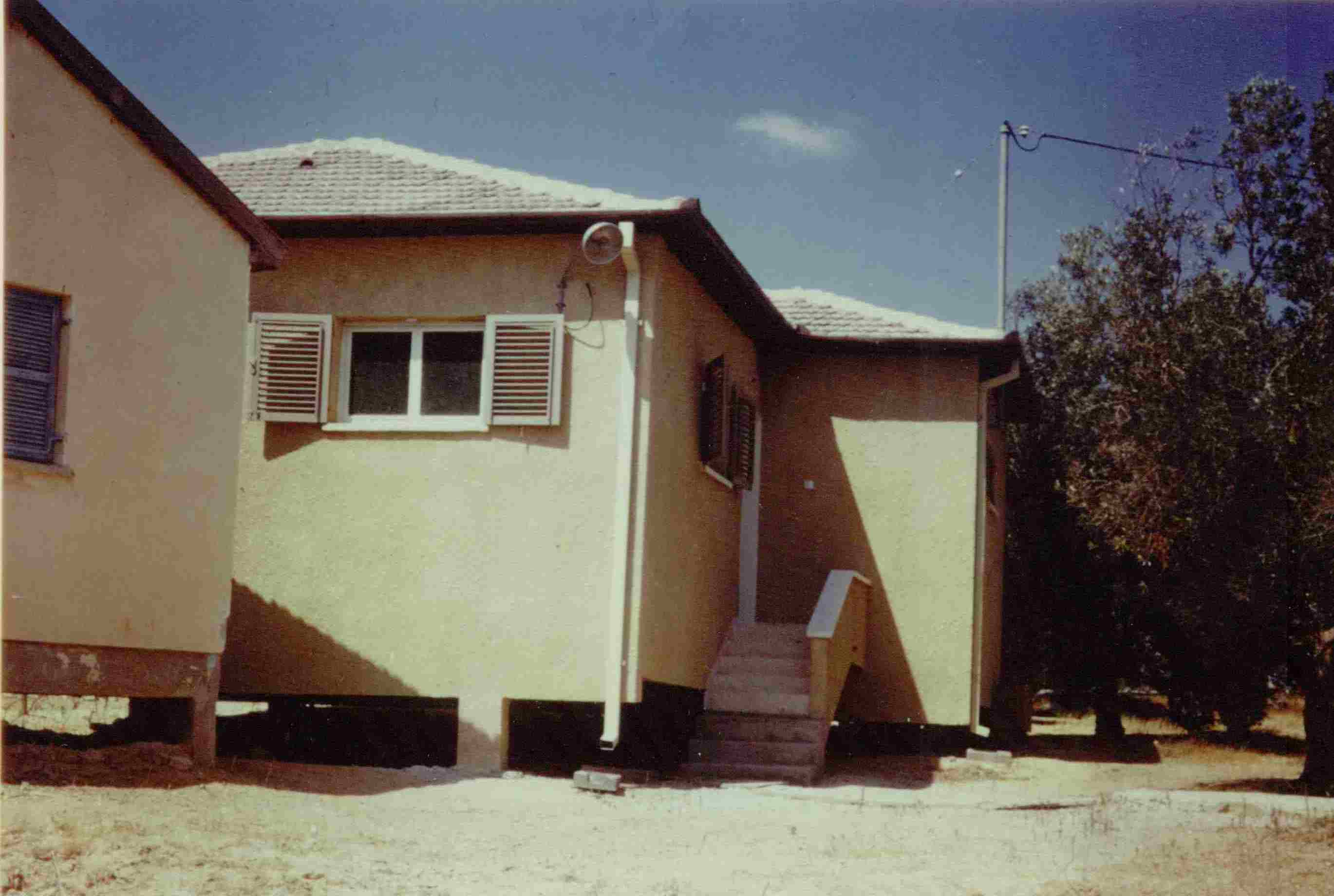
- Etymology: Ears
- Location within Northwest Negev region of Israel Location within Israel
- Coordinates: 31°23′45″N 34°36′28″E
- Country: Israel
- District: Southern
- Subdistrict: Beersheba
- Council: Sdot Negev
- Affiliation: Hapoel HaMizrachi
- Founded: 22 February 1952
- Founder: Kurdish and Persian Jews
- Area: 4,000 dunams (4.0 km^{2}; 1.5 sq mi)
- Population (2024): 431
  - Density: 110/km^{2} (280/sq mi)

Shibolim (Hebrew: שיבולים, lit. 'Ears') is a moshav in southern Israel, consisting of conservative and religious Jews. Located near Netivot and covering 4,000 dunams, it falls under the jurisdiction of Sdot Negev Regional Council. In 2024 it had a population of 431.

== History ==
The village was established on 22 February 1952 by immigrants from Iran and Kurdistan, who had previously been living in Yakhini. It was initially named Sharsheret Bet, before adopting its current name, taken from the Tanakh. Notable residents include Eliezer Avtabi, a member of the Knesset for the National Religious Party.
