= Eliezer Avtabi =

Israeli politician

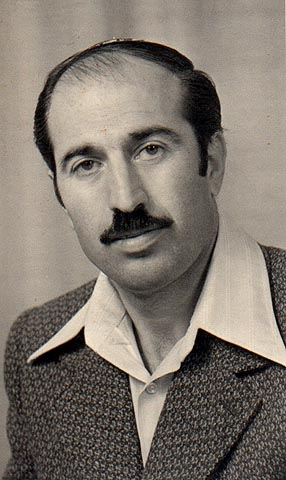
- Avtabi during his time in the Knesset

Faction represented in the Knesset
- 1974–1984: National Religious Party

Personal details
- Born: 5 January 1938 (age 88) Takab, Iran

Eliezer Avtabi (Hebrew: אליעזר אבטבי; born 5 January 1938) is an Israeli former politician who served as a member of the Knesset for the National Religious Party between 1974 and 1984.

== Biography ==
Born in Takab in Iran, Avtabi emigrated to Israel in 1950. He joined moshav Shibolim, and was a member of Hapoel HaMizrachi moshav movement. He became deputy chairman of Azata Regional Council, and was a member of the directorate of Negev Regional Factories.

In 1973 he was elected to the Knesset on the National Religious Party list, taking his seat in 1974. He was re-elected in 1977 and 1981, before losing his seat in the 1984 elections.
