= Givolim =

Moshav in southern Israel

Givolim: גבעולים (Hebrew)
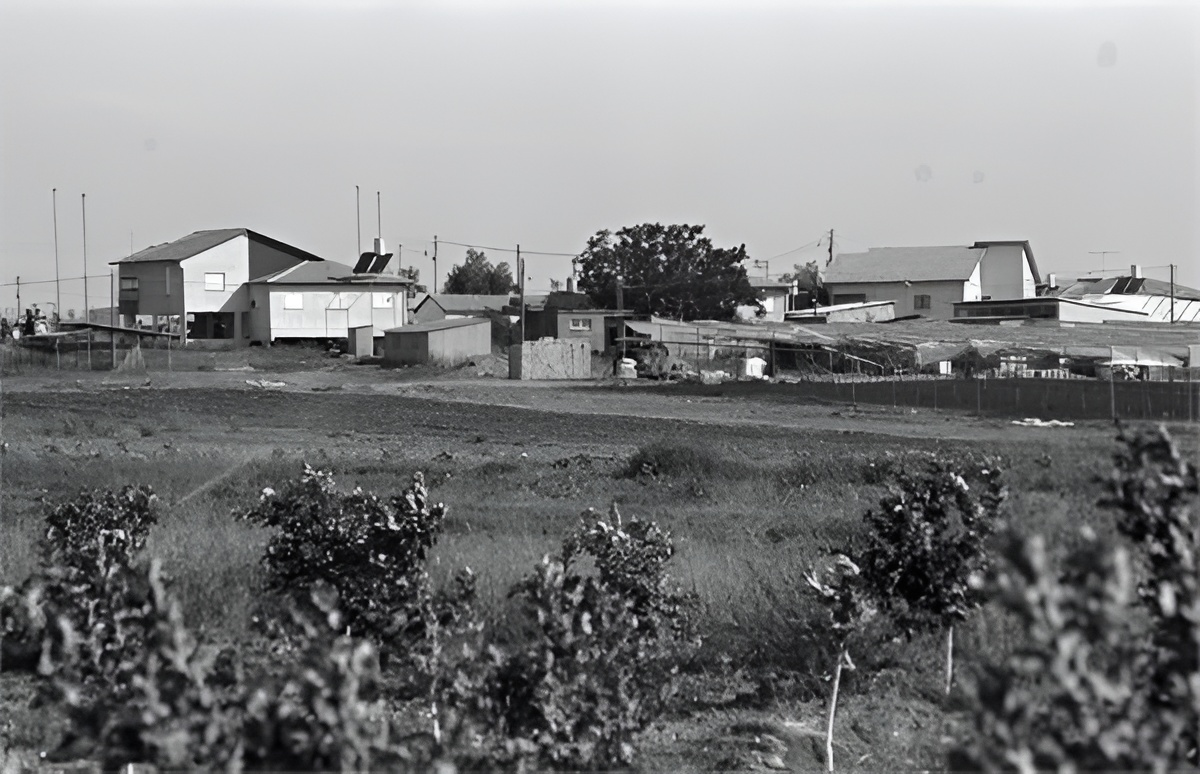
- Etymology: Stalks
- Location within Northwest Negev region of Israel Location within Israel
- Coordinates: 31°23′48″N 34°35′29″E
- Country: Israel
- District: Southern
- Subdistrict: Beersheba
- Council: Sdot Negev
- Affiliation: Hapoel HaMizrachi
- Founded: 1952
- Founder: Iraqi and Kurdish Jews
- Population (2024): 560

Givolim (Hebrew: גבעולים, lit. 'Stalks') is a religious moshav in southern Israel. Located near Netivot and covering 3,000 dunams, it falls under the jurisdiction of Sdot Negev Regional Council. In 2024 it had a population of 560.

== History ==
The village was established in 1952 by Jewish immigrants from Iraq and Kurdistan.
