= Ma'agalim =

Community settlement in southern Israel

Ma'agalim: מעגלים (Hebrew)
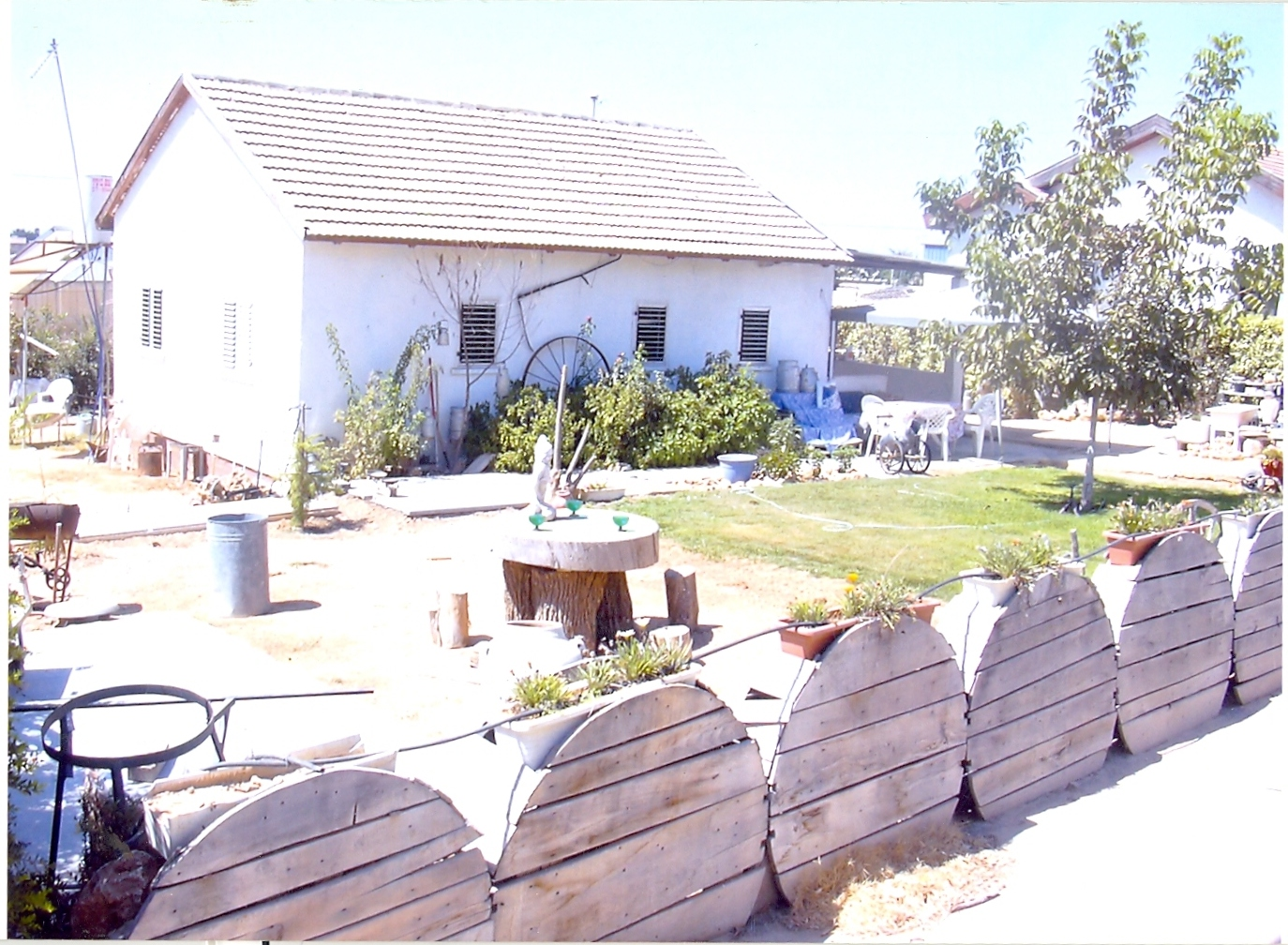
- Etymology: Paths
- Location within Northwest Negev region of Israel Location within Israel
- Coordinates: 31°23′48″N 34°35′56″E
- Country: Israel
- District: Southern
- Subdistrict: Beersheba
- Council: Sdot Negev
- Founded: 1958
- Founder: Iranian, Iraqi and Tunisian immigrants
- Population (2024): 1,322

Ma'agalim (Hebrew: מעגלים, lit. 'Paths') is a national-religious community settlement in southern Israel. Located south of Netivot, it falls under the jurisdiction of Sdot Negev Regional Council. In 2024 it had a population of 1,322.

== History ==
The village was established in 1958 and its name was taken from the Book of Psalms 65:11;

Thou crownest the year with Thy goodness; and Thy paths drop fatness.

== Gallery ==
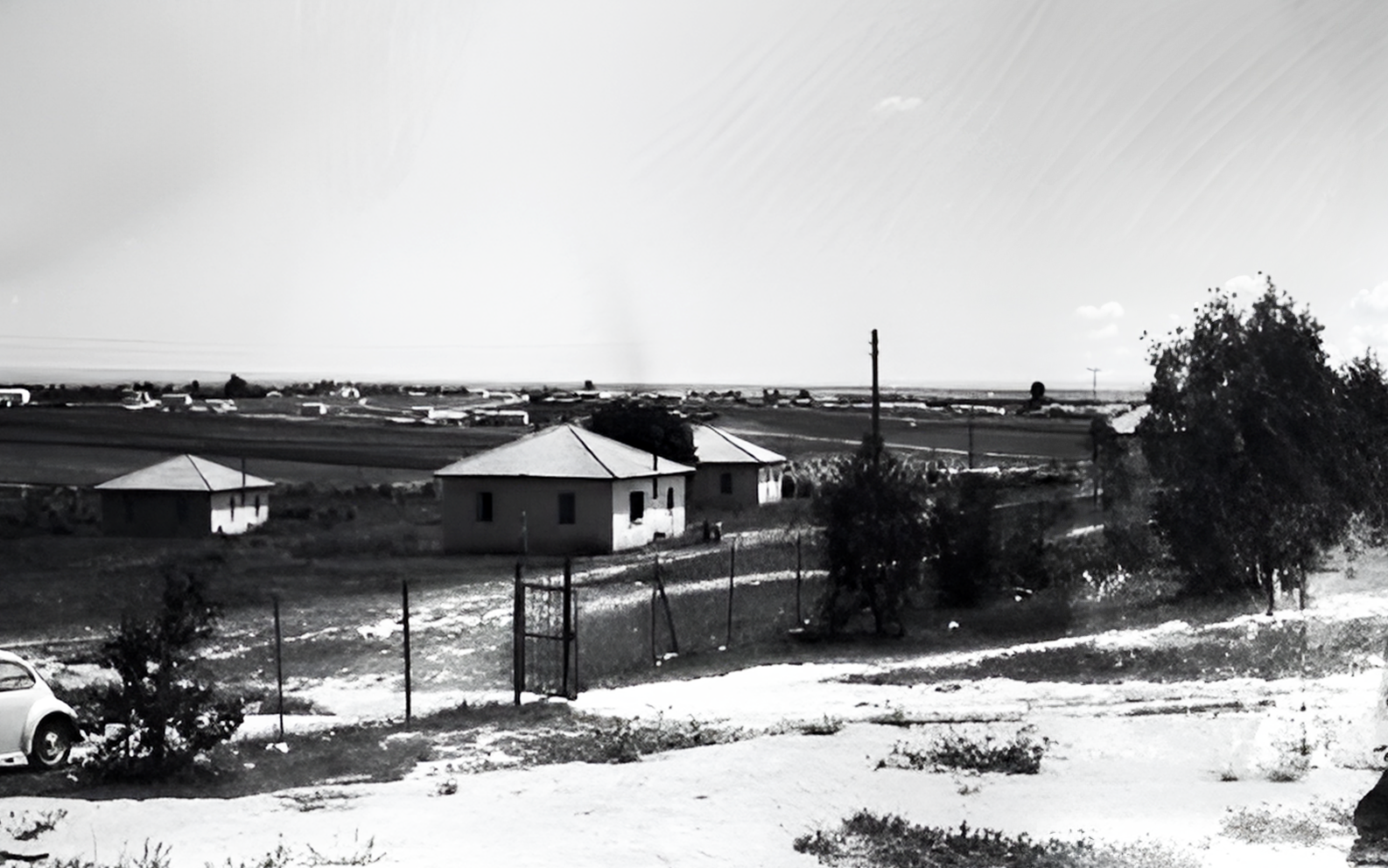
Ma'agalim 1966

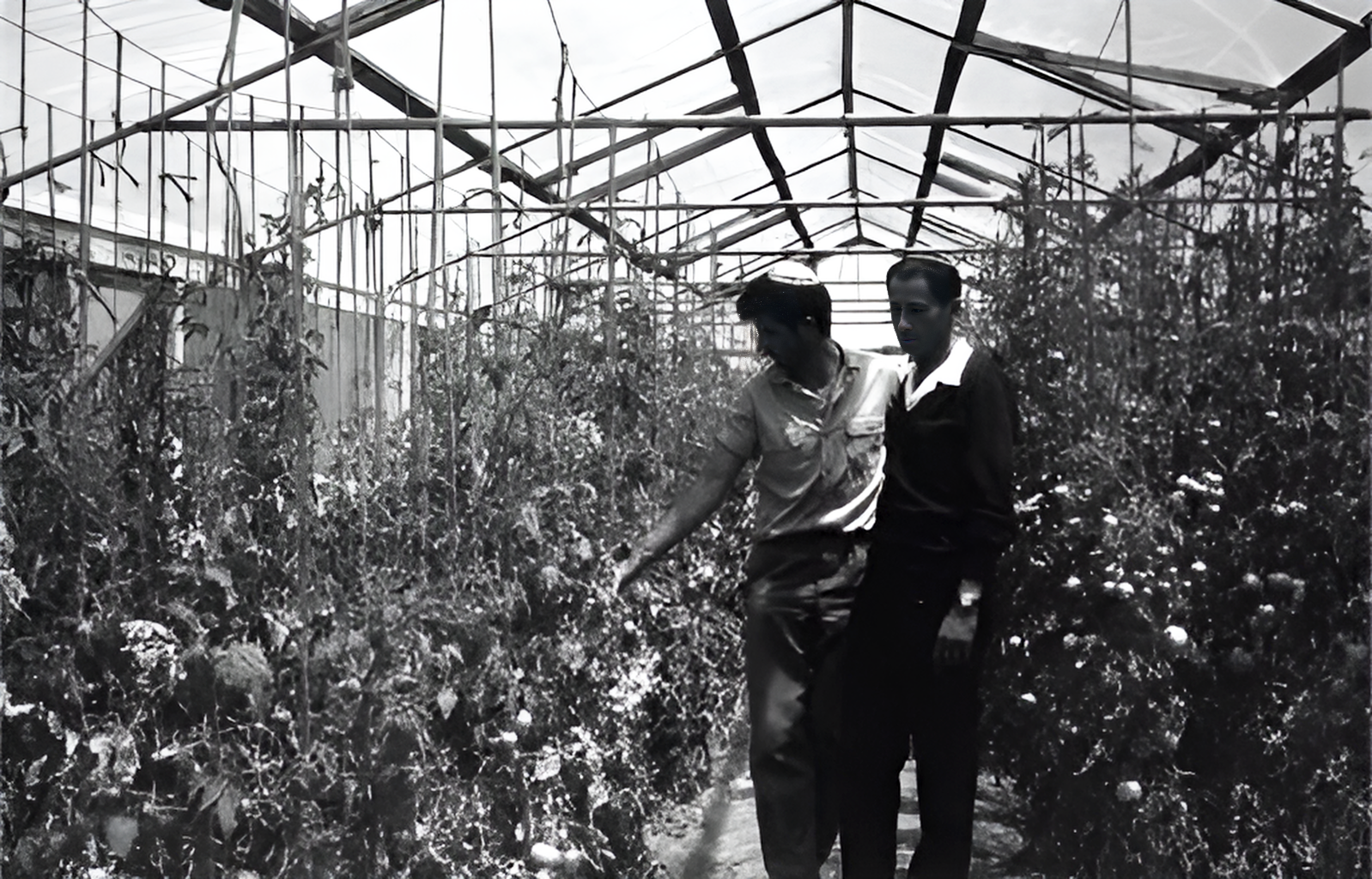
Tomato greenhouse in Ma'agalim, 1966

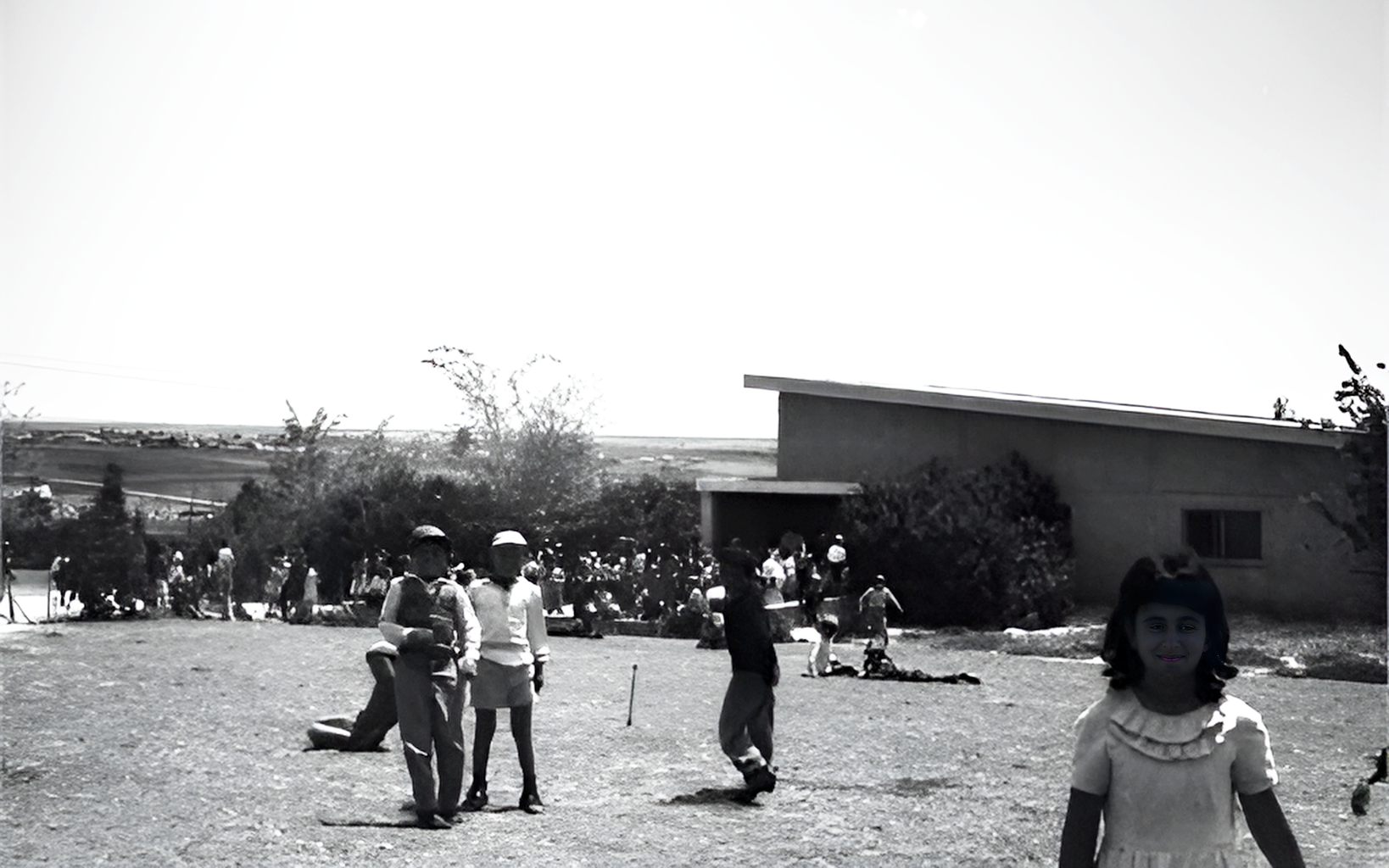
Children in Ma'agalim, 1966
