= Yoshivia =

Yoshivia: יושיביה (Hebrew)
- Location within Northwest Negev region of Israel Location within Israel
- Coordinates: 31°26′35″N 34°36′36″E
- Country: Israel
- District: Southern
- Subdistrict: Beersheba
- Council: Sdot Negev
- Affiliation: Hapoel HaMizrachi
- Founded: 1950
- Founder: Algerian Jews
- Population (2024): 810

Yoshivia (Hebrew: יושיביה) is a religious moshav in southern Israel. Located near Netivot, it falls under the jurisdiction of Sdot Negev Regional Council. In 2024 it had a population of 810.

== History ==
The village was established in 1950 by immigrants from Algeria, at a site south of the abandoned Arab village of al-Muharraqa. It was named after Yoel Ben Yoshivia, a member of the Tribe of Simeon which lived in the area and mentioned in 1 Chronicles 4:35;

and Joel, and Jehu the son of Joshibiah, the son of Seraiah, the son of Asiel;
