= Beit HaGadi =

Moshav in southern Israel

Beit HaGadi: בית הגדי (Hebrew)
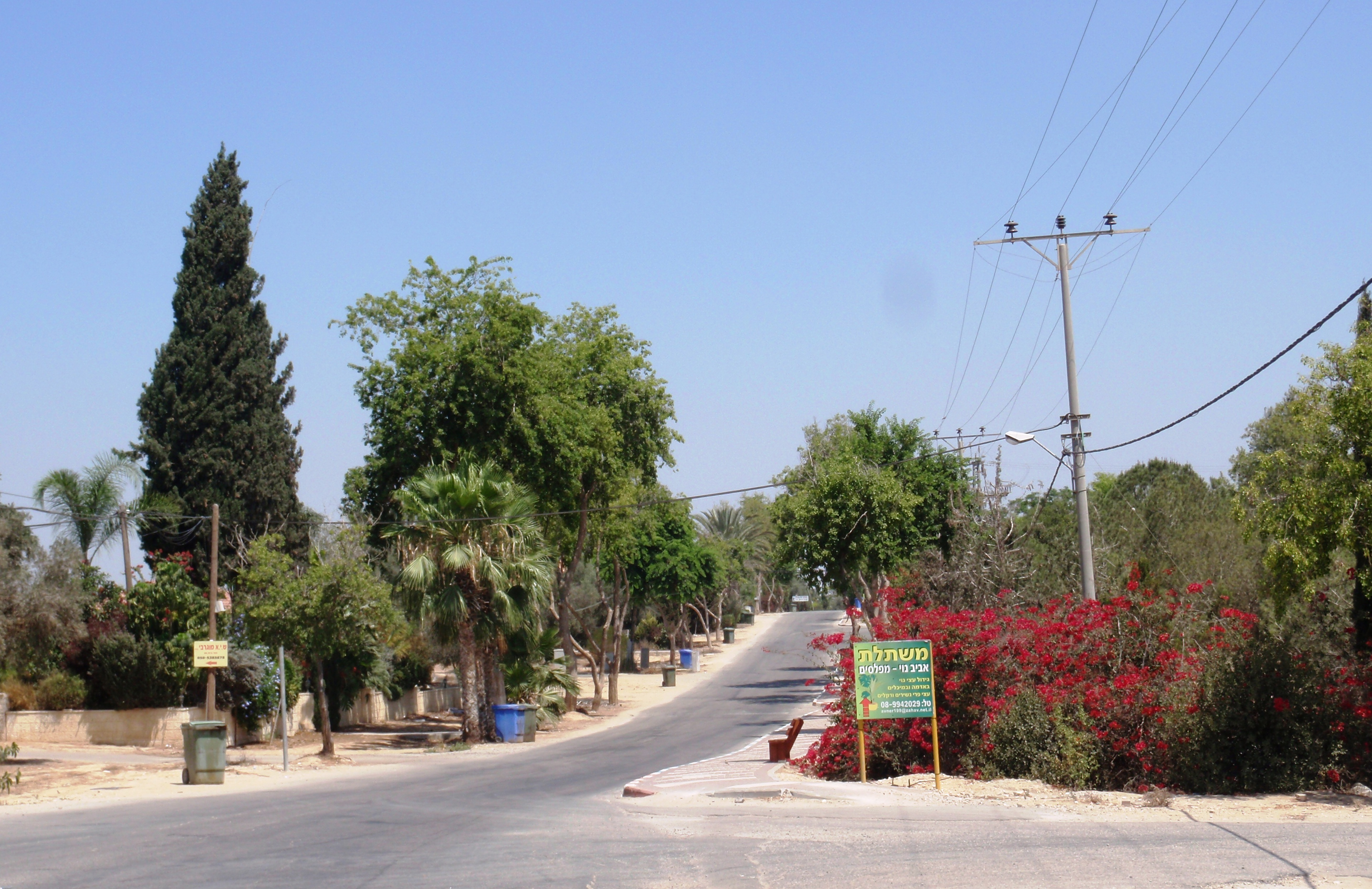
- Etymology: House of the Gad
- Location within Northwest Negev region of Israel Location within Israel
- Coordinates: 31°25′28″N 34°36′22″E
- Country: Israel
- District: Southern
- Subdistrict: Beersheba
- Council: Sdot Negev
- Affiliation: Hapoel HaMizrachi
- Founded: 1951
- Founder: Hungarian and Romanian Jews
- Population (2024): 1,146

Beit HaGadi (Hebrew: בית הגדי, lit. 'House of the Gad') is a religious moshav in southern Israel. Located near Netivot and the Gaza Strip, it falls under the jurisdiction of Sdot Negev Regional Council. In 2024 it had a population of 1,146.

== History ==
The village was established in 1951, and was initially named Beit HaGide'a. The founders were demobilised IDF soldiers who were members of Netiv BeMoledet organisation and Hapoel HaMizrachi. They were immigrants from Hungary and Romania, and had previously worked in Rishon LeZion.

In the 1980s and 1990s, a yeshiva called 'Orot HaNegev' was held there, headed by Rabbi Simcha Stettner and Rabbi Yehuda Halevi Amichai.

At the beginning of the 21st century, a new neighborhood was established in Moshav as part of a community expansion.

Its name is taken from the Tribe of Gad, which lived in the area in biblical times, and the Bedouin village of Bit Hajadaa that appears on the Madaba Map.
