= First Step to Nobel Prize in Physics =

The First Step to Nobel Prize in Physics is an annual international competition in research projects in physics. It originated and is based in Poland.

== Participants ==
All the secondary high school students regardless of the country, type of the school, sex, nationality etc. are eligible for the competition. The only conditions are that the school cannot be considered as a university college and the age of the participants should not exceed 20 years on March 31 (every year March 31 is the deadline for submitting the competition papers). There are no restrictions concerning the subject matter of the papers, their level, methods applied etc. All these are left to the participants' choice. The papers, however, have to have a research character and deal with physics topics or topics directly related to physics. The papers are evaluated by the Evaluating Committee, which is nominated by the Organizing Committee. It was recently won by David Rosengarten.

== History ==
In the first two competitions, only Polish physicists participated in the Evaluation Committee. In the third competition, one non-Polish judge took part in evaluation of the papers. In the fourth competition, the number of physicists from other countries was 10, with 14 being present in the fifth competition. Plans are in place to increase the number of physicists involved from other countries in future competitions. An International Advisory Committee (IAC) was also established. At present, it consists of 25 physicists from different countries.

== Competition and evaluation ==
The materials on the competition are disseminated to all the countries via diplomatic channels. The competition is also advertised in different physics magazines for pupils and teachers. (Every year about 30 articles on the First Step are published in different countries). Also, different private channels are used. In the first eight competitions the pupils from 67 countries participated.

The criteria used when evaluating the papers submitted are geared towards an adult standard; no special consideration is given for the younger age of the participants. There are no prizes such as would be seen in other school-based competitions (cameras, electronics, financial rewards, etc.). Instead, the winners are invited to the Institute for one month for research stays (usually in November). During the stays, they are involved into real research works going on in the Institute. Each year the proceedings with all of the awarded papers are published.

== Goals ==
The competition has several aims and interests, which include:

- Promotion of scientific interests among young pupils.
- Selection of outstanding pupils (this point is especially important in case of pupils from countries or regions in which access to science is difficult) and their promotion (very often winners are sent to better universities and receive appropriate financial help from the local authorities).
- Stimulation of the schools, parents, local educational centers, etc. for greater activity in work with pupils interested in research (in some countries, some regions and even in some schools a preliminary local selection in organized, sometime such selections involve great numbers of participants)
- Establishing friendly relations between young physicists (in recent competitions, all winners were invited to the Institute at the same time, were accommodated in the same place, and cooperated with each other).

== Winners ==
In 2007, the winner was an American student. In 2009, the prize went to Mor Tzaban, a high school student from Netivot, Israel. In 2012, the first prize winner was another Israeli teenager, Yuval Katzenelson of Kiryat Gat, who presented a paper entitled "Kinetic energy of inert gas in a regenerative system of activated carbon." The Israeli delegation won 14 more prizes in the competition: 9 Israelis students won second prize, one won third prize and one won fourth prize.

== See also ==
- List of physics awards
