= Shokeda =

Shokeda: שוקדה (Hebrew)
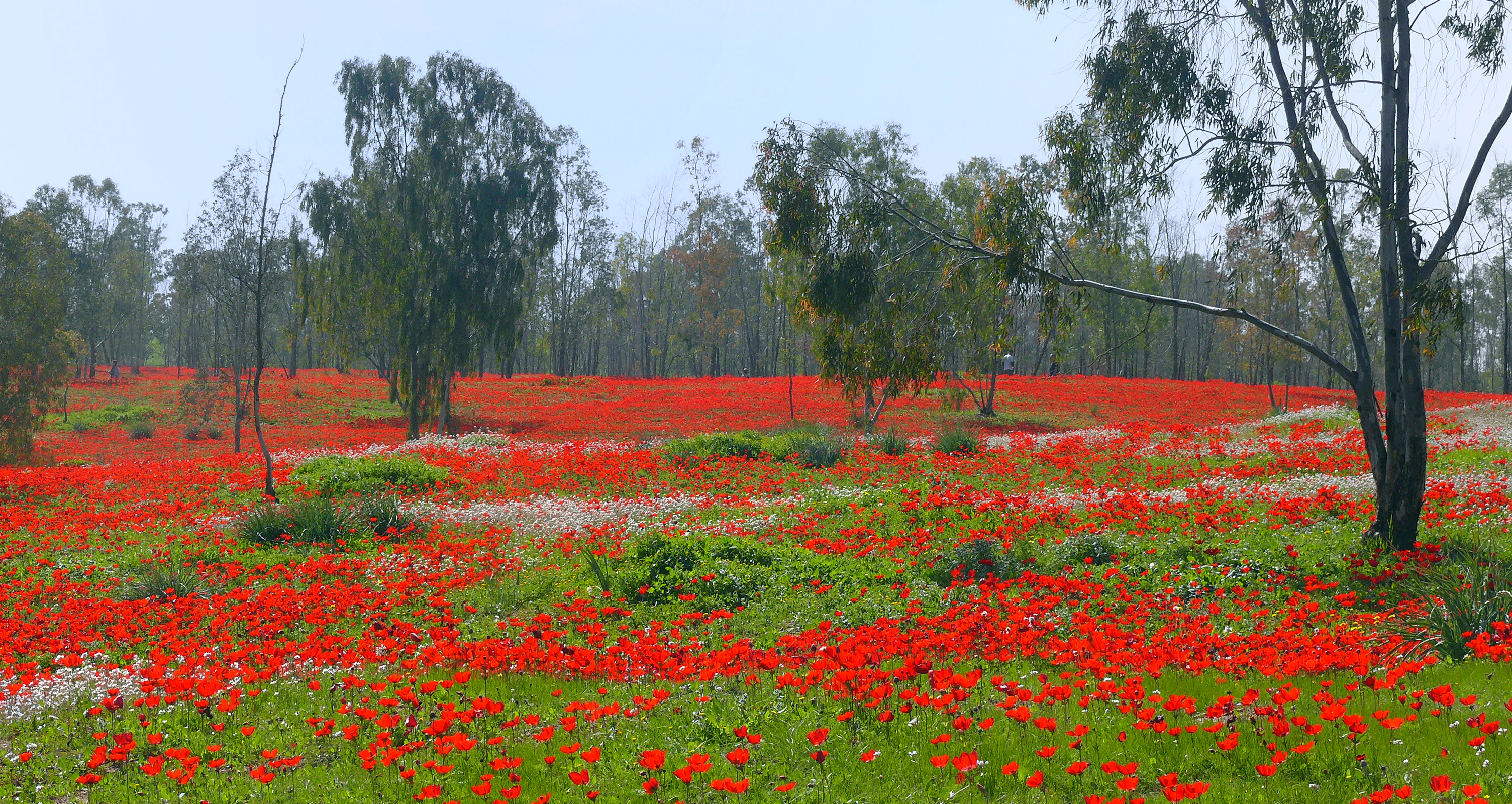
- Anemone coronaria blossom at Shokeda forest.

- Location within Northwest Negev region of Israel Location within Israel
- Coordinates: 31°25′20″N 34°31′29″E
- Country: Israel
- District: Southern
- Subdistrict: Beersheba
- Council: Sdot Negev
- Affiliation: Hapoel HaMizrachi
- Founded: 1957
- Founder: Moroccan Jews
- Population (2024): 769

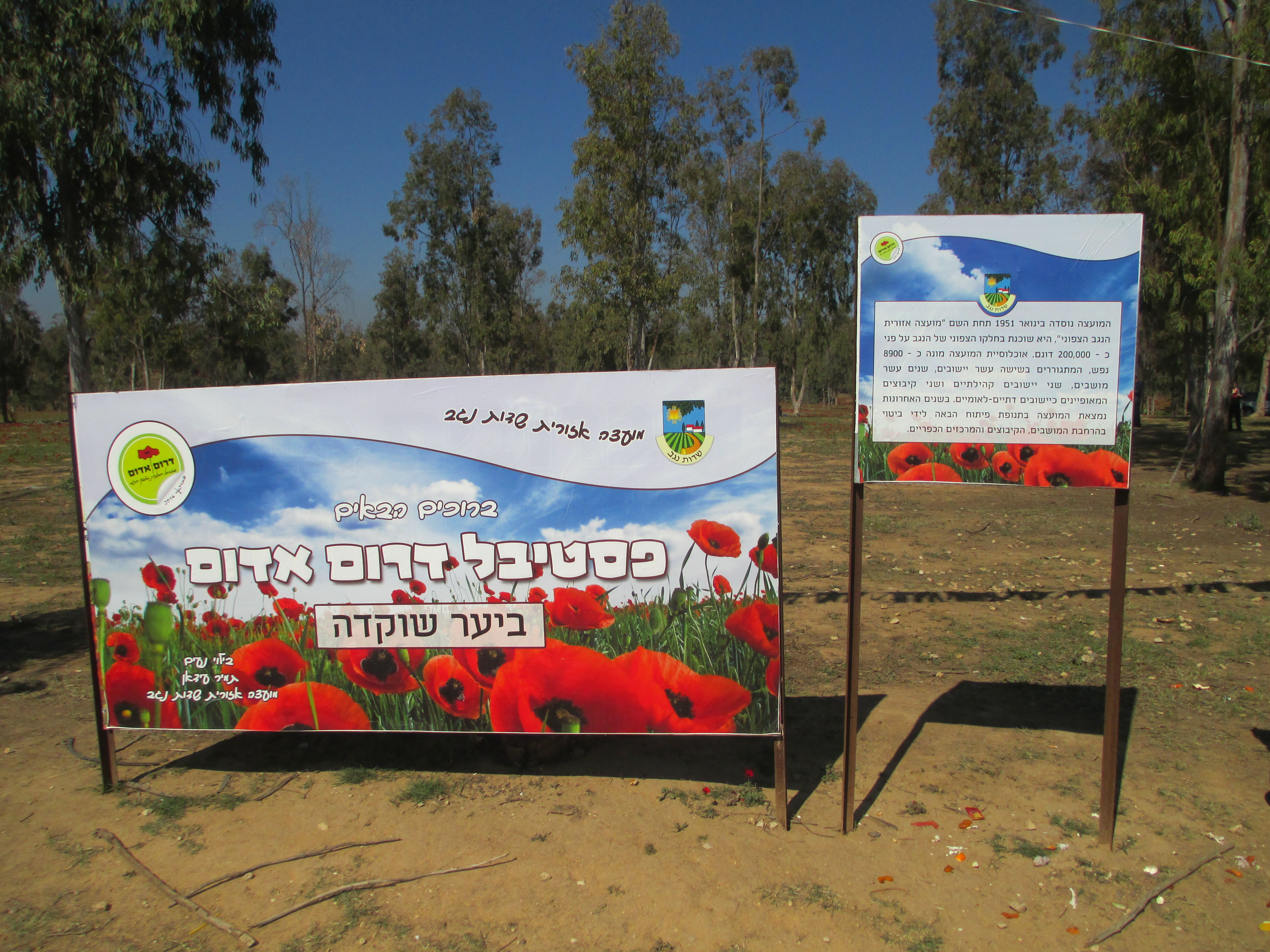
Shokeda

Shokeda (Hebrew: שוקדה) is a religious moshav in southern Israel. Located approximately six kilometres west of Netivot and covering 6,000 dunams, it falls under the jurisdiction of Sdot Negev Regional Council. In 2024 it had a population of 769.

== History ==
The village was established in 1957 by the Jewish Agency for Moroccan Jewish immigrants. They arrived in two groups, and the original aim was to found two settlements; Shokeda and Tzumha. However, only one of them was established.

In the late winter months, Shokeda becomes a tourist attraction due to the multitude of wild red poppy flowers that carpet the landscape.

== See also ==
- Wildlife of Israel
