= Sdot Negev Regional Council =

Regional council in Israel

Coordinates: 31°25′N 34°33′E

Sdot Negev Regional Council מועצה אזורית שדות נגב مجلس إقليمي سدوت نقب
- Regional council
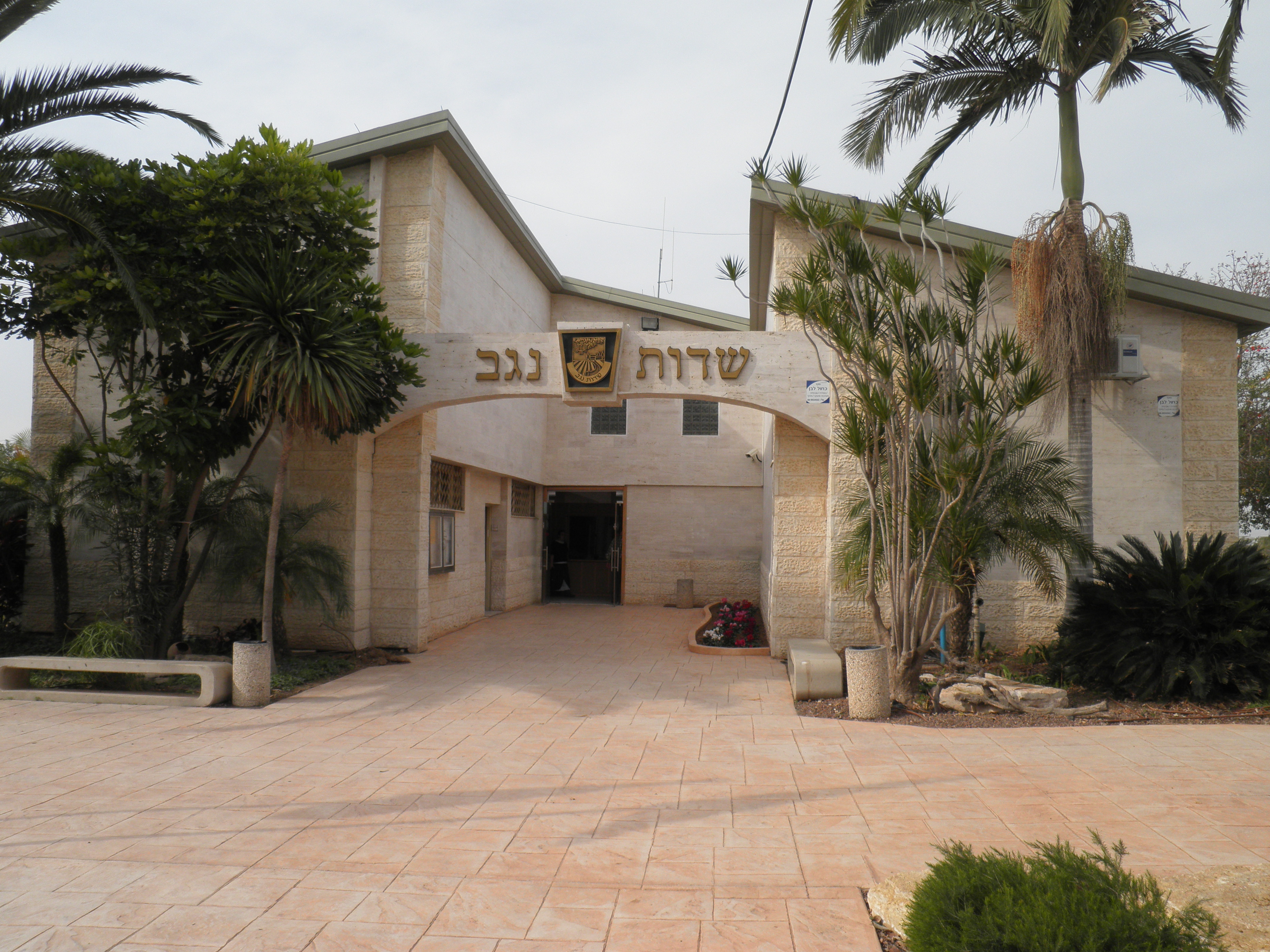

- Interactive map of Sdot Negev Regional Council
- Country: Israel
- District: Southern
- Subdistrict: Beersheba
- Natural region: Gerar (mostly), Besor (one village
- Established: 1951

Government
  - Head of Municipality: Tamir Idan

Area
  - Total: 117,350 dunams (117.35 km^{2}; 45.31 sq mi)

Population (2024)
  - Total: 12,779
  - Density: 108.90/km^{2} (282.04/sq mi)
- Website: www.sdotnegev.org.il

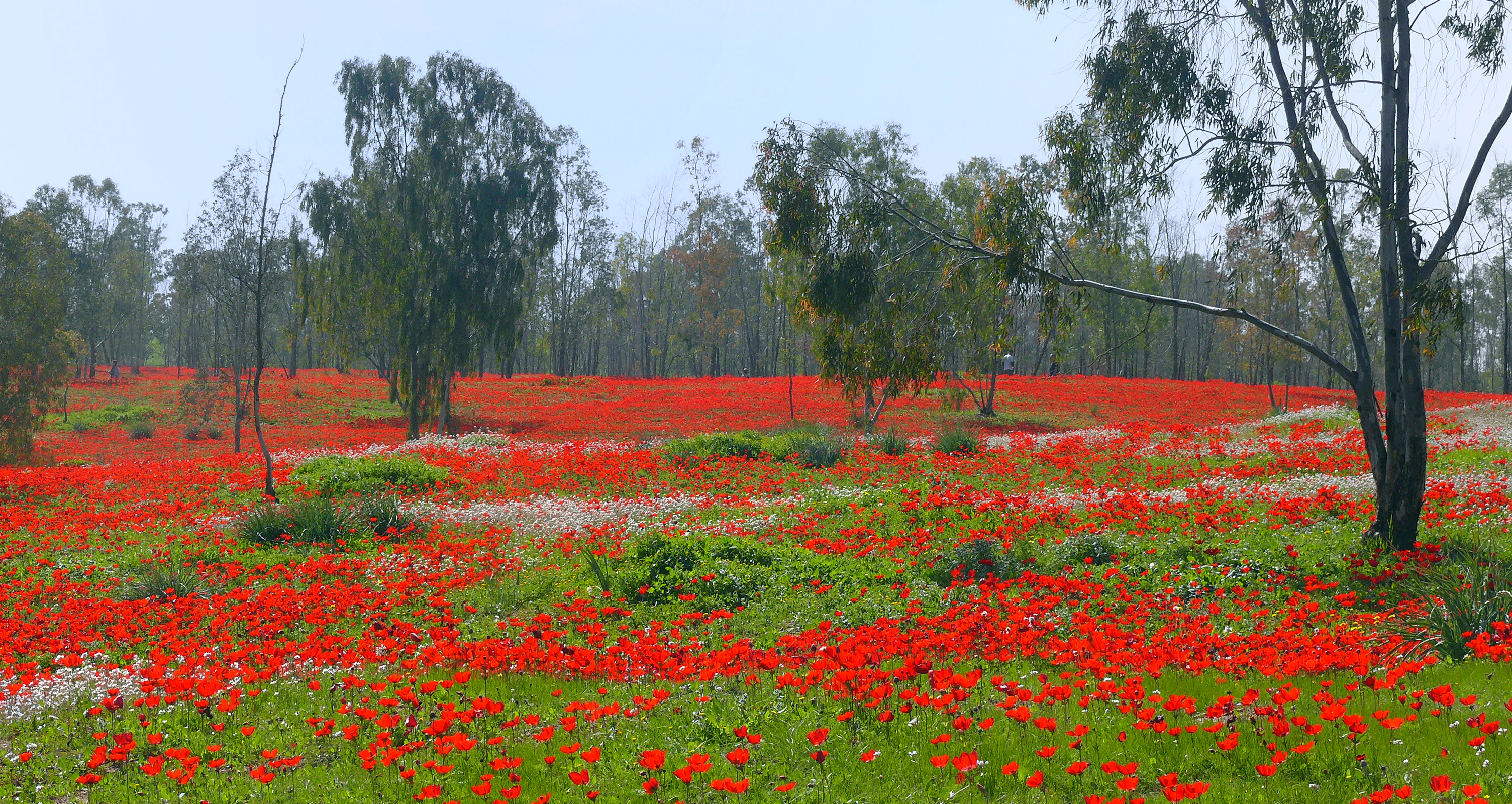
Shokeda forest, under the jurisdiction of the Sdot Negev Regional Council, 2012

Sdot Negev Regional Council (Hebrew: מועצה אזורית שדות נגב, Mo'atza Azorit Sdot Negev, lit. Negev Fields Regional Council), formerly Azata Regional Council (Hebrew: מועצה אזורית עזתה, Mo'atza Azorit Azata), is a regional council in the northwestern Negev desert in the Southern District of Israel. It surrounds the city of Netivot.

== History ==
The Sdot Negev region council was established in 1951 by the Religious Zionist HaPoel HaMizrahi settlement movement. The council encompasses 16 communities: two kibbutzim, 12 moshavim and two community settlements.

Despite frequent rocket attacks from the nearby Gaza Strip, the population of the Sdot Negev region has increased 55 percent in 2006–2012. Residents have cited the educational system, atmosphere and rural lifestyle as incentives for moving to this part of the Negev.

== List of communities ==
Kibbutzim:

- Alumim
- Sa'ad

Moshavim:

- Beit HaGadi
- Givolim
- Kfar Maimon
- Mlilot
- Sharsheret
- Shibolim
- Shokeda
- Shuva
- Tkuma
- Yoshivia
- Zru'a
- Zimrat

Community settlements:

- Ma'agalim
- Tushia

== Demographics ==
Historical population
Year	Pop.	±%
1972	5,100	—
1983	5,000	−2.0%
1995	5,400	+8.0%
2008	7,690	+42.4%
2022	11,589	+50.7%
2024	12,779	+10.3%

== Voting Patterns ==
In the 2022 election, 90 percent of voters in the regional council voted for the parties of the right-wing coalition led by Benjamin Netanyahu, while 10 percent voted for the parties of the center-left coalition led by Yair Lapid and no votes were cast for the Arab parties.

In the 2026 election, 80 percent of voters in the regional council voted for the parties of the right-wing coalition led by Benjamin Netanyahu, while 11 percent voted for the parties of the center-left coalition led by Gadi Eisenkot and 0.1 percent voted for the Arab parties. An additional 2.3 percent voted for the Reservists, and 5.9 percent voted for Amcha Yisrael. Voter turnout increased 16 percent from the 2022 election.
