= Zru'a =

Zru'a: זרועה (Hebrew)
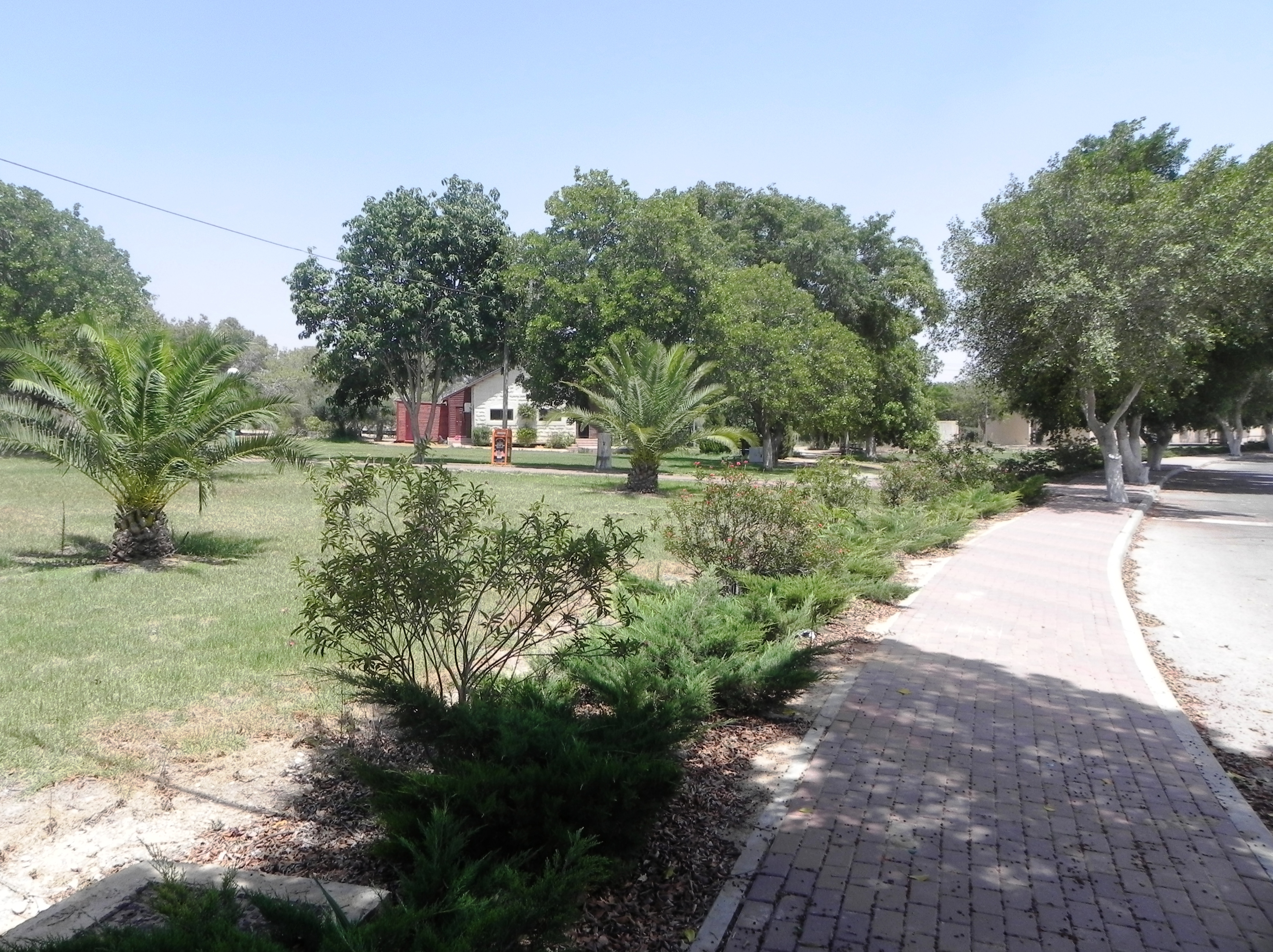
- Etymology: Sown
- Location within Northwest Negev region of Israel Location within Israel
- Coordinates: 31°27′30″N 34°37′29″E
- Country: Israel
- District: Southern
- Subdistrict: Beersheba
- Council: Sdot Negev
- Affiliation: Hapoel HaMizrachi
- Founded: 1953
- Founder: Moroccan Jews
- Population (2024): 544

Zru'a (Hebrew: זרועה, lit. 'Sown') is a religious moshav in southern Israel. Located near Netivot, it falls under the jurisdiction of Sdot Negev Regional Council. In 2024 it had a population of 544.

== History ==
The village was established in 1953 by immigrants from Morocco. Its name is taken from the Book of Jeremiah 2:2;

Go, and cry in the ears of Jerusalem, saying: Thus saith the LORD: I remember for thee the affection of thy youth, the love of thine espousals; how thou wentest after Me in the wilderness, in a land that was not sown.
