= Zimrat =

Zimrat: זמרת (Hebrew)
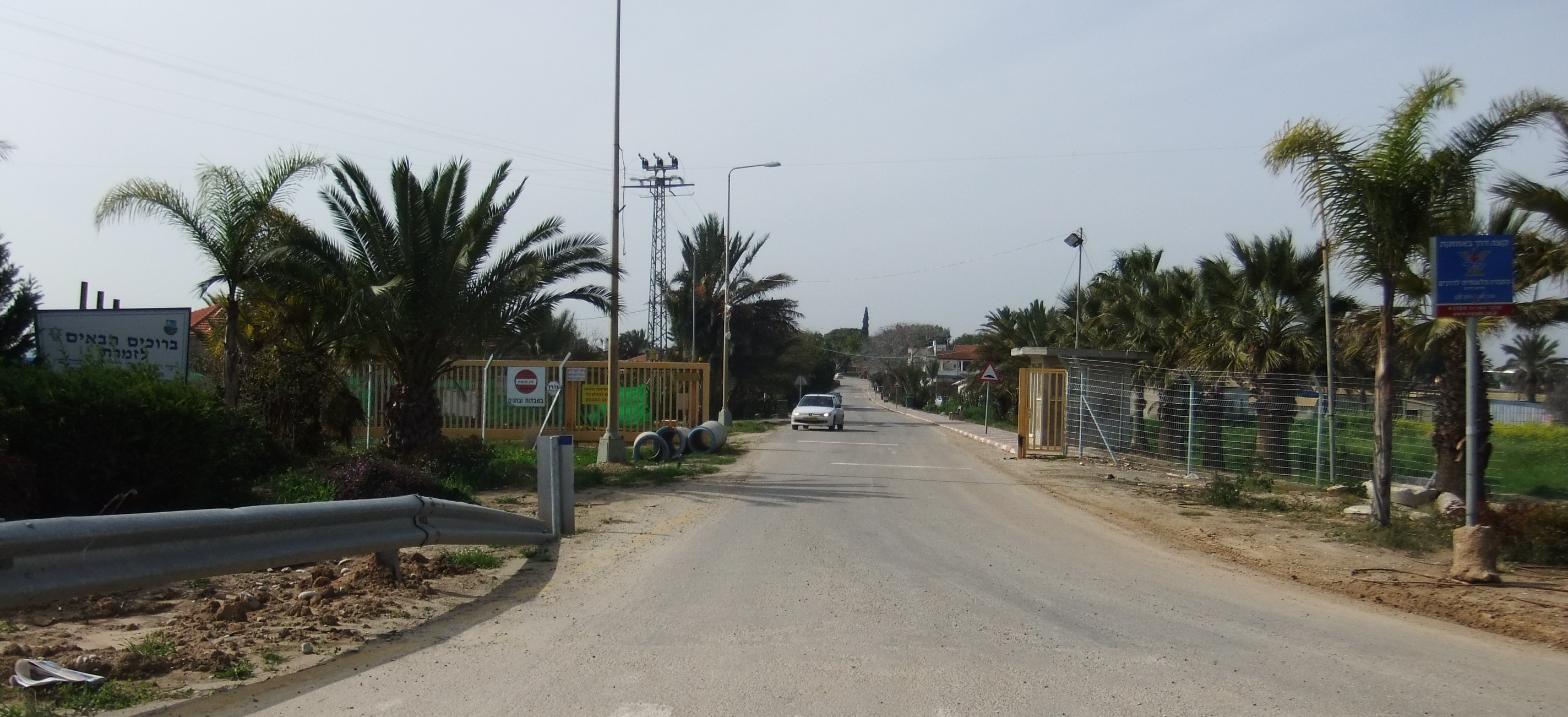
- Etymology: Song
- Location within Northwest Negev region of Israel Location within Israel
- Coordinates: 31.447710°N 34.552348°E
- Country: Israel
- District: Southern
- Subdistrict: Beersheba
- Council: Sdot Negev
- Affiliation: Hapoel HaMizrachi
- Founded: 1957
- Founder: Tunisian Jews
- Population (2024): 850

Zimrat (Hebrew: זמרת, lit. 'Song') is a religious moshav in southern Israel. Located near Netivot and covering 4,500 dunams, it falls under the jurisdiction of Sdot Negev Regional Council. In 2024 it had a population of 850.

== History ==
The village was established in 1957 by Jewish immigrants from Tunisia after a split in nearby Shuva. Initially called Shuva Bet, it was later renamed Zimrat, which was taken from the Book of Exodus 15:2;

The LORD is my strength and song, and He is become my salvation; this is my God, and I will glorify Him; my father's God, and I will exalt Him.

== Notable residents ==
- Shlomo Karhi, academic, parliamentarian and government minister
