= Mlilot =

Moshav in southern Israel

Mlilot: מלילות (Hebrew)
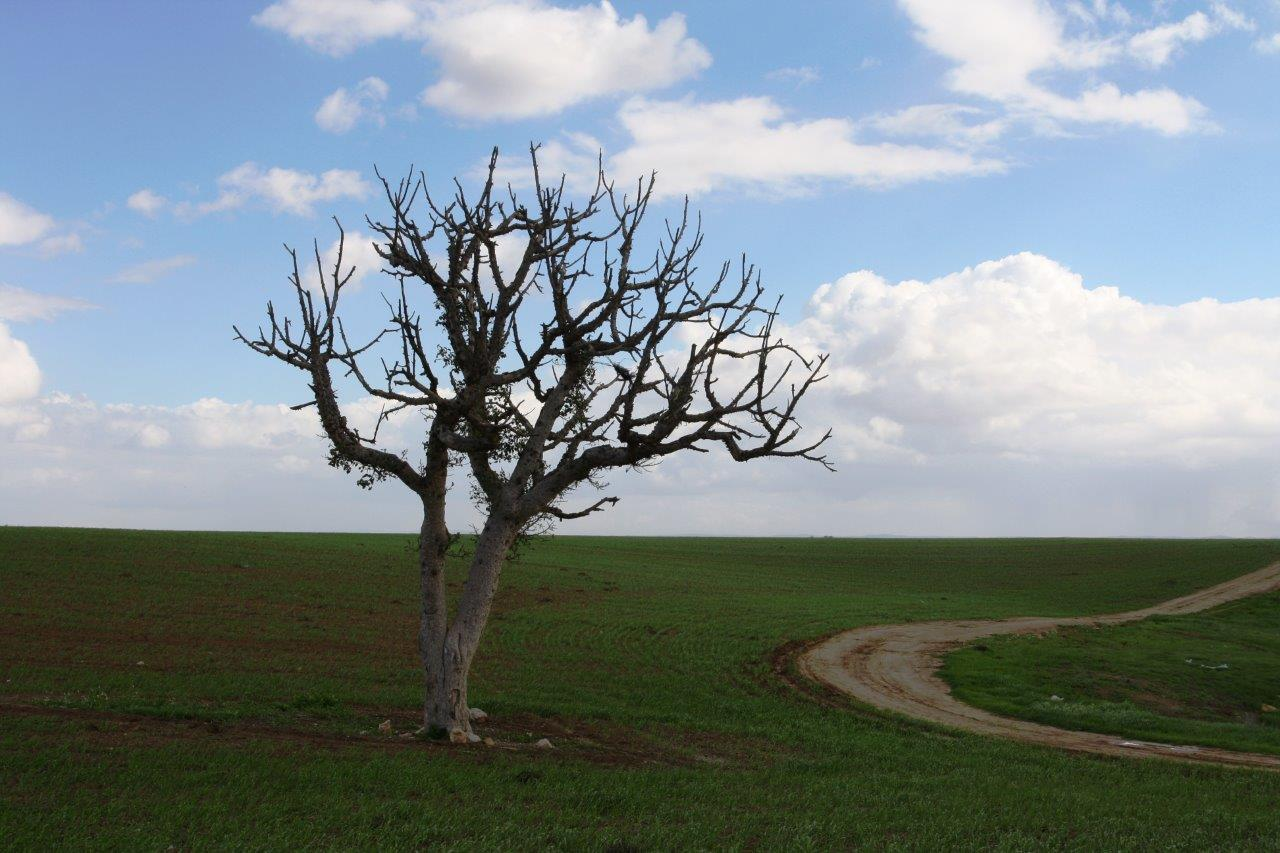
- Etymology: Bundle of ripe wheat
- Location within Northwest Negev region of Israel Location within Israel
- Coordinates: 31°23′20″N 34°35′41″E
- Country: Israel
- District: Southern
- Subdistrict: Beersheba
- Council: Sdot Negev
- Affiliation: Hapoel HaMizrachi
- Founded: 1953
- Founder: Kurdish and Persian Jews
- Population (2024): 594

Mlilot (Hebrew: מלילות, lit. 'Bundle of ripe wheat') is a religious moshav in southern Israel. Located near Netivot and covering 4,000 dunams, it falls under the jurisdiction of Sdot Negev Regional Council. In 2024 it had a population of 594.

== History ==
The village was established in 1953 by immigrants from Iran and Kurdistan, and was initially named Sharsheret Gimel.
