= Shuva =

Shuva: שובה (Hebrew)
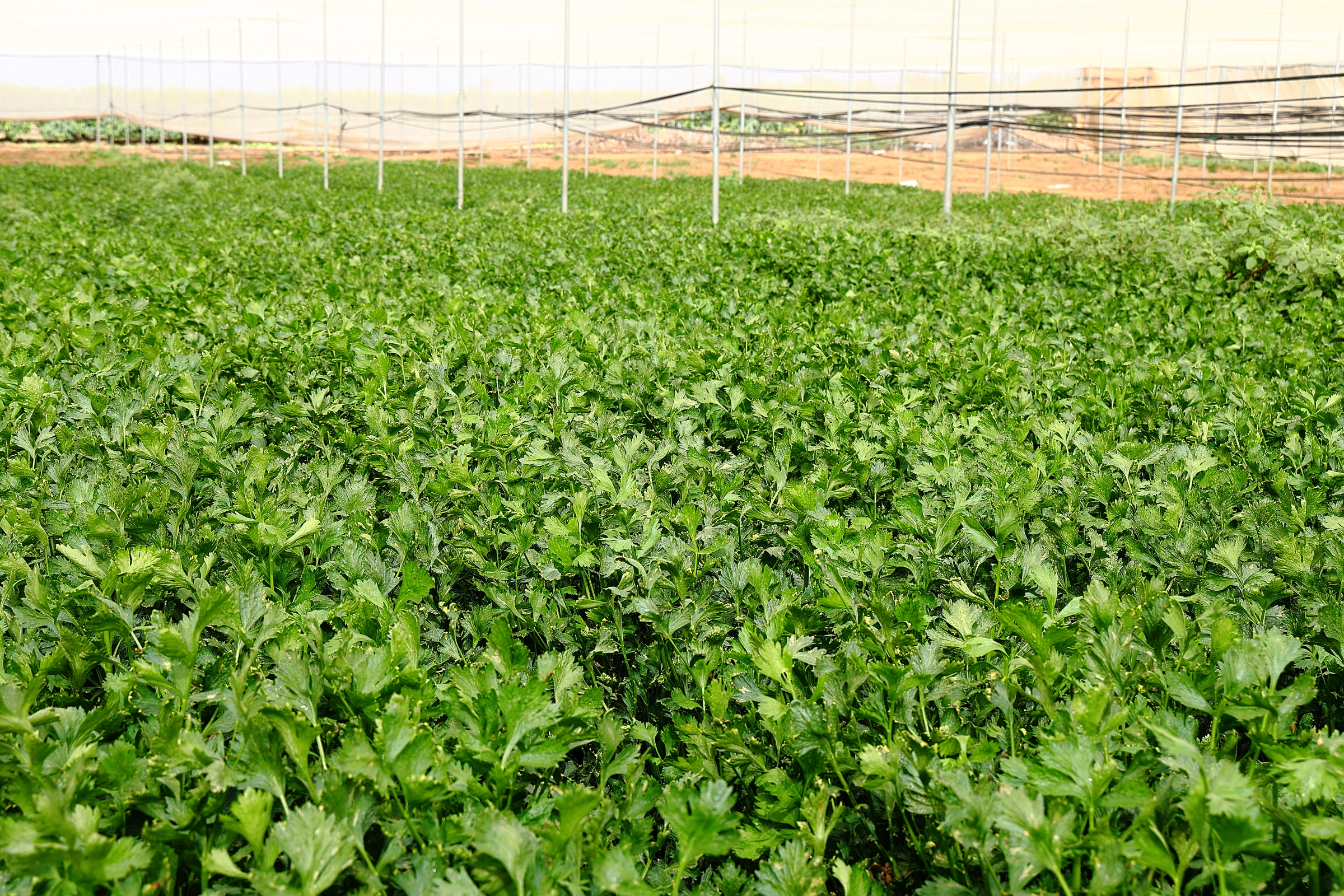

- Location within Northwest Negev region of Israel Location within Israel
- Coordinates: 31°27′4″N 34°32′42″E
- Country: Israel
- District: Southern
- Subdistrict: Beersheba
- Council: Sdot Negev
- Affiliation: Hapoel HaMizrachi
- Founded: 1950
- Founder: Libyan Jewish immigrants and refugees
- Population (2024): 1,129

Shuva (Hebrew: שובה) is a religious moshav in southern Israel. Located near Netivot and covering 4,500 dunams, it falls under the jurisdiction of Sdot Negev Regional Council. In 2024 it had a population of 1,129.

== History ==
The village was established in 1950 by Jewish immigrants and refugees from Tripoli (in modern Libya). They were later joined by more Jewish immigrants from Algeria and Tunisia. However, this created tensions between the residents, and in 1957 the moshav split in two, with the Tunisian residents leaving to form Zimrat.

Its name was taken from Psalms 126:4;

Turn our captivity, O LORD, as the streams in the dry land.
