= Sharsheret, Israel =

Sharsheret: שרשרת (Hebrew)
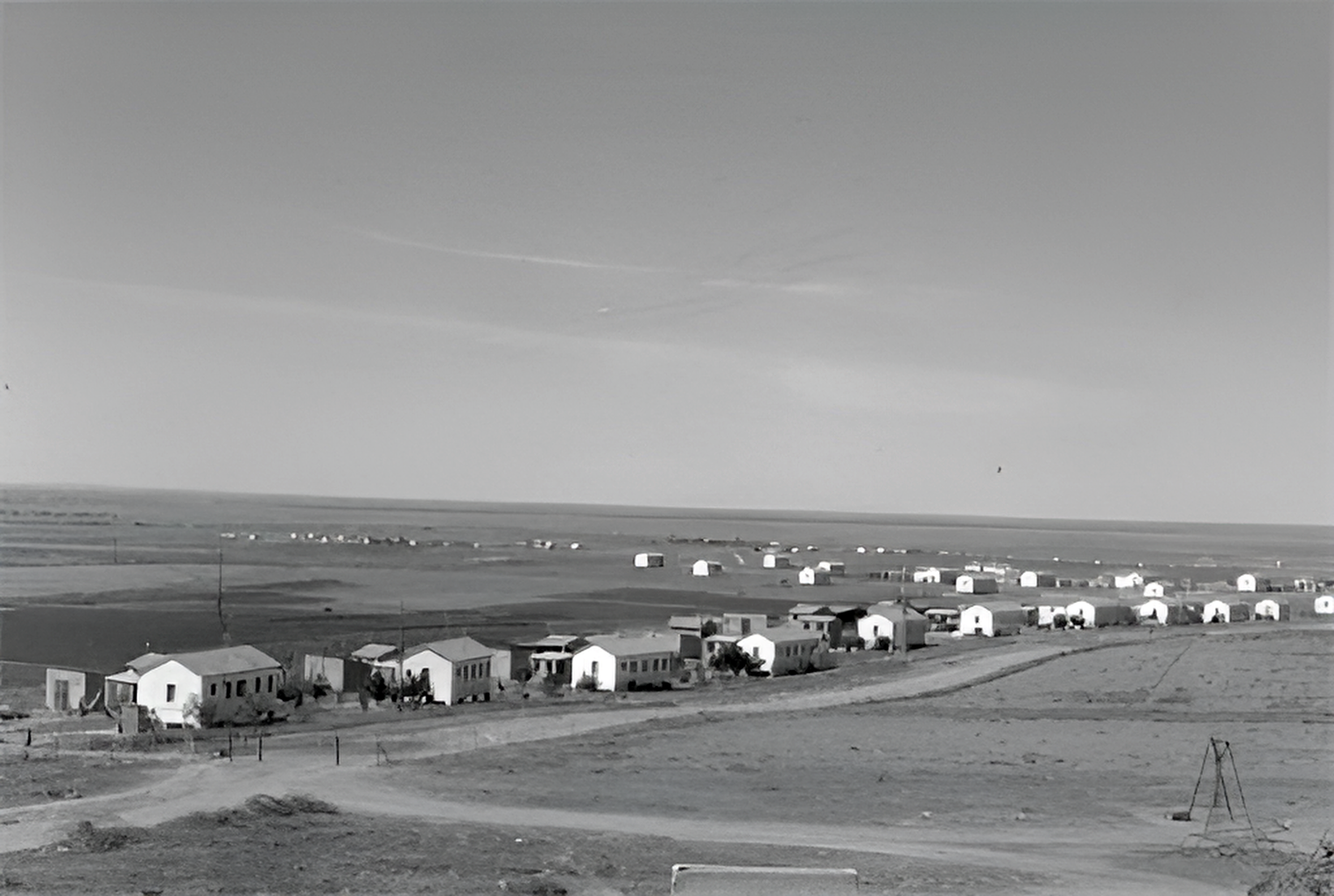
- Etymology: Chain
- Location within Northwest Negev region of Israel Location within Israel
- Coordinates: 31°24′16″N 34°36′12″E
- Country: Israel
- District: Southern
- Subdistrict: Beersheba
- Council: Sdot Negev
- Affiliation: Hapoel HaMizrachi
- Founded: 1951
- Founder: Tunisian Jews
- Population (2024): 635

Sharsheret (Hebrew: שרשרת, lit. 'Chain') is a religious moshav in southern Israel. Located near Netivot and covering 6,000 dunams, it falls under the jurisdiction of Sdot Negev Regional Council. In 2024 it had a population of 635.

== History ==
The village was established in 1951 with the help of the Jewish Agency for Israel by Bnei Akiva members who were immigrants from Tunisia. Its name (literally 'Chain') is a combination of two words, Sar (Minister, written with a Shin and also pronounceable as "Shar") and Sharett (referring to Moshe Sharett, who was Foreign Minister at the time the moshav was founded).
