= Kfar Maimon =

Moshav in southern Israel

Kfar Maimon: כפר מימון (Hebrew)
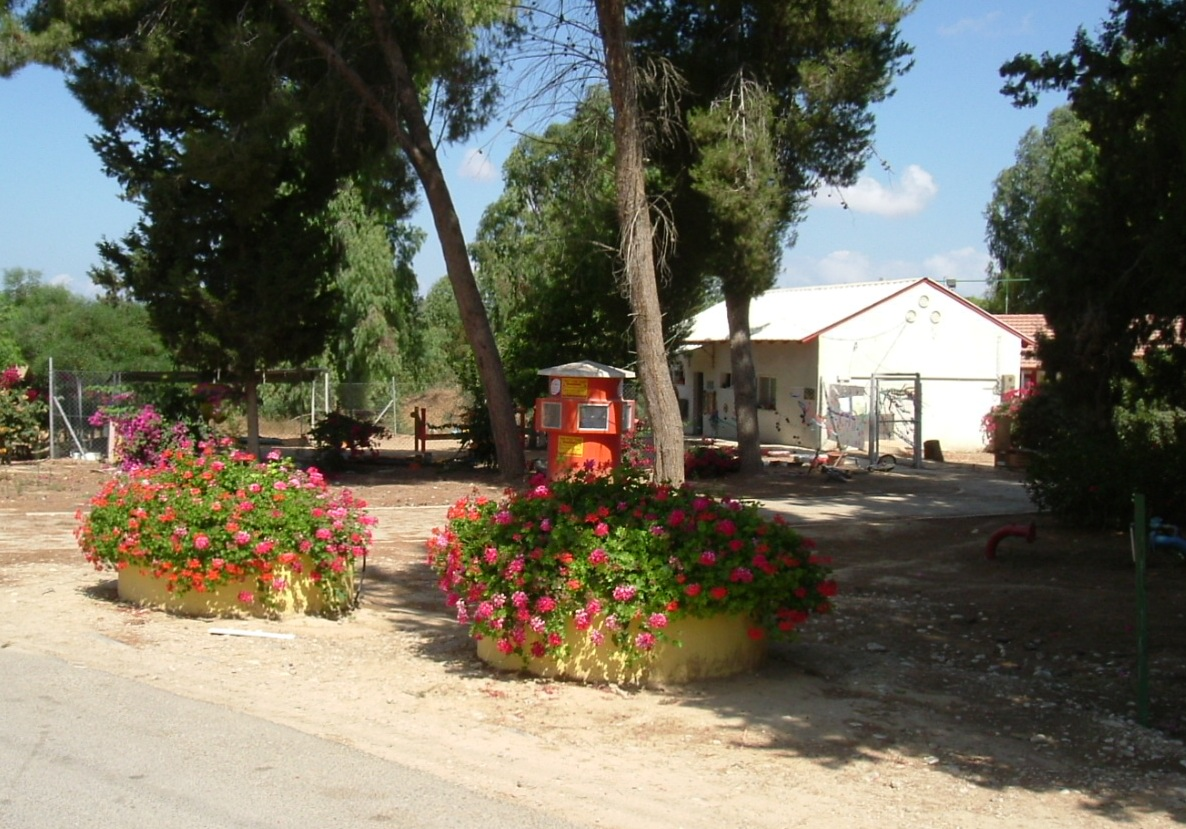
- Etymology: Maimon Village
- Location within Northwest Negev region of Israel Location within Israel
- Coordinates: 31°25′55″N 34°32′11″E
- Country: Israel
- District: Southern
- Subdistrict: Beersheba
- Council: Sdot Negev
- Affiliation: Hapoel HaMizrachi
- Founded: 1959
- Founder: Bnei Akiva members
- Population (2024): 932

Kfar Maimon (Hebrew: כפר מימון, lit. 'Maimon Village') is a religious moshav in southern Israel. Located near Netivot and covering 5,000 dunams, it falls under the jurisdiction of Sdot Negev Regional Council. In 2024 it had a population of 932.

== History ==
The village was established in 1959 with the assistance of Jewish Colonisation Association by a gar'in of Bnei Akiva members and was named after Yehuda Leib Maimon, a signatory of the Israeli declaration of independence and the first Minister of Religions.

In 2005 the village was the site of a non-violent standoff between tens of thousands of protesters against the Gaza disengagement plan, with police encircling the protesters who had started in Netivot to stop them from continuing their march to Israeli settlements in the Gaza Strip. The mass influx of demonstrators overloaded mobile telephone and other services in the small agricultural village.

"Lycée Thorani" (lit. 'Torah-based High School'), a bilingual (Hebrew and French) high school, is based in the village.
