= Netivot =

City in southern Israel

Netivot נְתִיבוֹת
- City
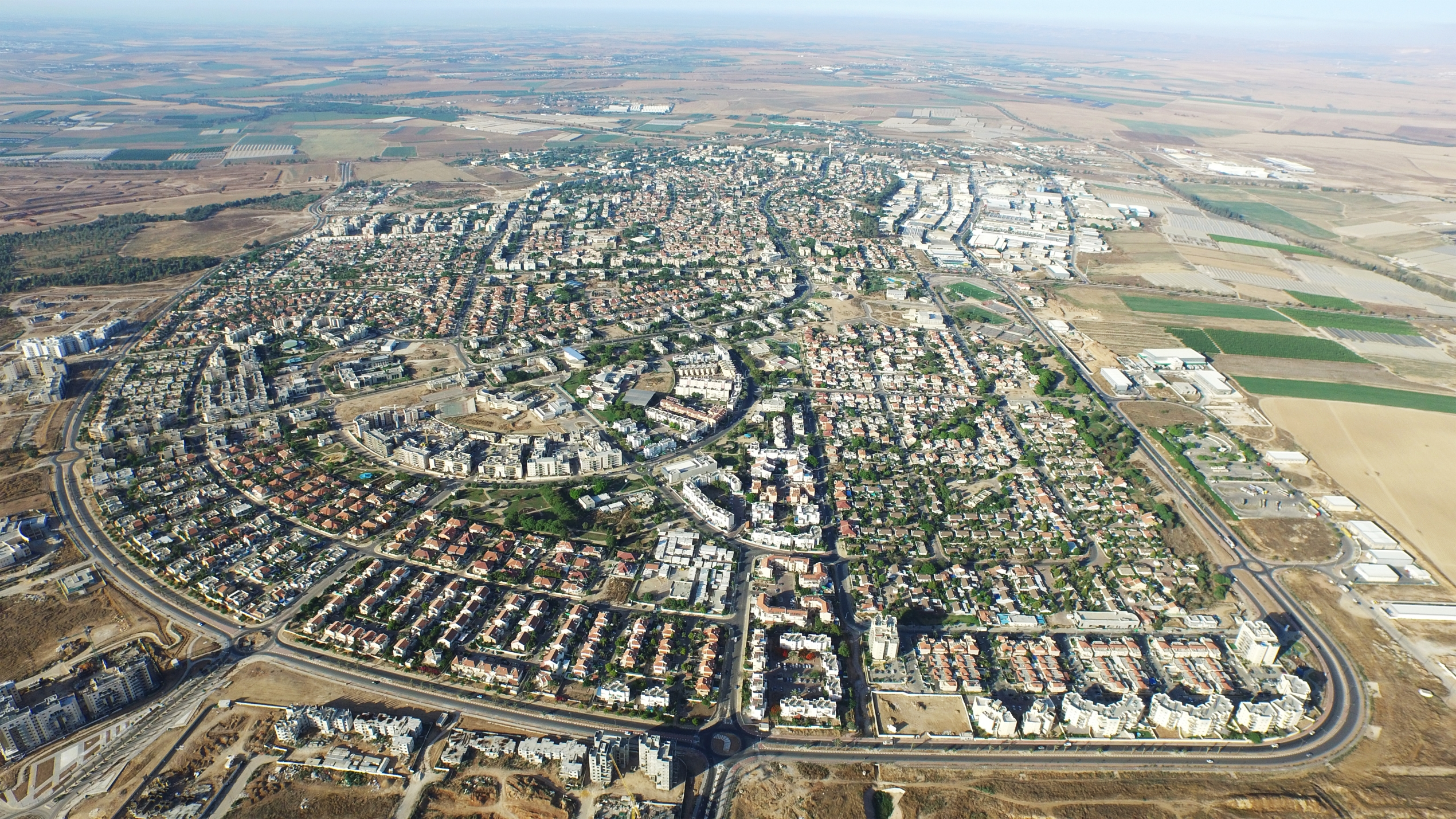
- View of Netivot

- Coat of arms

- Location within Northern Negev region of Israel Location within Israel
- Coordinates: 31°25′N 34°35′E
- Country: Israel
- District: Southern
- Subdistrict: Beersheba
- Natural Region: Gerar
- Founded: 1956
- City Status: 2000

Government
  - Mayor: Yehiel Zohar

Area
  - Total: 5,626 dunams (5.626 km^{2}; 2.172 sq mi)

Population (2024)
  - Total: 56,019
  - Density: 9,957/km^{2} (25,790/sq mi)

Ethnicity
  - Jews and others: 99.9%
  - Arabs: 0.1%
- Name meaning: Paths

Netivot (Hebrew: נְתִיבוֹת, lit. 'Paths') is a city located in the Southern District of Israel, located 11 kilometres (6.8 mi) south of Sderot and 27 kilometres (17 mi) northwest of Beersheba. In 2024 it had a population of 56,019.

== Etymology ==
Netivot literally means 'paths' in Hebrew, being the plural of nativ - a name given to the new town after the biblical verse from Proverbs 3: "All her paths are peace" (Proverbs 3:17).

== History ==
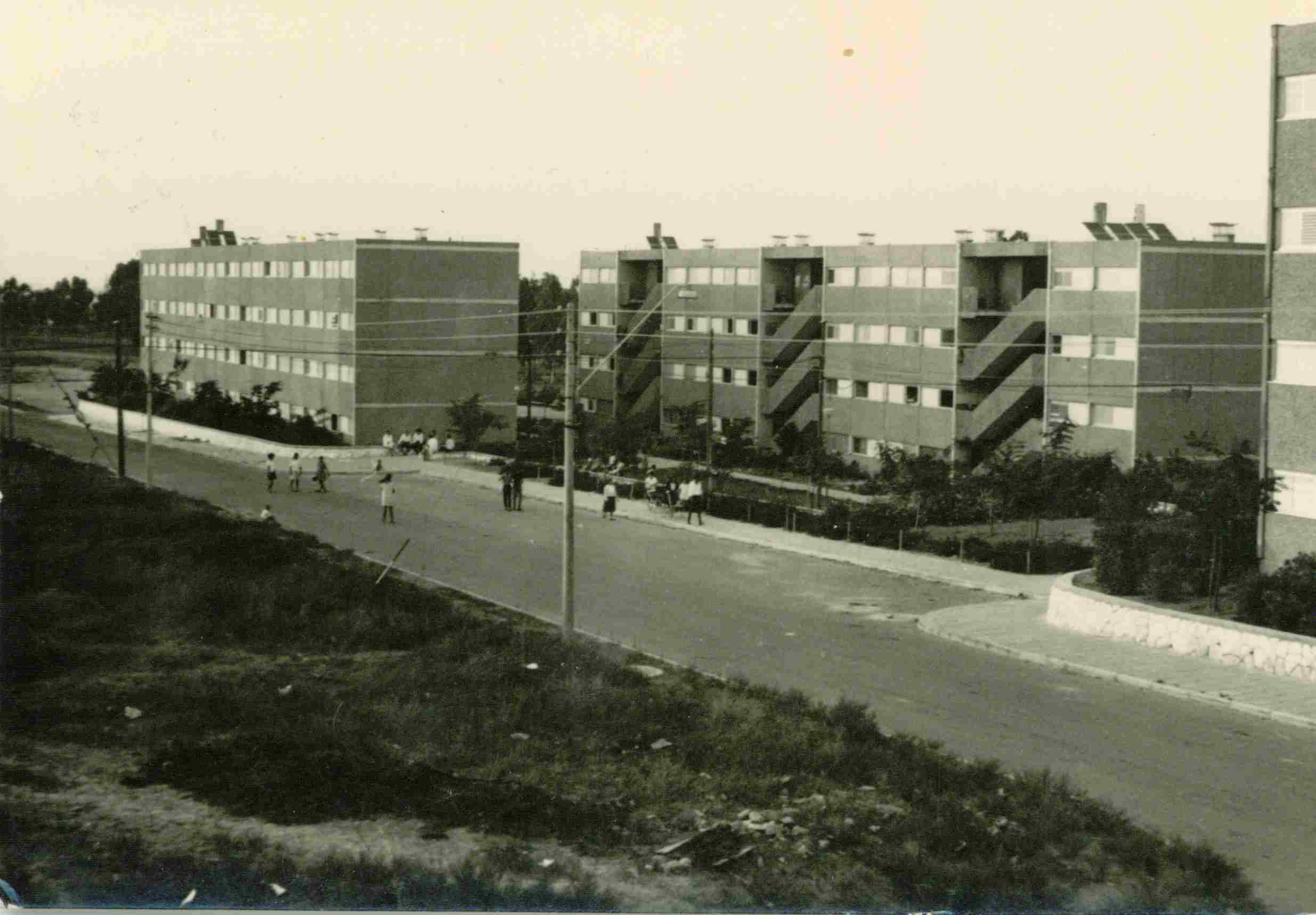
Netivot in 1960s

Netivot was founded in 1956. Initially a ma'abara, it was later transformed into a development town. The first residents were immigrants from Morocco and Tunisia. In the 1990s, they were joined by immigrants from Russia and Ethiopia.

In the mid-1990s the population was approximately 13,600, rising further to 21,800 in 2002. The increase was due to the arrival of many new immigrants; 43% of the residents were below the age of 14. At the end of 2009, Netivot had a population of 26,700. By 2017, the population had risen to 33,779. In 2000, Netivot received city status.

During the attack on Israel on 7 October 2023, several Hamas militants reached the outskirts of the city, which is located 8 miles (13 kilometers) from the Gaza Strip, but were eliminated by security forces before entering the city. Nonetheless, a Palestinian rocket attack that day struck a home, taking the lives of three members of the same family.

== Demographics ==
Historical population
Year	Pop.	±%
1972	5,900	—
1983	7,800	+32.2%
1995	15,000	+92.3%
2008	26,100	+74.0%
2022	45,024	+72.5%
2024	56,019	+24.4%

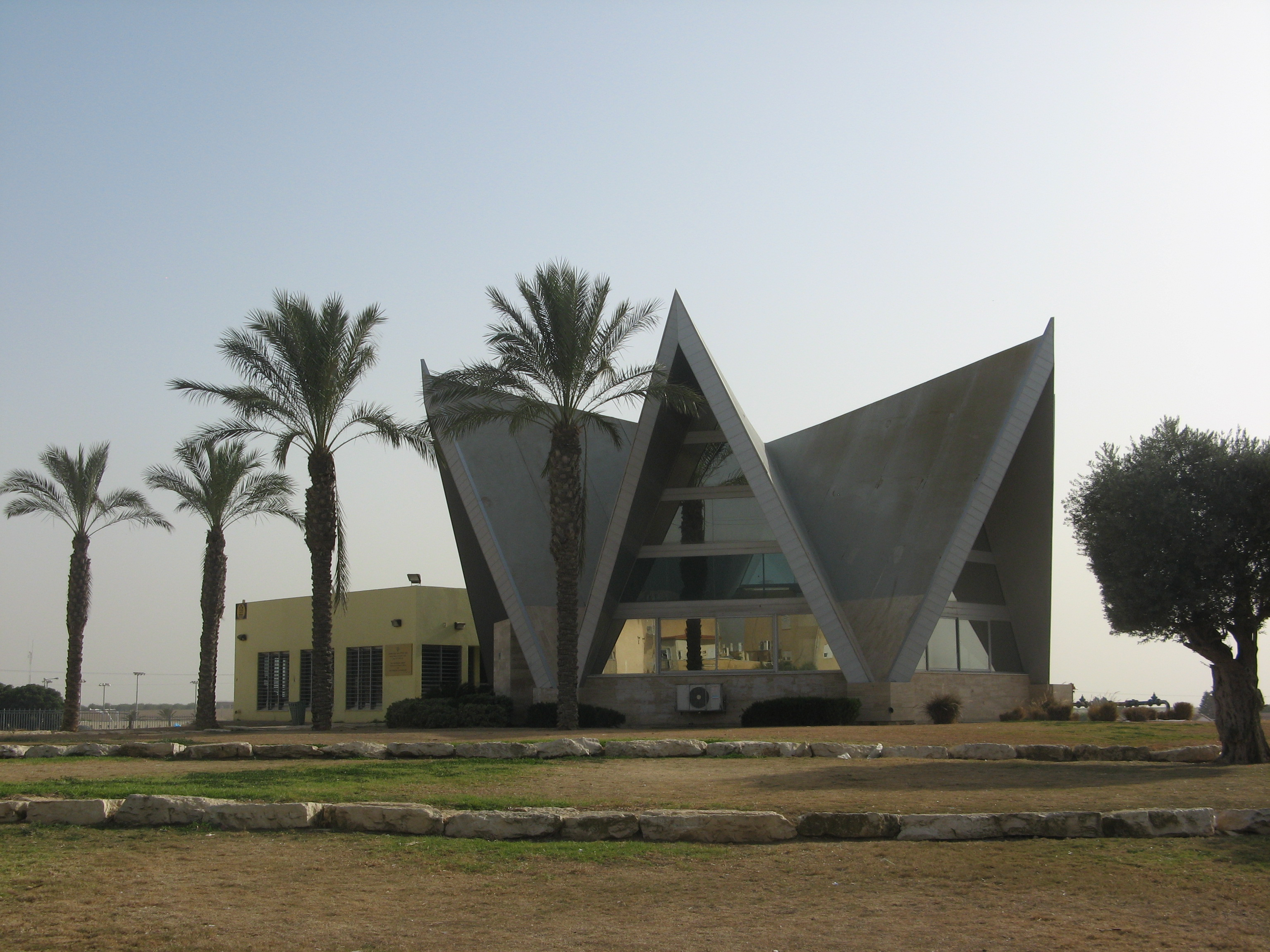
Ethiopian cultural center in Netivot

In 2001, the ethnic make-up of the city was 99.9% Jewish, and the population was evenly divided between males and females. The city ranked relatively low in the socio-economic index (3 out of 10). In the wake of Operation Solomon, Netivot absorbed a large number of Ethiopian Jewish immigrants.

== Education ==
According to the Central Bureau of Statistics, there were 22 schools and 4,243 students in the city: 16 elementary schools with 3,053 students, and 11 high schools with 1,190 students. 43.1% of 12th grade students were entitled to a Bagrut matriculation certificate in 2001.

In 2009, a high school student from Netivot won first prize in the First Step to Nobel Prize in Physics competition.

Netivot schools have been chosen for a special pilot project in which elementary school children build their own mini-robots. In 2011, Netivot hosted a robotics festival sponsored by the international organization FIRST - For Inspiration and Recognition of Science and Technology. First-, second,- and third-graders at the Noam Eliyahu religious school in Netivot spend eight hours a week studying science and robotics at Lehava, the municipal science center.

The Mandel Center for Leadership in the Negev (MCLN) runs a two-year community-based leadership program in Netivot.

Netivot hosts the Yeshivat HaNegev, "the Yeshiva of the Negev", a Haredi institution headed as of October 2024 by Rabbi Aryeh Leib Levi, with approximately 200 students. It was founded in 1966 by Rabbi Issachar Meir, and was renamed Yeshivat Hanegev Shachar Shakir after him on his death.

The city is also home to the Religious Zionist Hesder Yeshiva of Netivot, "Ahavat Yisrael". It was founded in 2000 by Rabbi Yisrael Friedman and is today headed by Rabbi David Asulin with approximately 50 students.

== Transportation ==
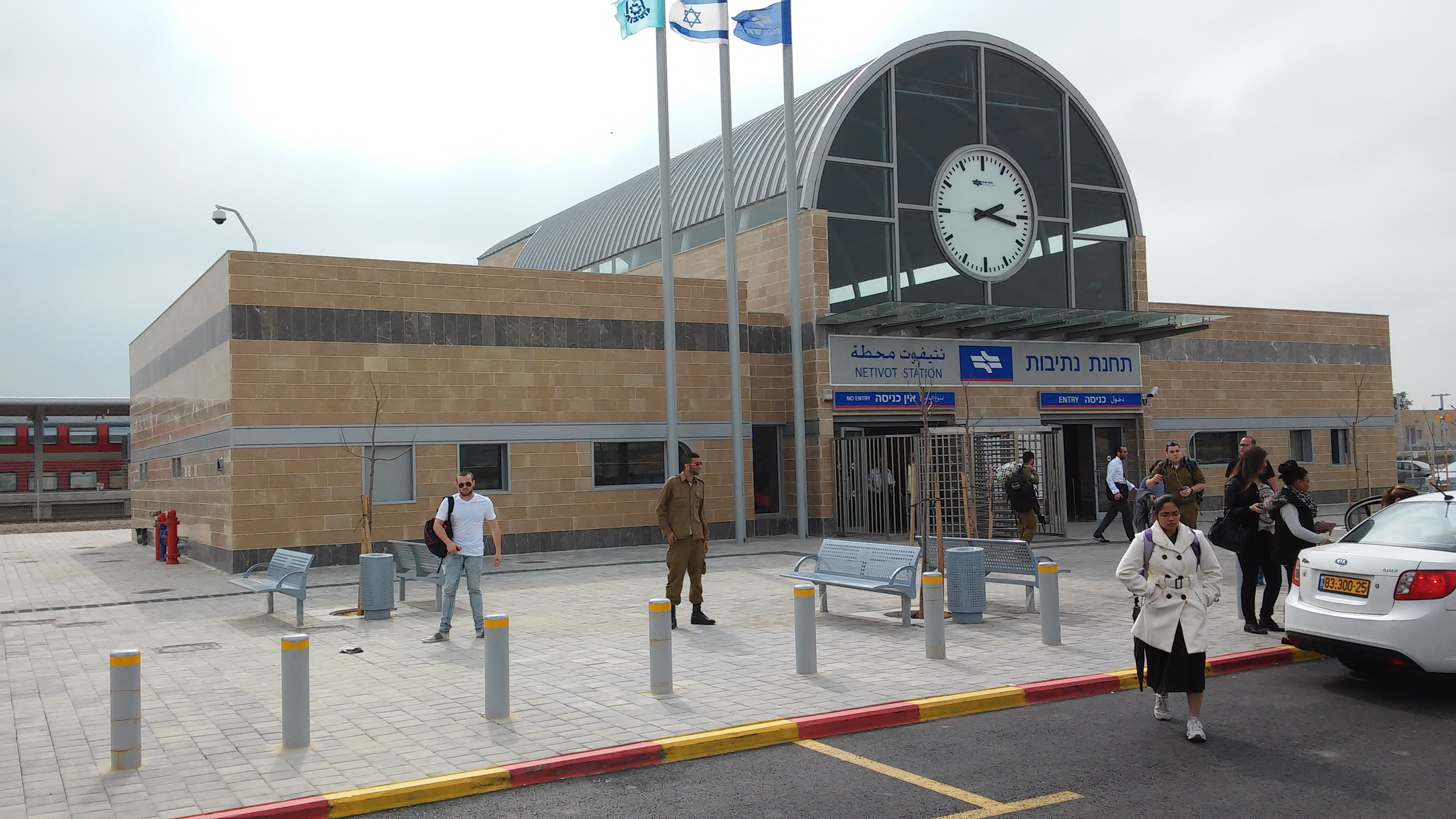
Netivot railway station

Netivot is accessible by Highway 34, Highway 25 and Route 232.

The Ashkelon–Beersheba railway, a new railway line which connected Netivot with Tel Aviv and Beersheba, was inaugurated in February 2015. The Netivot railway station located on the western outskirts of the city, was opened on February 15, 2015. A bus terminal is located adjacent to the station.

== Culture ==
Netivot is known for being the home of Jewish mystics and as a popular pilgrimage site. The growth of mysticism and sacred sites in Netivot led to it being dubbed the "Varanasi of Israel."

Important rabbinical figures tied to Netivot include Yaakov Israel Ifergan, Yoram Abergel, and most prominently, Israel Abuhatzeira (Hebrew: ר׳ יִשְׂרָאֵל אַבּוּחַצִירָא) – the "Babi Sali" (1889–1984), a renowned Moroccan-born, Sephardic-Kabbalist rabbi, who had eventually settled there.

Once a year, on the Hebrew date of his death, thousands of followers descend on the tomb in commemoration.

Eleven local newspapers are published in the city.

Three successful nightclubs have opened in Netivot which also draw clientele from out of town, attracting young people from Ashkelon, Beersheba, Omer, Lehavim, Ofakim, and Sderot.

== Development plans ==
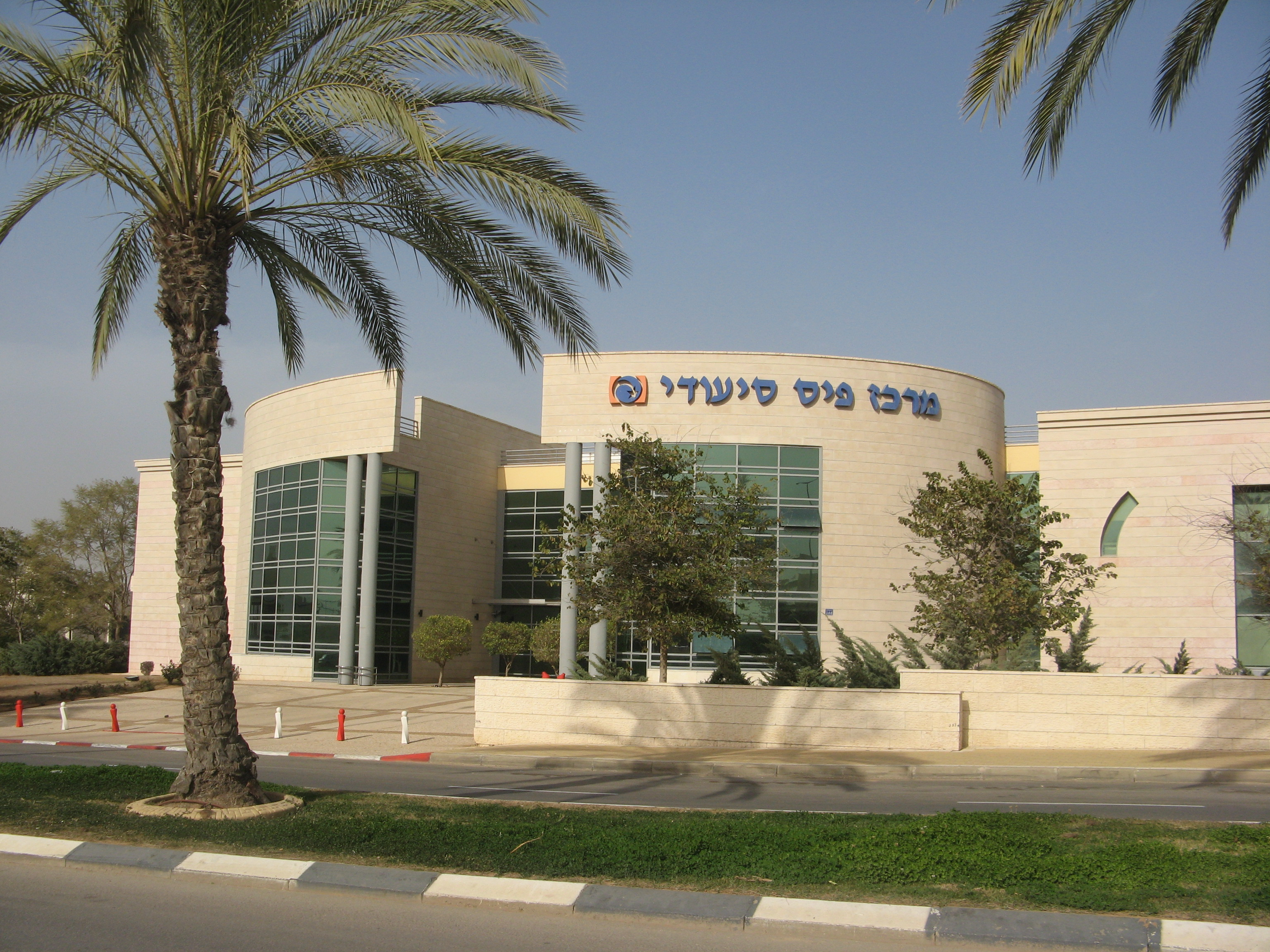
Architecture in Netivot

In 2019, two new neighborhoods with a total of 3,600 housing units planned for Netivot were expected to double the city's population. Two large supermarkets were also planned which would bring the total to 9.

== Industry ==
There are 24 plants and factories located in a nearby industrial park, mostly in food processing, metals, plastics, and construction sectors. There are an additional 15 factories located in the city in some of the same sectors as above, and also chemical and mineral sectors.

== Voting Patterns ==
In the 2022 election, 92 percent of voters in Netivot voted for the parties of the right-wing coalition led by Benjamin Netanyahu, while 7 percent voted for the parties of the center-left coalition led by Yair Lapid and 0.06 percent voted for the Arab parties.

In the 2026 election, 89 percent of voters in Netivot voted for the parties of the right-wing coalition led by Benjamin Netanyahu, while 7 percent voted for the parties of the center-left coalition led by Gadi Eisenkot and 0.1 percent voted for the Arab parties. An additional 1.7 percent voted for the Reservists, and 1.2 percent voted for Amcha Yisrael. Voter turnout increased 34 percent from the 2022 election.
