= Northern Negev Mountains Natural Region =

Coordinates: 30°52′27″N 34°47′39″E

- Natural Region
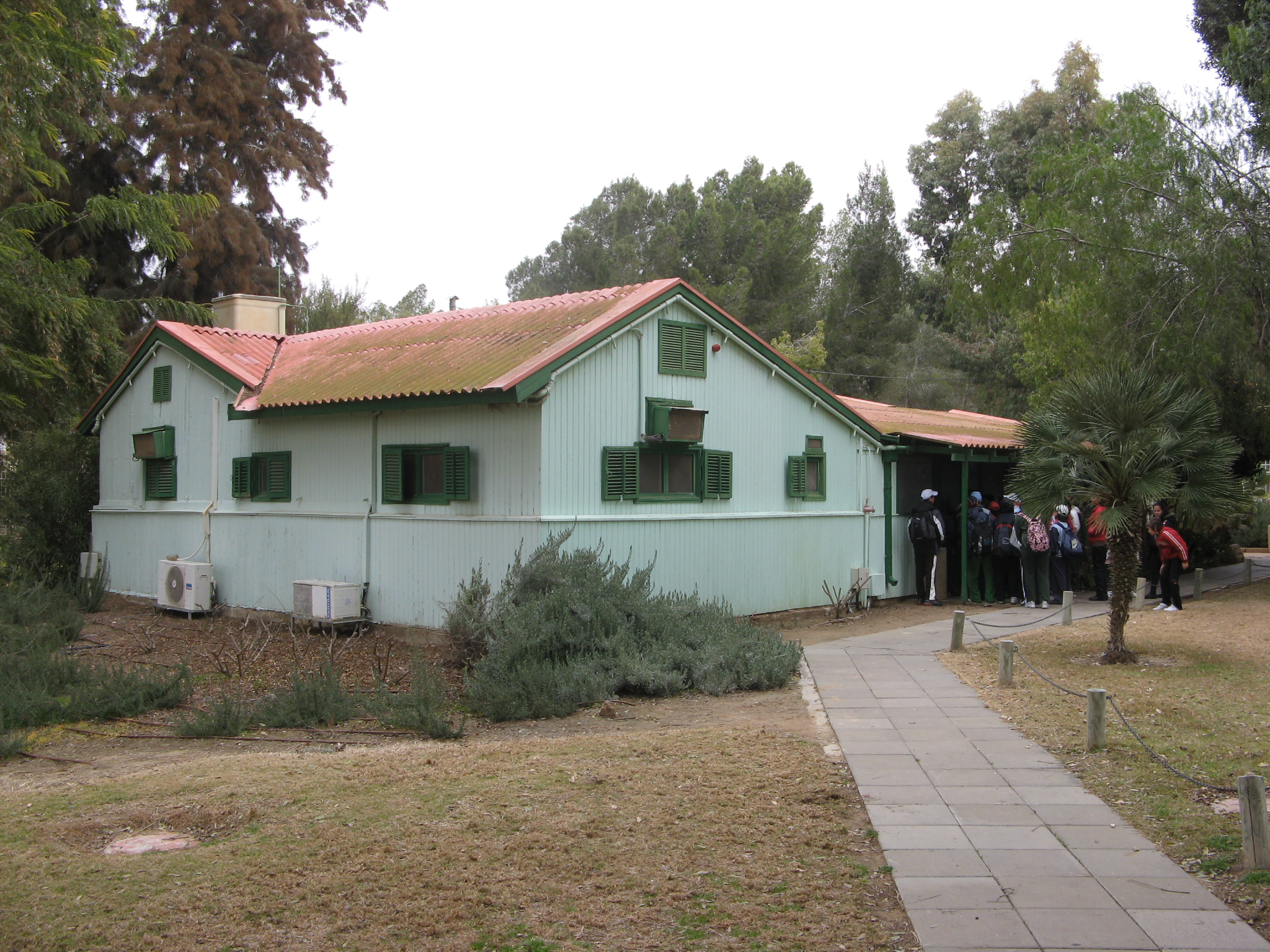
- Retirement home of David Ben-Gurion, in Sde Boker
- Country: Israel
- District: Southern
- Subdistrict: Beersheba
- Largest City: Dimona

Area
  - Total: 4,831 km^{2} (1,865 sq mi)

Population (2024)
  - Total: 69,445

Ethnicity
  - Jews and others: 89.3%
  - Arabs: 7.2%

The Northern Negev Mountains Natural Region is a natural region in the Beersheba Subdistrict, in the Southern District of Israel. Dimona is the largest city in the natural region.

== Geography ==
Districts, Subdistricts and Natural Regions of the State of Israel, 2018

The natural region consists of the mountainous northern and central portions of the Negev Desert in southern Israel, south of Beersheba and north of Eilat. It stretches from Dimona in the north to Mitzpe Ramon in the south, and extends west to the border with Egypt. It has an area of 4,831 km^{2}, making it the largest natural region in Israel. The largest city in the natural region is Dimona, which contains 57 percent of the natural region's population. The second-largest city in the natural region is Yeruham. The natural region contains the Ramat HaNegev Regional Council as well as a portion of the Neve Midbar Regional Council.

== Demographics ==
89 percent of the residents of the Northern Negev Mountains Natural Region are Jewish. 7 percent of residents are Arab, more than half of whom live in the Bedouin town of Bir Hadaj.

Historical population
Year	Pop.	±%
1972	32,500	—
1983	37,200	+14.5%
1995	45,300	+21.8%
2008	49,620	+9.5%
2022	64,952	+30.9%
2024	69,445	+6.9%

== Administrative local authorities ==
Cities	Local Councils	Villages
Dimona	Mitzpe Ramon; Yeruham	Neve Midbar: Bir Hadaj; Ramat HaNegev: Ashalim; Be'er Milka; Ezuz; Kmehin; Mashabei Sadeh; Merhav Am; Midreshet Ben Gurion; Nitzana; Nitzanei Sinai; Retamim; Revivim; Ruah Midbar; Sde Boker; Sheizaf; Tlalim

== Voting Patterns ==
In the 2022 election, 70 percent of voters in the natural region voted for the parties of the right-wing coalition led by Benjamin Netanyahu, while 24 percent voted for the parties of the center-left coalition led by Yair Lapid and 3 percent voted for the Arab parties.

In the 2026 election, 63 percent of voters in the natural region voted for the parties of the right-wing coalition led by Benjamin Netanyahu, while 25 percent voted for the parties of the center-left coalition led by Gadi Eisenkot and 6 percent voted for the Arab parties. An additional 2.7 percent voted for the Reservists, and 2 percent voted for Amcha Yisrael. Voter turnout increased 19 percent from the 2022 election.
