= List of kibbutzim =

The following is a list of kibbutzim (Hebrew: קיבוצים) in Israel, grouped by affiliation, with their year of foundation in brackets. In 2004, there were 266 kibbutzim with population 116,000 or 2.1% of the Jewish population of Israel. In 2010, there were 270 kibbutzim in Israel with population of 126,000.

== List of kibbutzim ==
Name	Foundation	Affiliation	Classification	Comments
Adamit	1958	Kibbutz Movement	Renewing kibbutz	
Afek	1939	Kibbutz Movement	Renewing kibbutz	
Afik	1967	Kibbutz Movement	Renewing kibbutz	
Afikim	1932	Kibbutz Movement	Renewing kibbutz	
Alonim	1938	Kibbutz Movement	Renewing kibbutz	
Almog	1977	Kibbutz Movement	Renewing kibbutz	
Alumim	1966	Religious Kibbutz Movement	Cooperative kibbutz	
Alumot	1947	Kibbutz Movement	Renewing kibbutz	
Ami'ad	1946	Kibbutz Movement	Renewing kibbutz	
Amir	1939	Kibbutz Movement	Renewing kibbutz	
Ashdot Ya'akov Ihud	1953	Kibbutz Movement	Renewing kibbutz	Split from Ashdot Ya'akov, founded 1924, then again 1933
Ashdot Ya'akov Meuhad	1953	Kibbutz Movement	Renewing kibbutz	Split from Ashdot Ya'akov, founded 1924, then again 1933
Ayelet HaShahar	1918	Kibbutz Movement	Renewing kibbutz	
Bahan	1953	Kibbutz Movement	Renewing kibbutz	
Bar'am	1949	Kibbutz Movement	Cooperative kibbutz	
Barkai	1949	Kibbutz Movement	Renewing kibbutz	
Be'eri	1946	Kibbutz Movement	Cooperative kibbutz	
Be'erot Yitzhak	1943	Religious Kibbutz Movement	Renewing kibbutz	
Beit Alfa	1922	Kibbutz Movement	Renewing kibbutz	
Beit Guvrin	1949	Kibbutz Movement	Renewing kibbutz	
Beit HaArava	1939	Kibbutz Movement	Renewing kibbutz	
Beit HaEmek	1949	Kibbutz Movement	Renewing kibbutz	
Beit HaShita	1928	Kibbutz Movement	Renewing kibbutz	
Beit Kama	1949	Kibbutz Movement	Renewing kibbutz	
Beit Keshet	1944	Kibbutz Movement	Renewing kibbutz	
Beit Nir	1955	Kibbutz Movement	Renewing kibbutz	
Beit Oren	1939		Renewing kibbutz	
Beit Rimon	1979	Religious Kibbutz Movement	Renewing kibbutz	
Beit Zera	1921	Kibbutz Movement	Renewing kibbutz	
Bror Hayil	1948	Kibbutz Movement	Renewing kibbutz	
Dafna	1939	Kibbutz Movement	Renewing kibbutz	
Dalia	1939	Kibbutz Movement	Renewing kibbutz	
Dan	1939	Kibbutz Movement	Renewing kibbutz	
Degania Alef	1910	Kibbutz Movement	Renewing kibbutz	
Degania Bet	1920	Kibbutz Movement	Cooperative kibbutz	
Dorot	1941	Kibbutz Movement	Renewing kibbutz	
Dovrat	1948	Kibbutz Movement	Renewing kibbutz	
Dvir	1951	Kibbutz Movement	Renewing kibbutz	
Eilon	1938	Kibbutz Movement	Renewing kibbutz	
Eilot	1962	Kibbutz Movement	Cooperative kibbutz	
Ein Carmel	1947	Kibbutz Movement	Renewing kibbutz	
Ein Dor	1948	Kibbutz Movement	Renewing kibbutz	
Ein Gedi	1953	Kibbutz Movement	Renewing kibbutz	
Ein Gev	1937	Kibbutz Movement	Renewing kibbutz	
Ein HaHoresh	1931	Kibbutz Movement	Renewing kibbutz	
Ein HaMifratz	1938	Kibbutz Movement	Cooperative kibbutz	
Ein HaNatziv	1946	Religious Kibbutz Movement	Cooperative kibbutz	
Ein Harod (Ihud)	1952	Kibbutz Movement	Cooperative kibbutz	Split from Ein Harod, founded 1921
Ein Harod (Meuhad)	1952	Kibbutz Movement	Renewing kibbutz	Split from Ein Harod, founded 1921
Ein HaShlosha	1950	Kibbutz Movement	Renewing kibbutz	
Ein HaShofet	1937	Kibbutz Movement	Cooperative kibbutz	
Ein Shemer	1927	Kibbutz Movement	Renewing kibbutz	
Ein Tzurim	1946	Religious Kibbutz Movement	Renewing kibbutz	
Ein Zivan	1968	Kibbutz Movement	Renewing kibbutz	
Einat	1925	Kibbutz Movement	Renewing kibbutz	
El Rom	1971	Kibbutz Movement	Renewing kibbutz	
Elifaz	1982	Kibbutz Movement	Renewing kibbutz	
Erez	1950	Kibbutz Movement	Cooperative kibbutz	
Eshbal	1998	Kibbutz Movement	Cooperative kibbutz	
Evron	1937	Kibbutz Movement	Renewing kibbutz	
Eyal	1949	Kibbutz Movement	Renewing kibbutz	
Ga'ash	1951	Kibbutz Movement	Renewing kibbutz	
Ga'aton	1948	Kibbutz Movement	Renewing kibbutz	
Gadot	1949	Kibbutz Movement	Renewing kibbutz	
Gal On	1946	Kibbutz Movement	Renewing kibbutz	
Galed	1945	Kibbutz Movement	Cooperative kibbutz	
Gan Shmuel	1920	Kibbutz Movement	Cooperative kibbutz	
Gat	1941	Kibbutz Movement	Renewing kibbutz	
Gazit	1948	Kibbutz Movement	Cooperative kibbutz	
Gesher HaZiv	1949	Kibbutz Movement	Renewing kibbutz	
Gesher	1939	Kibbutz Movement	Renewing kibbutz	
Geshur	1971	Kibbutz Movement	Renewing kibbutz	
Geva	1921	Kibbutz Movement	Cooperative kibbutz	
Gevat	1926	Kibbutz Movement	Renewing kibbutz	
Gevim	1947	Kibbutz Movement	Cooperative kibbutz	
Gezer	1945	Kibbutz Movement	Renewing kibbutz	
Gilgal	1972	Kibbutz Movement	Renewing kibbutz	
Ginegar	1922	Kibbutz Movement	Renewing kibbutz	Split from Degania Gimel, founded 1920
Ginosar	1937	Kibbutz Movement	Renewing kibbutz	
Givat Brenner	1928	Kibbutz Movement	Renewing kibbutz	
Givat Haim (Ihud)	1953	Kibbutz Movement	Renewing kibbutz	
Givat Haim (Meuhad)	1953	Kibbutz Movement	Renewing kibbutz	
Givat HaShlosha	1925	Kibbutz Movement	Renewing kibbutz	
Givat Oz	1949	Kibbutz Movement	Renewing kibbutz	
Glil Yam	1943	Kibbutz Movement	Renewing kibbutz	
Gonen	1951	Kibbutz Movement	Renewing kibbutz	
Grofit	1966	Kibbutz Movement	Cooperative kibbutz	
Gvulot	1943	Kibbutz Movement	Renewing kibbutz	
Hafetz Haim	1944	Non-affiliated religious kibbutz	Renewing kibbutz	
HaGoshrim	1948	Kibbutz Movement	Renewing kibbutz	
Hahoterim	1952	Kibbutz Movement	Renewing kibbutz	
Hamadia	1939	Kibbutz Movement	Renewing kibbutz	
Hanaton	1984	Kibbutz Movement	Renewing kibbutz	
Hanita	1938	Kibbutz Movement	Renewing kibbutz	
HaOgen	1947	Kibbutz Movement	Renewing kibbutz	
HaOn	1949		Renewing kibbutz	Community settlement since 2007
Harduf	1982	Kibbutz Movement	Renewing kibbutz	Anthroposophic kibbutz
Harel	1948	Kibbutz Movement	Renewing kibbutz	
HaSolelim	1949	Kibbutz Movement	Renewing kibbutz	
Hatzerim	1946	Kibbutz Movement	Cooperative kibbutz	
Hatzor	1946	Kibbutz Movement	Renewing kibbutz	
Hazorea	1936	Kibbutz Movement	Renewing kibbutz	
Heftziba	1922	Kibbutz Movement	Renewing kibbutz	
Hokuk	1946	Kibbutz Movement	Renewing kibbutz	
Holit	1982	Kibbutz Movement	Renewing kibbutz	
Horshim	1955	Kibbutz Movement	Renewing kibbutz	
Hulda	1930	Kibbutz Movement	Renewing kibbutz	
Kabri	1949	Kibbutz Movement	Renewing kibbutz	
Kalia	1974	Kibbutz Movement	Renewing kibbutz	
Karmia	1950	Kibbutz Movement	Renewing kibbutz	
Ketura	1970	Kibbutz Movement	Cooperative kibbutz	
Kfar Aza	1951	Kibbutz Movement	Renewing kibbutz	
Kfar Blum	1943	Kibbutz Movement	Renewing kibbutz	
Kfar Etzion	1927, 1934, 1943, 1967	Religious Kibbutz Movement	Renewing kibbutz	
Kfar Giladi	1916	Kibbutz Movement	Renewing kibbutz	
Kfar HaHoresh	1933	Kibbutz Movement	Renewing kibbutz	
Kfar HaMaccabi	1936	Kibbutz Movement	Renewing kibbutz	
Kfar HaNassi	1948	Kibbutz Movement	Renewing kibbutz	
Kfar Haruv	1973	Kibbutz Movement	Renewing kibbutz	
Kfar Masaryk	1933	Kibbutz Movement	Renewing kibbutz	
Kfar Menahem	1937	Kibbutz Movement	Renewing kibbutz	
Kfar Ruppin	1938	Kibbutz Movement	Renewing kibbutz	
Kfar Szold	1942	Kibbutz Movement	Renewing kibbutz	
Kfar Yehoshua	1927	Kibbutz Movement	Renewing kibbutz	
Beth-El	1970	Kibbutz Movement	Renewing kibbutz	
Kiryat Anavim	1920	Kibbutz Movement	Renewing kibbutz	
Kissufim	1951	Kibbutz Movement	Renewing kibbutz	
Kramim	1980	Kibbutz Movement	Renewing kibbutz	
Kinneret	1913	Kibbutz Movement	Renewing kibbutz	
Shiller	1927	Kibbutz Movement	Renewing kibbutz	
Yavne	1941	Religious Kibbutz Movement	Cooperative kibbutz	
Lahav	1952	Kibbutz Movement	Renewing kibbutz	
Lavi	1949	Religious Kibbutz Movement	Cooperative kibbutz	
Lehavot HaBashan	1945	Kibbutz Movement	Renewing kibbutz	
Lehavot Haviva	1949	Kibbutz Movement	Renewing kibbutz	
Lohamey HaGeta'ot	1949	Kibbutz Movement	Renewing kibbutz	
Lotan	1983	Kibbutz Movement	Renewing kibbutz	
Ma'abarot	1925	Kibbutz Movement	Cooperative kibbutz	
Ma'agan Michael	1949	Kibbutz Movement	Cooperative kibbutz	
Ma'ale Gilboa	1963	Religious Kibbutz Movement	Renewing kibbutz	
Ma'ale HaHamisha	1938	Kibbutz Movement	Renewing kibbutz	
Ma'anit	1942	Kibbutz Movement	Renewing kibbutz	
Ma'ayan Baruch	1947	Kibbutz Movement	Renewing kibbutz	
Ma'ayan Tzvi	1938	Kibbutz Movement	Renewing kibbutz	
Magal	1953	Kibbutz Movement	Renewing kibbutz	
Magen	1949	Kibbutz Movement	Cooperative kibbutz	
Malkia	1949	Kibbutz Movement	Renewing kibbutz	
Manara	1943	Kibbutz Movement	Renewing kibbutz	
Maoz Haim	1937	Kibbutz Movement	Renewing kibbutz	
Masada	1937		Renewing kibbutz	
Mashabei Sadeh	1947	Kibbutz Movement	Cooperative kibbutz	
Matzuba	1940	Kibbutz Movement	Renewing kibbutz	
Mefalsim	1949	Kibbutz Movement	Renewing kibbutz	
Megiddo	1949	Kibbutz Movement	Renewing kibbutz	
Meirav	1987	Religious Kibbutz Movement	Renewing kibbutz	
Merhavia	1929	Kibbutz Movement	Renewing kibbutz	
Mesilot	1938	Kibbutz Movement	Renewing kibbutz	
Metzer	1953	Kibbutz Movement	Renewing kibbutz	
Mevo Hama	1968	Kibbutz Movement	Renewing kibbutz	
Migdal Oz	1977	Religious Kibbutz Movement	Cooperative kibbutz	
Migvan	1987	Kibbutz Movement	Renewing kibbutz	
Misgav Am	1946	Kibbutz Movement	Renewing kibbutz	
Mishmar David	1948		Renewing kibbutz	Community settlement since 2003
Mishmar HaEmek	1922	Kibbutz Movement	Cooperative kibbutz	
Mishmar HaNegev	1946	Kibbutz Movement	Renewing kibbutz	
Mishmar HaSharon	1924	Kibbutz Movement	Renewing kibbutz	
Mizra	1923	Kibbutz Movement	Renewing kibbutz	
Na'an	1930	Kibbutz Movement	Cooperative kibbutz	
Nahal Oz	1951	Kibbutz Movement	Renewing kibbutz	
Nahsholim	1948		Renewing kibbutz	
Neot Mordechai	1946	Kibbutz Movement	Renewing kibbutz	
Neot Smadar	1989	Kibbutz Movement	Cooperative kibbutz	
Netiv HaLamed-Heh	1949	Kibbutz Movement	Renewing kibbutz	
Netzarim	1984		Renewing kibbutz	
Netzer Sereni	1948	Kibbutz Movement	Cooperative kibbutz	
Neve Eitan	1938	Kibbutz Movement	Renewing kibbutz	
Neve Harif	1987	Kibbutz Movement	Renewing kibbutz	
Neve Ilan	1978	Kibbutz Movement	Renewing kibbutz	
Neve Ur	1948	Kibbutz Movement	Renewing kibbutz	
Neve Yam	1939	Kibbutz Movement	Renewing kibbutz	
Nir Am	1949	Kibbutz Movement	Renewing kibbutz	
Nir David	1936	Kibbutz Movement	Renewing kibbutz	
Nir Eliyahu	1950	Kibbutz Movement	Renewing kibbutz	
Nir Oz	1955	Kibbutz Movement	Cooperative kibbutz	
Nir Yitzhak	1949	Kibbutz Movement	Renewing kibbutz	
Nirim	1946	Kibbutz Movement	Renewing kibbutz	
Nitzanim	1951	Kibbutz Movement	Renewing kibbutz	
Or HaNer	1957	Kibbutz Movement	Renewing kibbutz	
Ortal	1978	Kibbutz Movement	Cooperative kibbutz	
Palmachim	1949	Kibbutz Movement	Renewing kibbutz	
Parod	1949	Kibbutz Movement	Renewing kibbutz	
Pelekh	1982	Kibbutz Movement	Renewing kibbutz	
Ramat David	1926	Kibbutz Movement	Renewing kibbutz	
Ramat HaKovesh	1932	Kibbutz Movement	Renewing kibbutz	
Ramat HaShofet	1941	Kibbutz Movement	Renewing kibbutz	
Ramat Rachel	1925	Kibbutz Movement	Cooperative kibbutz	
Ramat Yohanan	1931	Kibbutz Movement	Cooperative kibbutz	
Ramot Menashe	1948	Kibbutz Movement	Renewing kibbutz	
Ravid	1981	Kibbutz Movement	Cooperative kibbutz	
Regavim	1948	Kibbutz Movement	Renewing kibbutz	
Re'im	1949	Kibbutz Movement	Cooperative kibbutz	
Reshafim	1948	Kibbutz Movement	Renewing kibbutz	
Retamim	1983	Non-affiliated religious kibbutz	Cooperative kibbutz	
Retamim	1988	Kibbutz Movement	Renewing kibbutz	
Revadim	1947	Kibbutz Movement	Renewing kibbutz	
Revivim	1943	Kibbutz Movement	Cooperative kibbutz	
Rosh HaNikra	1949	Kibbutz Movement	Renewing kibbutz	
Rosh Tzurim	1969	Religious Kibbutz Movement	Renewing kibbutz	
Ruhama	1944	Kibbutz Movement	Renewing kibbutz	
Sa’ad	1947	Religious Kibbutz Movement	Renewing kibbutz	
Sa'ar	1948	Kibbutz Movement	Renewing kibbutz	
Samar	1976	Kibbutz Movement	Cooperative kibbutz	
Sarid	1926	Kibbutz Movement	Renewing kibbutz	
Sasa	1949	Kibbutz Movement	Cooperative kibbutz	
Sde Boker	1952	Kibbutz Movement	Cooperative kibbutz	
Sde Eliyahu	1939	Religious Kibbutz Movement	Cooperative kibbutz	
Sde Nahum	1937	Kibbutz Movement	Renewing kibbutz	
Sde Nehemia	1940	Kibbutz Movement	Renewing kibbutz	
Sde Yoav	1956	Kibbutz Movement	Renewing kibbutz	
Sdot Yam	1940	Kibbutz Movement	Cooperative kibbutz	
Sha'alvim	1951	Non-affiliated religious kibbutz	Renewing kibbutz	
Sha'ar HaAmakim	1935	Kibbutz Movement	Renewing kibbutz	
Sha'ar HaGolan	1937	Kibbutz Movement	Cooperative kibbutz	
Shamir	1944	Kibbutz Movement	Renewing kibbutz	
Shefayim	1935	Kibbutz Movement	Cooperative kibbutz	
Shluhot	1948	Religious Kibbutz Movement	Cooperative kibbutz	
Shomrat	1948	Kibbutz Movement	Renewing kibbutz	
Shoval	1946	Kibbutz Movement	Renewing kibbutz	
Snir	1967	Kibbutz Movement	Renewing kibbutz	
Sufa	1975	Kibbutz Movement	Renewing kibbutz	
Tamuz	1987	Kibbutz Movement	Renewing kibbutz	
Tel Katzir	1949	Kibbutz Movement	Renewing kibbutz	
Tel Yitzhak	1938	Kibbutz Movement	Renewing kibbutz	
Tel Yosef	1921	Kibbutz Movement	Renewing kibbutz	
Tirat Zvi	1937	Religious Kibbutz Movement	Renewing kibbutz	
Tlalim	1980	Kibbutz Movement	Renewing kibbutz	
Tuval	1981	Kibbutz Movement	Renewing kibbutz	
Tze'elim	1947	Kibbutz Movement	Cooperative kibbutz	
Tzivon	1980	Kibbutz Movement	Renewing kibbutz	
Tzora	1948	Kibbutz Movement	Renewing kibbutz	
Tzova	1948	Kibbutz Movement	Cooperative kibbutz	
Urim	1946	Kibbutz Movement	Cooperative kibbutz	
Usha	1937	Kibbutz Movement	Renewing kibbutz	
Yad Hannah	1950	Kibbutz Movement	Renewing kibbutz	
Yad Mordechai	1943	Kibbutz Movement	Cooperative kibbutz	
Yagur	1922	Kibbutz Movement	Cooperative kibbutz	
Yahad	1984	Kibbutz Movement	Renewing kibbutz	
Yahel	1976	Kibbutz Movement	Renewing kibbutz	
Yakum	1938, 1947		Renewing kibbutz	
Yasur	1949	Kibbutz Movement	Renewing kibbutz	
Yehiam	1946	Kibbutz Movement	Renewing kibbutz	
Yifat	1954	Kibbutz Movement	Renewing kibbutz	
Yiftah	1948	Kibbutz Movement	Renewing kibbutz	
Yiron	1949	Kibbutz Movement	Cooperative kibbutz	
Yizre'el	1948	Kibbutz Movement	Cooperative kibbutz	
Yotvata	1957	Kibbutz Movement	Cooperative kibbutz	
Zikim	1949	Kibbutz Movement	Cooperative kibbutz	

== See also ==
- List of cities in Israel
- List of Moshavim
