= Nitzana =

Nitzana (Hebrew: נִצָּנָה) may refer to:

- Nessana, a city of the ancient Nabataeans located in the Negev desert in Israel
- Nitzana, Israel, a communal settlement near the ruins of the Nabataean city
- Nitzana Border Crossing, a border crossing between Israel and Egypt

== See also ==
- Ashdod Nitzanim Sand Dune Park
- Nitzan, a communal settlement in southern Israel located among the Nitzanim sand dunes north of Ashkelon
- Nitzanei Sinai, a communal settlement also known as Kadesh Barne'a after the Exodus station of that name.
