= Retamim =

Kibbutz in southern Israel

Retamim: רְתָמִים (Hebrew); رتميم (Arabic)
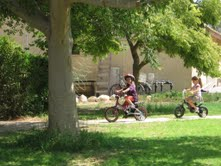

- Location within Northern Negev region of Israel
- Coordinates: 31°3′13″N 34°41′24″E
- Country: Israel
- District: Southern
- Subdistrict: Beersheba
- Council: Ramat HaNegev
- Affiliation: Kibbutz Movement
- Founded: 1983
- Founder: Demobilized IDF soldiers
- Population (2024): 817

Retamim (Hebrew: רְתָמִים) is a kibbutz in the central Negev desert in southern Israel. Located three kilometres northwest of Revivim, it falls under the jurisdiction of Ramat HaNegev Regional Council. In 2024 it had a population of 817.

== History ==
The community was founded by a group of demobilized IDF soldiers and new immigrants who started to gather in the kibbutz Be'eri in 1978. A second group was established in Revivim in early 1979. The two groups merged in mid-1979 and moved to a caravan site opposite Park Golda after Tlalim had moved to its permanent site in December 1979.

In 1983 the kibbutz was finally established on its present site, assisted by Nahal soldiers from the Hebrew Scouts. In 1994 it united with Kibbutz Revivim after suffering from social problems and members leaving. Some houses were converted into a holiday village called Rotem BeMidbar, though this closed in 2000. From 2002, it served as an immigrant absorption centre catering largely for immigrants from Ethiopia which closed in the fall of 2009.

In 2007, a religious nucleus began to form to settle the place, which settled temporarily in Tlalim. On August 16, 2009, the place was repopulated and became a religious community settlement with close to 150 families (as of spring 2024). The kibbutz is planned to grow to a population of about 300 families and be a central settlement in the Ramat HaNegev Regional Council.

In February 2024, a number of Bedouin intruders infiltrated the kibbutz, and were arrested by the civil defense squad. A member of the emergency squad shot one of them, Juma’a al-Danifri, dead. The shooter claimed self-defense, but his version contradicted other testimonies and investigation findings.

== Education ==
The Kibbutz is home to the Beit Ekstein Retamim school run by the Beit Ekstein Group. It is a therapeutic-desert themed school for teens (12-18) with emotional & mental health issues or disabilities.
