= Shalva BaMidbar =

Shalva BaMidbar: שלווה במדבר (Hebrew)
- Etymology: Peace in the Desert
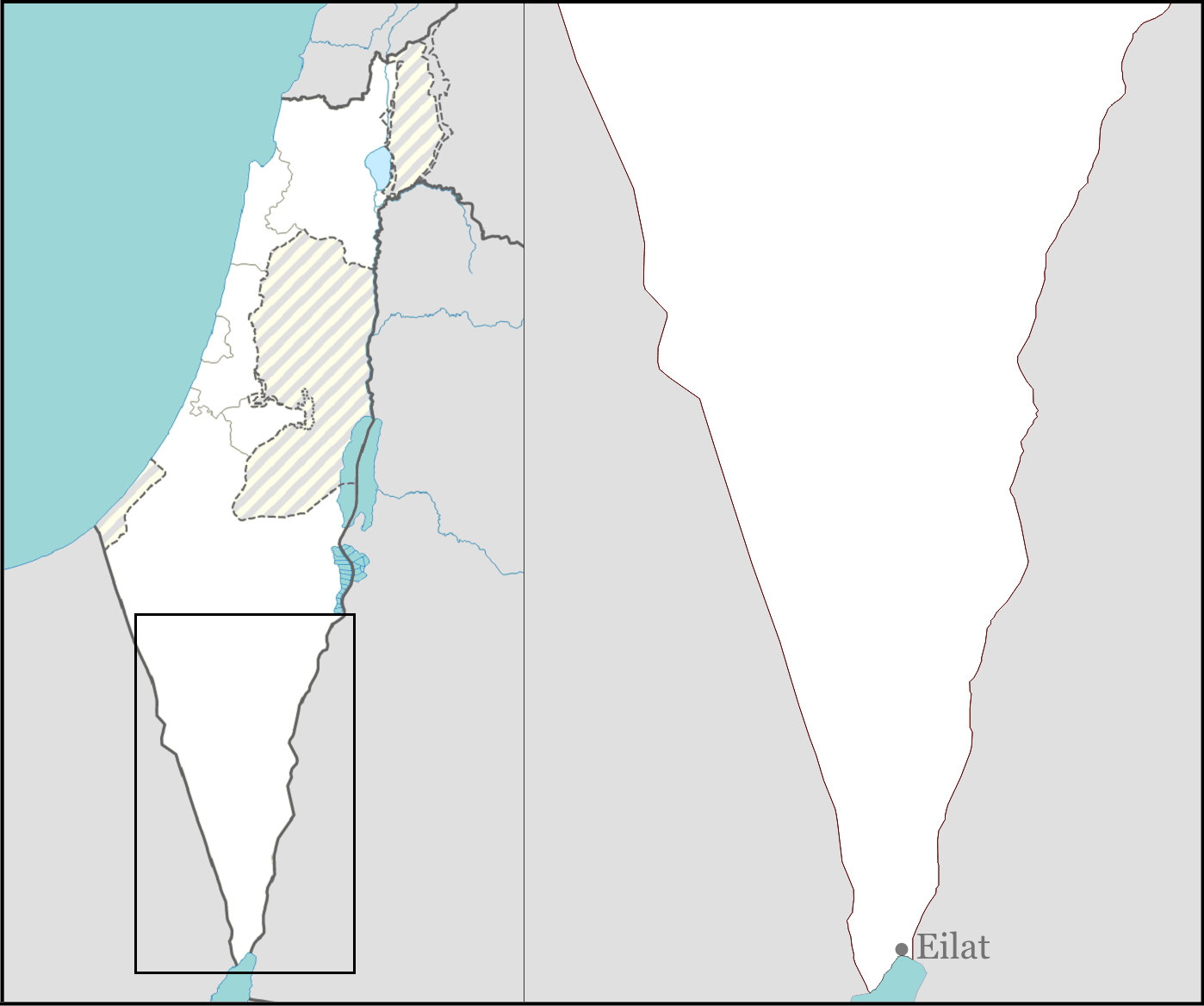
- Location within Southern Negev region of Israel Location within Israel
- Coordinates: 30°49′55″N 34°44′09″E
- Country: Israel
- District: Southern
- Subdistrict: Beersheba
- Council: Ramat HaNegev
- Founded: 2009
- Population (2019): 30

Shalva BaMidbar (Hebrew: שלווה במדבר, lit. Peace in the Desert), also known as Beit HaShanti BaMidbar (Hebrew: בית השנטי במדבר, Shanti House in the Desert) is a village in southern Israel. Located near Sde Boker, it falls under the jurisdiction of Ramat HaNegev Regional Council. In 2019 it had a population of 30.

The village was established in 2009, replicating the Shanti House model in Tel Aviv. It aims to help homeless youth return to a normal life. The village has an emphasis on green construction and also provides for children with special needs.

== Review ==
As part of the "Fact" program, Beit Shanti was criticized. Several boys who were in the house testified that they were evicted without a place to go and without the knowledge of the Ministry of Welfare, while a guide who was convicted of an indecent act as an adult continues to work there. Following the investigation, Klein was summoned to a hearing at the Ministry of Welfare. The summons letter states that the ministry believes that the institution does not meet a number of requirements, among them the employment of a number of permanent social workers according to the number of boys, having an orderly admission and departure procedure and a proper regulation of the number of instructors. The ministry also stated it was aware of the problems even before the investigation and that as a result, a number of professional controls were conducted at the institution.

It was decided by the Welfare Ministry to reduce the referral of boys to the institutions of Beit HaShanti, due to deficiencies in the care of the youth. In 2022 no boys and girls were referred to Beit Shanti in Tel Aviv, and only five boys were referred to Shalva BaMidbar.

In response to the testimonies that appeared on various networks regarding events at the institution, the management of Beit HaShanti threatened to file defamation lawsuits against the complainants.
