= Ruah Midbar =

Ruah Midbar: רוּחַ מִדְּבָּר (Hebrew)
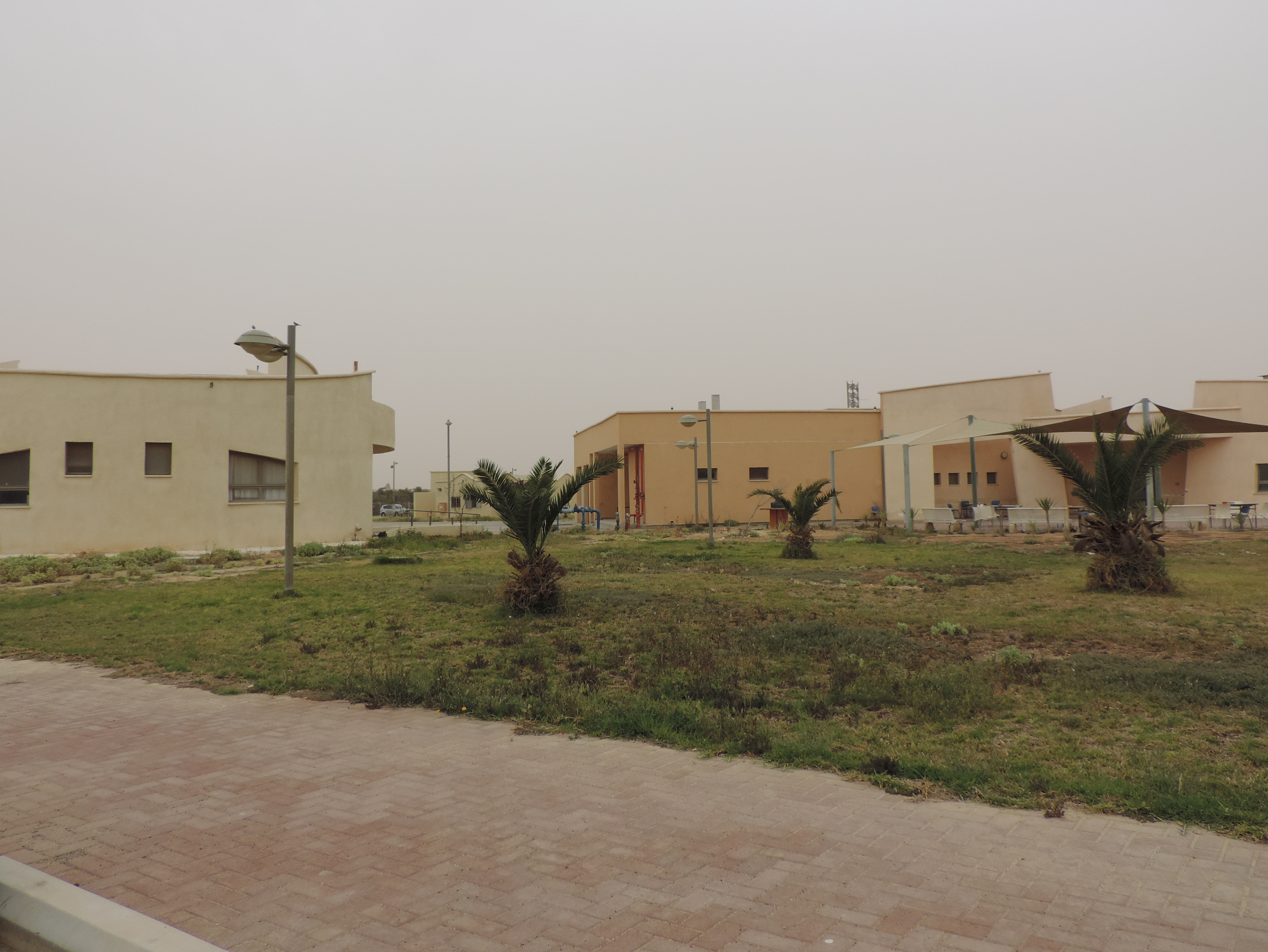
- Etymology: Desert wind
- Location within Northern Negev region of Israel Location within Israel
- Coordinates: 30°58′54″N 34°44′00″E
- Country: Israel
- District: Southern
- Council: Ramat HaNegev
- Founded: 2010
- Population (2024): 80

Ruah Midbar (Hebrew: רוּחַ מִדְּבָּר, lit. Desert Wind) is a rehabilitation centre in southern Israel. Located between Ashalim and Tlalim, it falls under the jurisdiction of Ramat HaNegev Regional Council. In 2024 its population was 80.

The centre was opened in 2010 as a collaboration between the regional council, the Anti-Drug Authority, the Jewish National Fund, Mifal HaPayis, the Rashi Foundation and several government departments. It serves people suffering from drug and alcohol addiction and eating disorders, and is run by the Yahadu Association.
