= Ashalim =

Community settlement in southern Israel

Ashalim: אשלים (Hebrew)
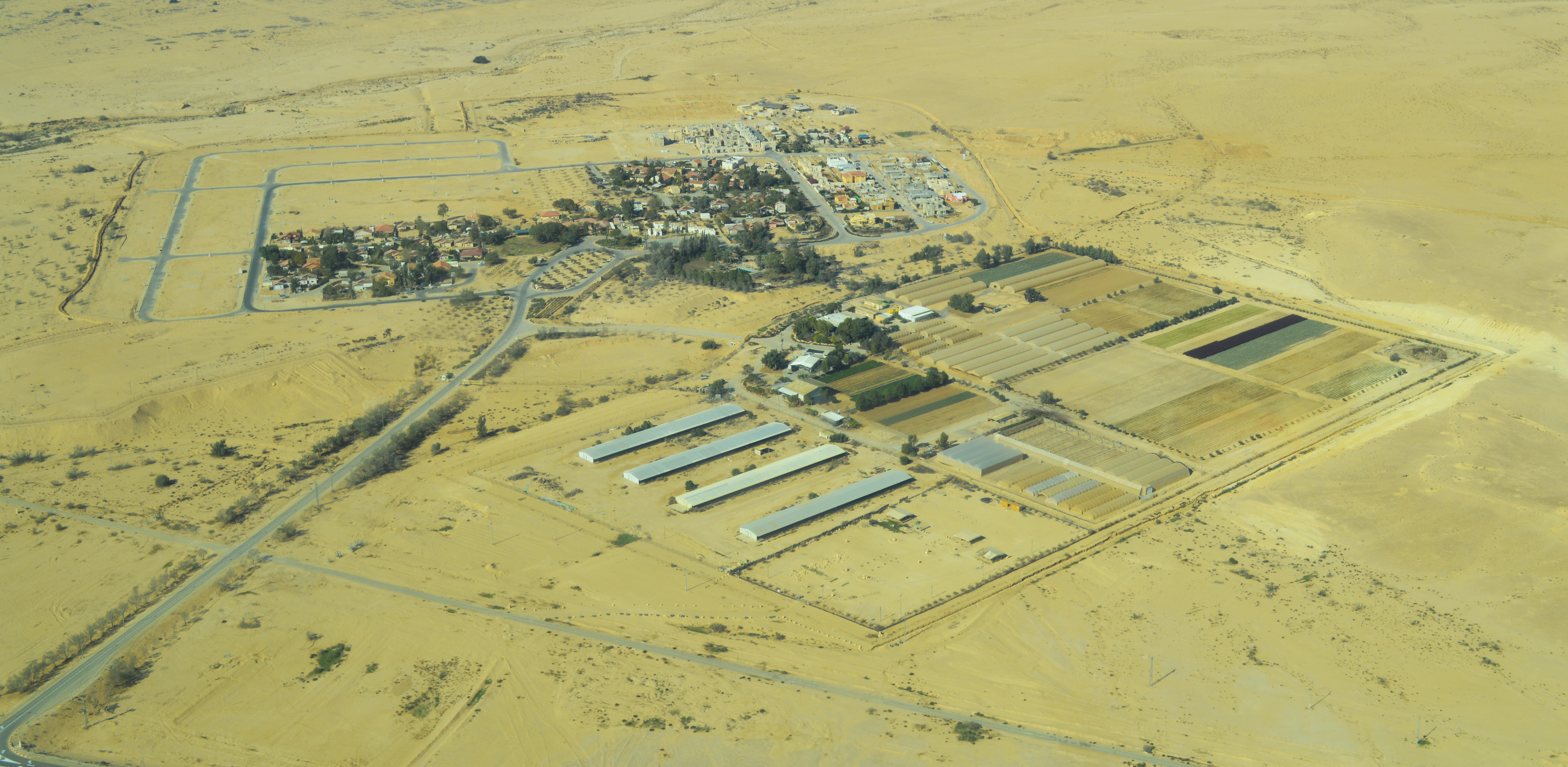

- Location within Northern Negev region of Israel Location within Israel
- Coordinates: 30°57′45″N 34°42′5″E
- Country: Israel
- District: Southern
- Subdistrict: Beersheba
- Council: Ramat HaNegev
- Founded: 1979
- Population (2024): 784

Ashalim (Hebrew: אשלים) is a small community settlement in southern Israel. Located in the Negev desert about 35 km south of Be'er Sheva and on the eastern side of Nahal Besor, the largest stream in the Negev, it falls under the jurisdiction of the Ramat HaNegev Regional Council. In 2024 its population was 784. Nearby settlements include Ezuz and Nitzana.

== History ==
The original village of Ashalim was one of three Nahal settlements founded between Mashabei Sadeh and Nitzana in 1956. The name itself means Tamarixes, a genus of shrubs and small trees.

The new Ashalim was founded as moshav shitufi in 1979 after moving from Bir Asluj Hill close to Golda Park, a nearby artificial lake. Today Ashalim functions as a community settlement.

In 2003 Kfar Adiel, a village for students of the Ben-Gurion University of the Negev, was founded near Ashalim by the Ayalim Association, whose objective is to establish settlements for students and small entrepreneurs in the Negev and the Galilee.

== Economy ==
Ashalim is one of a number of development sites for solar power in Israel. In 2008 construction began on three solar power plants near the settlement; two thermal and one photovoltaic. The 121MW Ashalim Power Station began producing power in 2018.
