= Kibbutz Beth-El =

Christian Kibbutz in Israel

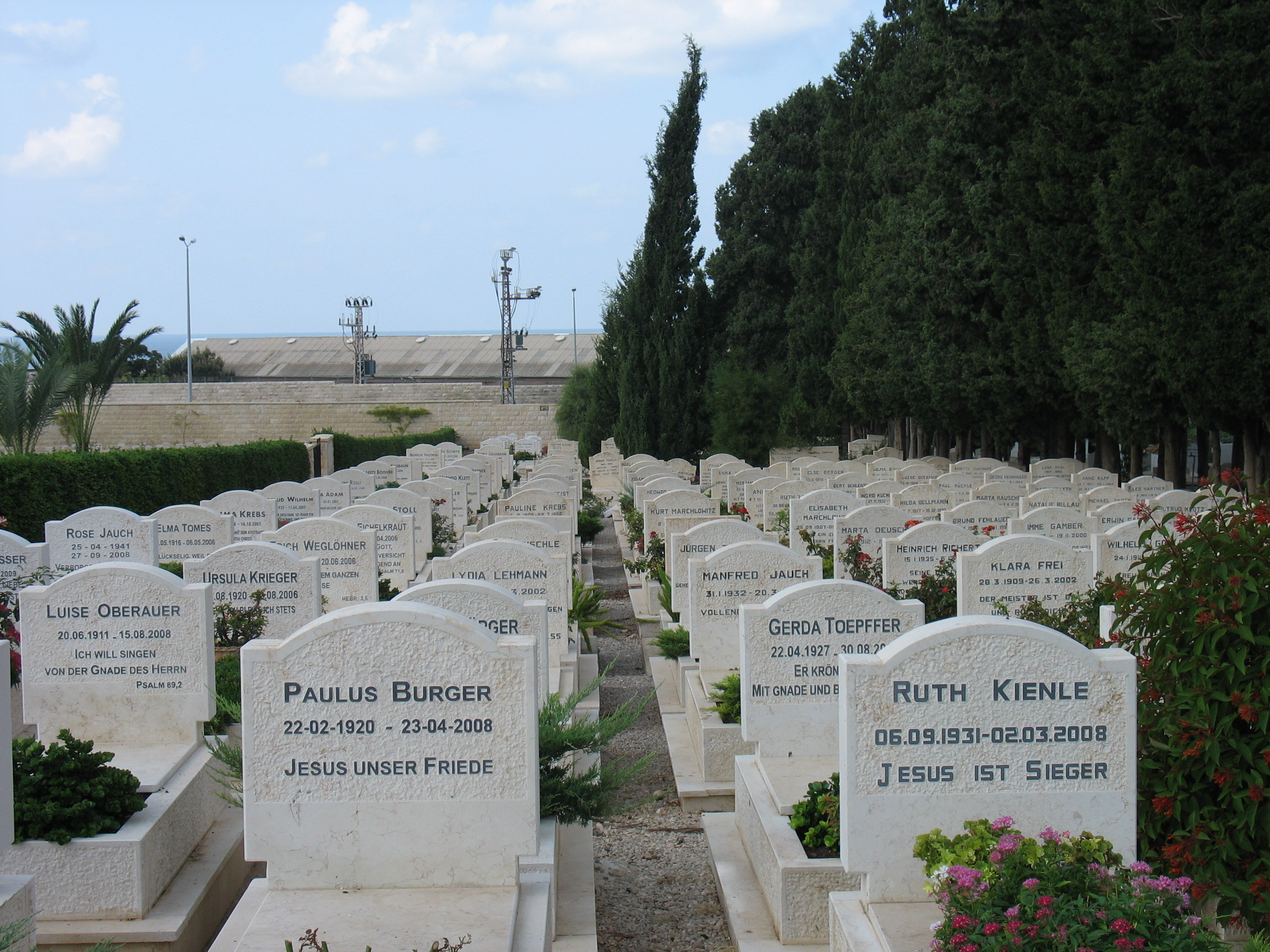
Emma Berger Cemetery

Kibbutz Beth-El is a German Protestant community in Zichron Ya'akov, Israel. In 2003, its population was 800.

Kibbutz Beth-El has its community roots in Stuttgart, Germany. Emma Berger, a Christian who became devout following her recovery from a serious illness, brought a group of followers to Israel in 1963 and purchased land in Zichron Yaakov.

== Economy ==
Beth-El Group owns seven factories and other businesses and is the second largest employer in Zichron Ya'akov after the local council.

Beth El's "CBRN" ("Chemical, biological, radiological and nuclear") air-filtration system, a device for combating poisonous gases, can be operated by grid electricity, battery or manually in the event of an attack.

== See also ==
- List of kibbutzim
- Hakhshara
