= Ayalim =

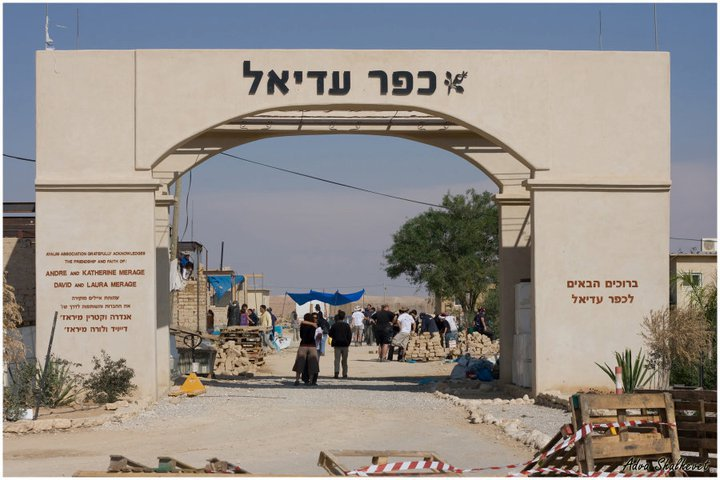
Entrance to Ayalim student village in Ashalim

Ayalim (Hebrew: איילים) is an Israeli nonprofit organisation that encourages young people to settle in the Negev and Galilee regions, founded in 2002. As of 2025, it operated "22 student villages and alumni communities, engaging 1,300 young Israelis annually." The organization is named in honor of Eyal and Yael Sorek, friends of the founders who were killed by Hamas at Karmei Tzur in 2002.

== Funding ==
Ayalim has received funding from the Israeli government, Keren Hayesod, the Jewish Federations of North America, the Jewish National Fund, and private donors. In 2015, half of its funding came from the Israeli government.
