= Kmehin =

Moshav in southern Israel

Kmehim: כְּמֵהִין (Hebrew)
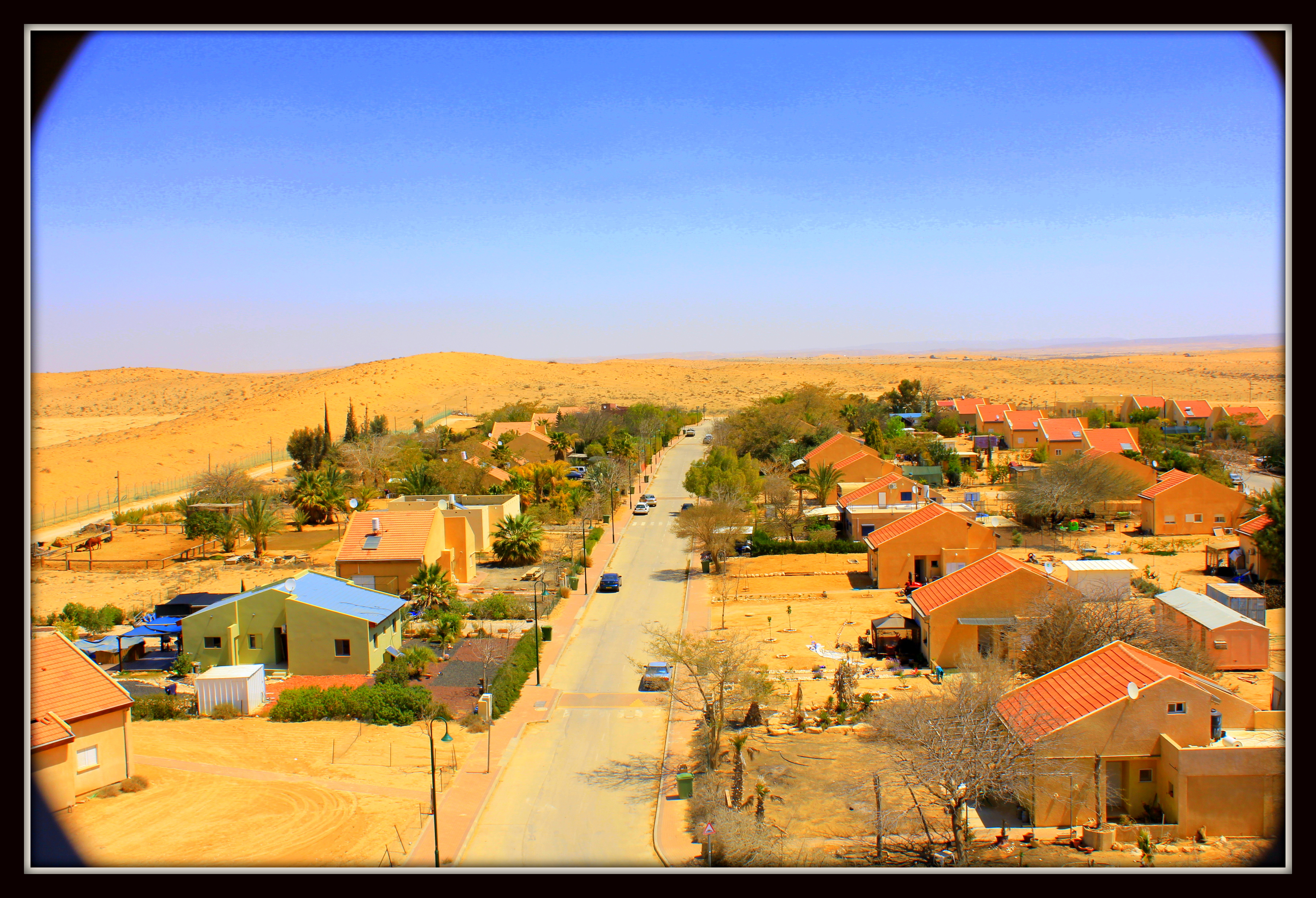
- Etymology: truffle
- Location within Northern Negev region of Israel Location within Israel
- Coordinates: 30°54′39″N 34°25′53″E
- Country: Israel
- District: Southern
- Subdistrict: Beersheba
- Council: Ramat HaNegev
- Affiliation: Moshavim Movement
- Founded: 1988
- Population (2024): 649

Kmehin (Hebrew: כְּמֵהִין, lit. 'Truffle') is a secular moshav in the western Negev desert in Israel. Located near Nitzana, it falls under the jurisdiction of Ramat HaNegev Regional Council. In 2024 it had a population of 649.

== History ==
The moshav was founded in 1988 and was named for the truffles that grow in the area. In 1992 it transformed from a moshav to moshav ovdim belonging to the Moshavim Movement; since then it has absorbed couples and young families.

== Facilities ==
The moshav has a library, an adult club, a children's club, the moshav secretariat, one playground and Derech Eretz semi-annual pre-military preparatory school.

== Economy ==
Most of the families in the moshav are engaged in agriculture. In many cases, the family combines farming and work in liberal professions (social work, tourism, engineering, law, education and teaching, economics).

Agriculture in the moshav is advanced agriculture and is intended for export. The main growing industry is cherry tomatoes in greenhouses. Irrigation using the existing brackish groundwater in the area prevents a shortage of water quotas. Also, it improves the quality of the crop. Other crops include spices, peppers and potatoes
