= Ezuz =

Community settlement in southern Israel

Ezuz: עזוז (Hebrew)
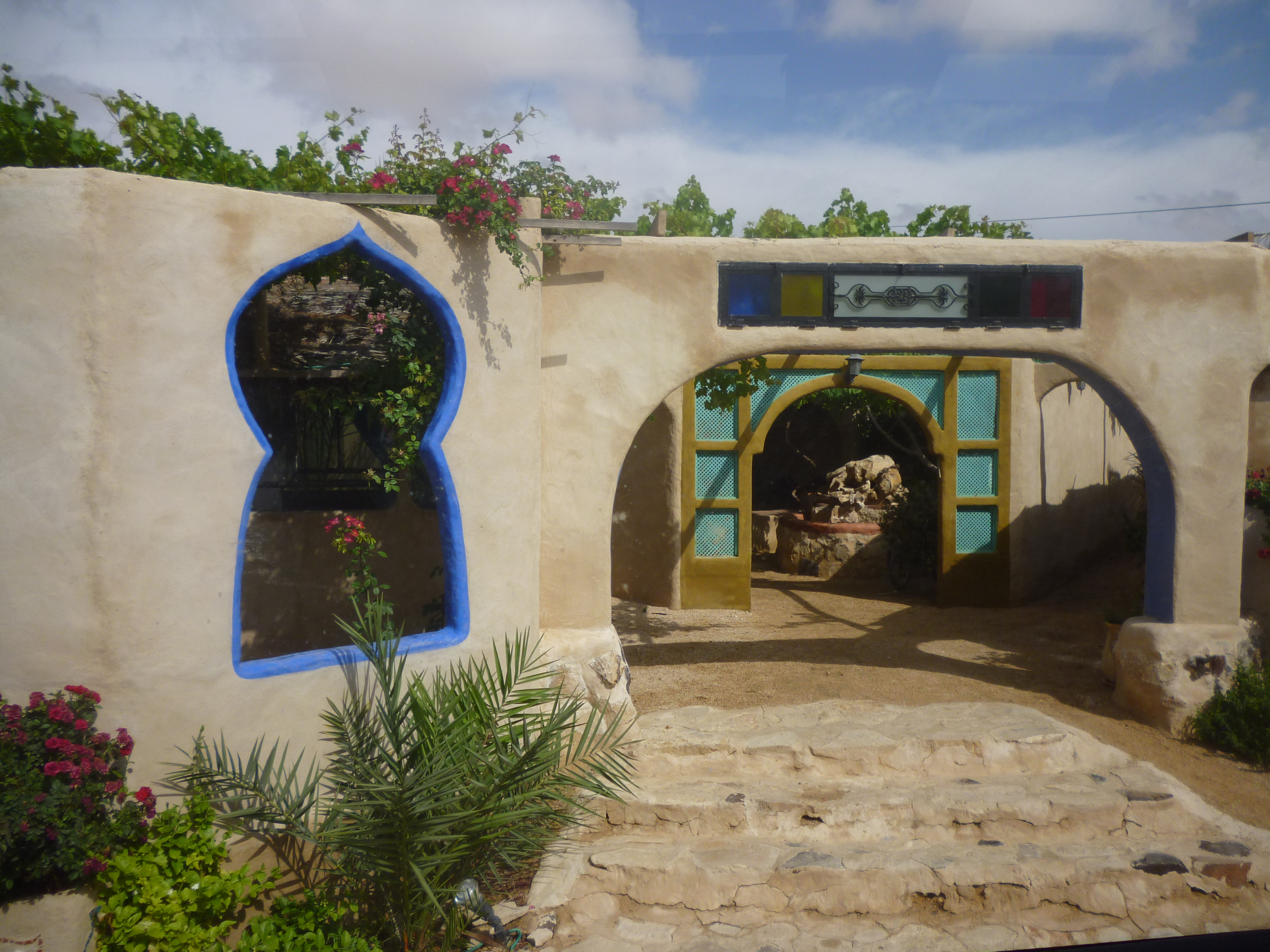

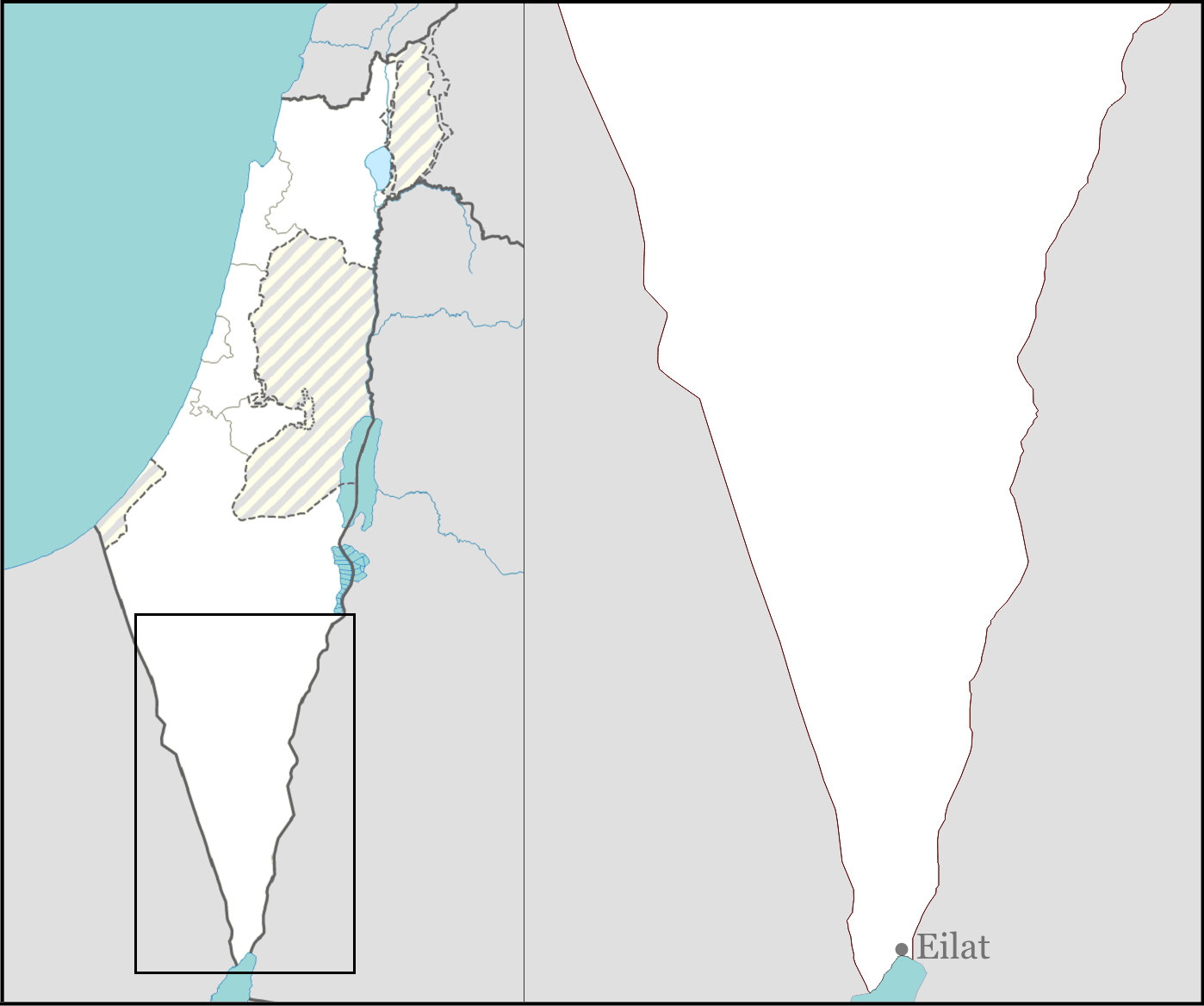
- Location within Southern Negev region of Israel Location within Israel
- Coordinates: 30°47′30″N 34°28′21″E
- Country: Israel
- District: Southern
- Subdistrict: Beersheba
- Council: Ramat HaNegev
- Founded: 1985
- Population (2024): 94

Ezuz (Hebrew: עזוז) is a small community settlement in the Negev desert of southern Israel. Named for Nahal Ezuz, a dry riverbed, it is located to the south of Nitzana and falls under the jurisdiction of the Ramat HaNegev Regional Council. In 2024 it had a population of 94.

== History ==
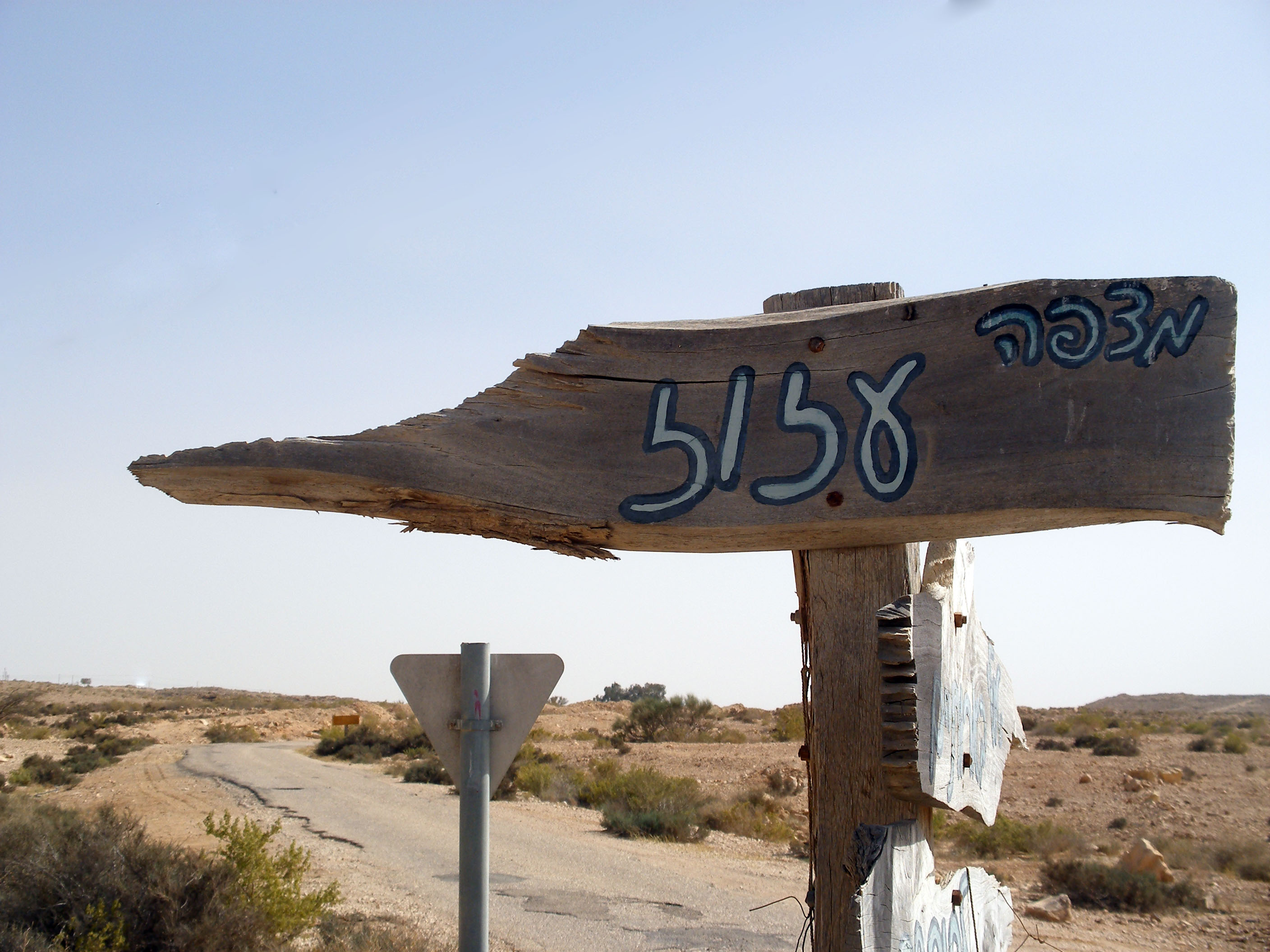
Entrance to Ezuz

The village was established on 19 March 1956 as a Nahal settlement, and was initially named Be'erotayim (בארותיים, lit. "Two Wells"), a translation of the Arabic name "Birin", that refers to Moshe's Well and Aharon's well; it was also referred to as Be'erotayim (BaNegev) to differentiate it from Be'erotayim in the centre of Israel. It was founded after the Egyptian army was removed from the demilitarized zone near Nitzana by Israeli forces in an attempt to strengthen defences next to the Egypt–Israel Border. While soldiers lived in Be'erotayim, they began growing foods including almonds, grain, sheep and cattle. At the end of the Six-Day War the village was abandoned as there was no need for a military presence in Nitzana after Israel had conquered the Sinai Peninsula.

The village was re-established as Ezuz in 1985, based on the agriculture created by the soldiers at the post. It is now the site of a traditionally-inspired farm project that uses ancient Nabataean floodwater capture techniques to raise a variety of fruits and vegetables with minimal external irrigation and no artificial fertilisation or pesticide. Residents of the village also raise livestock for local use, and produce goat cheese and organic olive oil. Tourism is an upcoming source of income. Most families provide bed and breakfast, there is a cafe, possibilities of (guided) camel or jeep tours and a hiking and biking route. Some residents are full or part-time artists.

== Geography ==
Ezuz is located in the middle of the Negev desert, near the border between Egypt and Israel above an oasis. The closest city is Beersheba, while the second closest city is Arish in Egypt.

== Archaeology ==
Two ancient wells, the Moshe Well and Aharon Well, were discovered under the settlement. Therefore the name of the place is also "Two Wells": in Hebrew: "Be'erotayim" and in Arabic: "Biriin". Today there is a small biblical park "Be'erotayim" around the 2 wells. Some connect it to the wells "be'erot" of Deuteronomy 10:6. Ezuz is not far from the historical, biblical Kadesh-Barnea (Deuteronomy 9:23) on the Egyptian side of the border. The Beerotayim area was partially surveyed by R.Cohen of the Israel Antiquities Authority in 1985. The Iron Age and Persian fortresses were excavated by Cohen in 1986.
