= Merhav Am =

Community settlement in southern Israel

Merhav Am: מֶרְחַב עַם (Hebrew)
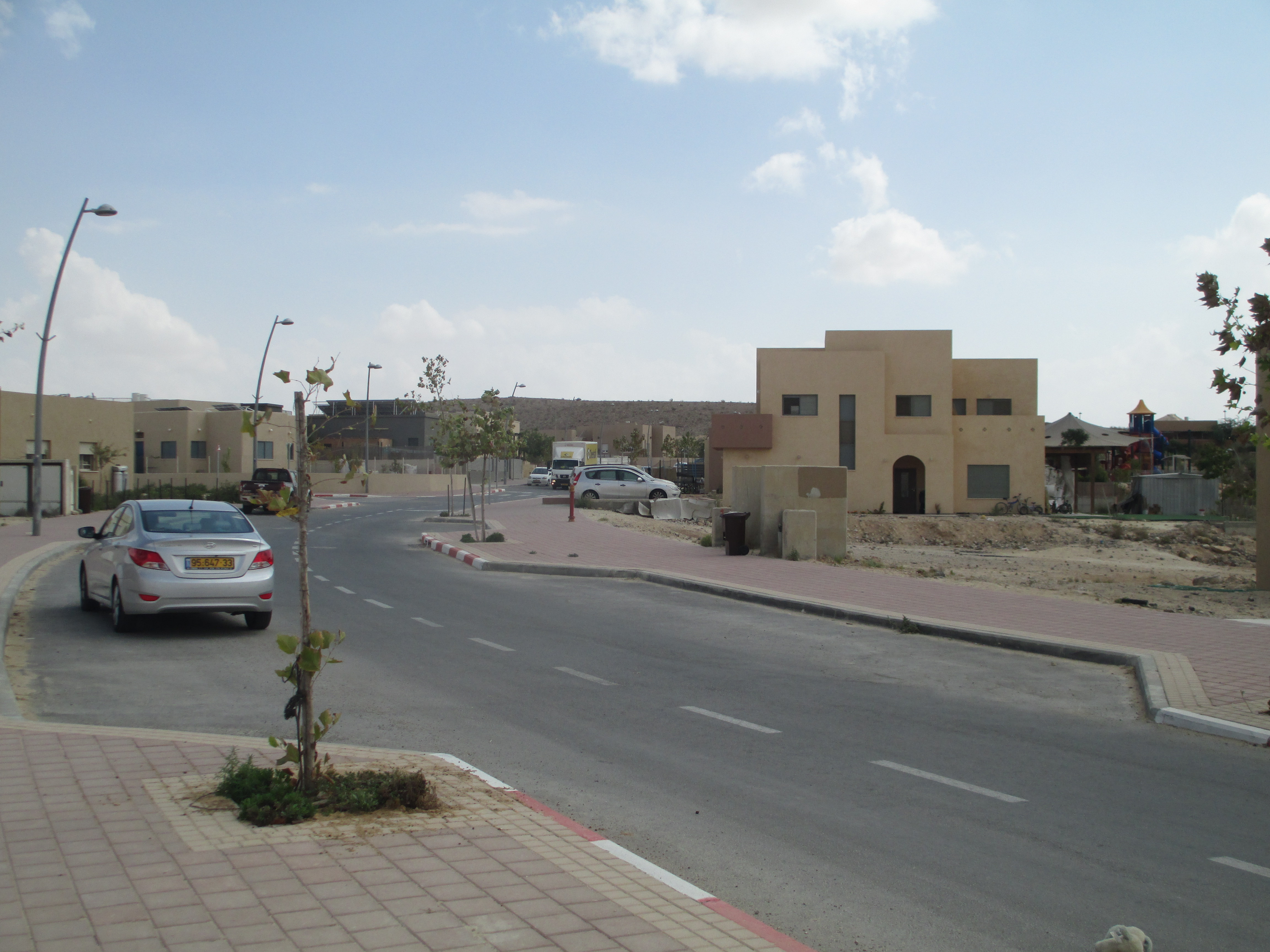
- Etymology: Nation's Expanse
- Location within Northern Negev region of Israel Location within Israel
- Coordinates: 30°53′14″N 34°49′44″E
- Country: Israel
- District: Southern
- Subdistrict: Beersheba
- Council: Ramat HaNegev
- Founded: 2001
- Founder: Or Movement
- Population (2024): 679

Merhav Am (Hebrew: מֶרְחַב עַם, lit. 'Nation's Expanse') is a religious community settlement in southern Israel. Located in the Negev desert between Yeruham and the kibbutz of Sde Boker, it falls under the jurisdiction of Ramat HaNegev Regional Council. In 2024 it had a population of 679.

== History ==
Merhav Am was founded by the Or Movement on 1 November 2001 and had a population of around 30 families by November 2006, many living in mobile homes.

The original name was intended to be Halukim due to its proximity to the Halukim Hills (the nearest road junction is called Halukim Junction). However, after around a year it was renamed Merhav Am, inspired by the wide open area in which it was to be built, as well as in honour of Rehavam Ze'evi, a former Minister who was assassinated in 2001: In Hebrew Merhav (מרחב - MRHV) means "wide open spaces" whilst Rehavam is spelled using the last three letters of the word plus two more (רחבעם - RHVAM). Combining the two gives Merhav Am (MRHV+AM).
