= Ramat HaNegev Regional Council =

Regional council in southern Israel

Coordinates: 30°52′N 34°47′E

Ramat HaNegev Regional Council מועצה אזורית רמת נגב
- Regional council (from 1954)
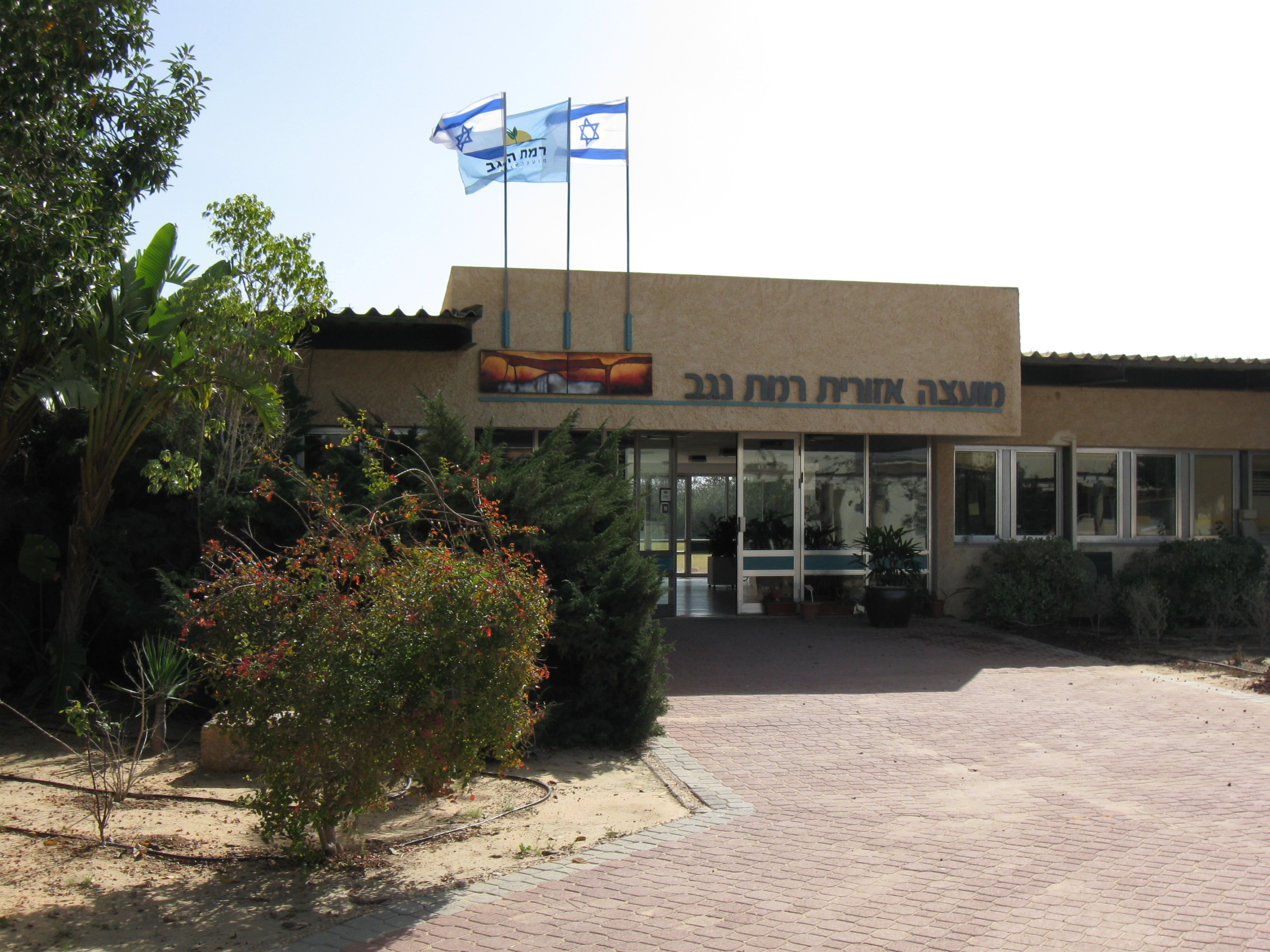

- Interactive map of Ramat HaNegev Regional Council
- Country: Israel
- District: Southern
- Subdistrict: Beersheba
- Natural region: Northern Negev Mountains

Government
  - Head of Municipality: Eran Doron

Area
  - Total: 4,099,240 dunams (4,099.24 km^{2}; 1,582.73 sq mi)

Population (2024)
  - Total: 9,125
  - Density: 2.226/km^{2} (5.765/sq mi)
- Website: en.rng.org.il

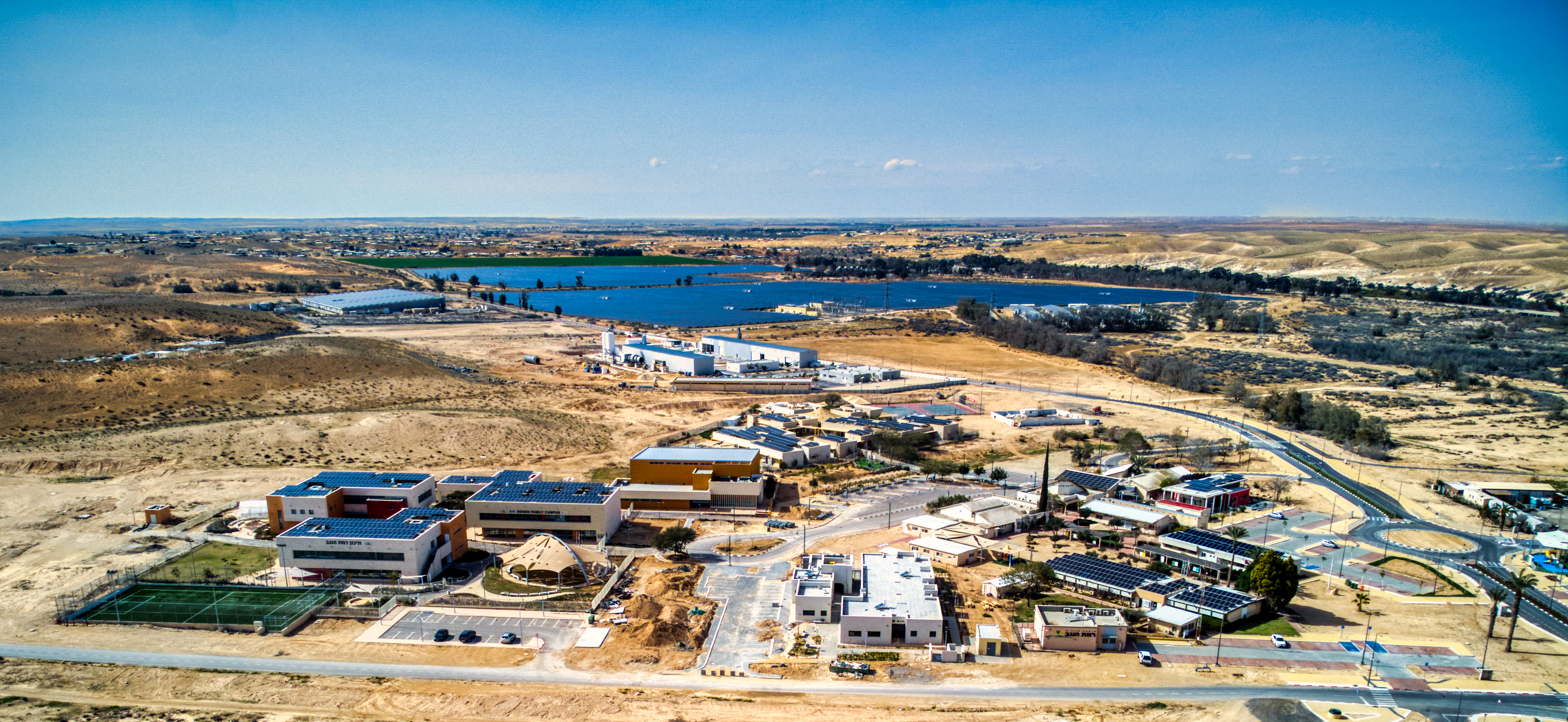
Ramat HaNegev Regional Council

Ramat HaNegev Regional Council (Hebrew: מועצה אזורית רמת הנגב, lit. 'Negev Heights Regional Council') is a regional council in the Negev desert in Israel. With around 8,000 residents spread across 20 villages, the council is geographically the largest in Israel, covering more than 20% of Israel's landmass. The council's headquarters are located on Highway 40 between Mashabei Sadeh and Tlalim.

== Geography ==
Ramat HaNegev is geographically the largest local authority area in Israel, covering over 4.3 million dunam, around 22% of Israel. The region is home to around 8,000 residents spread across 20 villages split between kibbutzim, moshavim, community settlements, an educational youth village and military bases, as well as 23 farms.

The council borders Central Arava Regional Council to the east, Hevel Eilot Regional Council to the south, Egypt to the west and Bnei Shimon Regional Council and Eshkol Regional Council to the north. Neve Midbar Regional Council and the local councils of Mitzpe Ramon and Yeruham are enclaves within Ramat HaNegev.

== History ==
The first Zionist pioneers who established Revivim in 1943 are considered the founding fathers of the region. Revivim was initially established as an agricultural experiment to study the land and climate to improve the working methods and increase production. In November 1947, kibbutz Halutza (the name later changed to its current name, Mashabei Sadeh) was established 10 kilometers northeast of Revivim. The two communities of Revivim and Mashabei Sadeh fought together to get a water pipeline, which would become the key lifelong that enabled the future expansion of the region's communities, such as Sde Boker, established in the early 1950s. While several other attempts were made to develop new Negev communities, they were eventually abandoned since they failed to receive the necessary funding as the region was not considered suitable for settlement.

The regional council of Ramat HaNegev was established in 1954 and included four communities in the beginning; Revivim, Mashabei Sadeh, Sde Boker and Kfar Yeruham (which became an independent council in 1959).

A fresh, vigorous movement to the Negev occurred in the early 1970s and accelerated following the Camp David agreements and the return of Sinai to Egypt. With the help of a campsite for temporary housing in the Mashabim junction, the first groups of settlers were able to move to the Negev, resettle, and establish new communities; Ashalim (1979), Tlalim (1980), Retamim (1983), Ezuz (1985), Nitzanei Sinai (1986) and Kmehin (1988).

Another wave began in the early 2000s when the Or Movement began directing mixed groups of religious and secular pioneers to the Negev. Merhav Am was established in 2001, Be'er Milka in 2006, and the new community of Retamim (abandoned by its original settlers) was repopulated in 2009. In 2012 the council approved the establishment of a new community, Ramat Tziporim, to provide homes for 2,000 Azzazmeh Bedouins living in the region. Sheizaf was officially recognized in 2020 by the authorities almost ten years of its initial founding.

== Tourism ==
Ramat HaNegev has several tourist attractions, including the ruins of cities on the incense trade route such as Avdat, Shivta (a Unesco World Heritage Site), the Nabataean city of Nitzana, and Halutza. The region also includes the makhteshim craters (Gadol, Katan and Ramon).

== Communities ==
Kibbutzim

- Mashabei Sadeh
- Retamim
- Revivim
- Sde Boker
- Tlalim

Moshavim

- Be'er Milka
- Kmehin

Community settlements

- Ashalim
- Ezuz
- Merhav Am
- Midreshet Ben-Gurion
- Nitzana
- Nitzanei Sinai
- Sheizaf

Other

- Ruah Midbar

== Demographics ==
Historical population
Year	Pop.	±%
1972	900	—
1983	1,300	+44.4%
1995	2,200	+69.2%
2008	4,320	+96.4%
2022	8,368	+93.7%
2024	9,125	+9.0%

== Voting Patterns ==
In the 2022 election, 74 percent of voters in the regional council voted for the parties of the center-left coalition led by Yair Lapid, while 25 percent voted for the parties of the right-wing coalition led by Benjamin Netanyahu and 0.9 percent voted for the Arab parties.

In the 2026 election, 67 percent of voters in the regional council voted for the parties of the center-left coalition led by Gadi Eisenkot, while 23 percent voted for the parties of the right-wing coalition led by Benjamin Netanyahu and 1 percent voted for the Arab parties. An additional 5 percent voted for the Reservists, and 3.4 percent voted for Amcha Yisrael. Voter turnout increased 25 percent from the 2022 election.

== Sister cities ==
- Boulder, Colorado, United States (since 2018)

== See also ==
- Ein Avdat
- Nahal Zin fuel leak
