= Sheizaf =

Sheizaf: שיזף (Hebrew)
- Location within Northern Negev region of Israel
- Coordinates: 31°00′06″N 34°45′56″E
- Country: Israel
- District: Southern
- Subdistrict: Beersheba
- Council: Ramat HaNegev
- Founded: 8 February 2012
- Population (2024): 137

Sheizaf (Hebrew: שיזף) is a mixed religious-secular community settlement in southern Israel. Located around 25 kilometres south of Beersheba, it falls under the jurisdiction of Ramat HaNegev Regional Council. In 2024 it had a population of 137.

== History ==
The village was founded on 8 February 2012 by ten families. Initially an unofficial settlement, it was declared illegal by a Beersheba District Court in November 2014 as it had been established on land planned for a student village, but Interior Minister Gideon Sa'ar overruled the decision and granted formal recognition to the village.
