= Mashabei Sadeh =

Kibbutz in southern Israel

Mashabei Sadeh: מַשְׁאַבֵּי שָׂדֶה (Hebrew); مشابي سادي (Arabic)
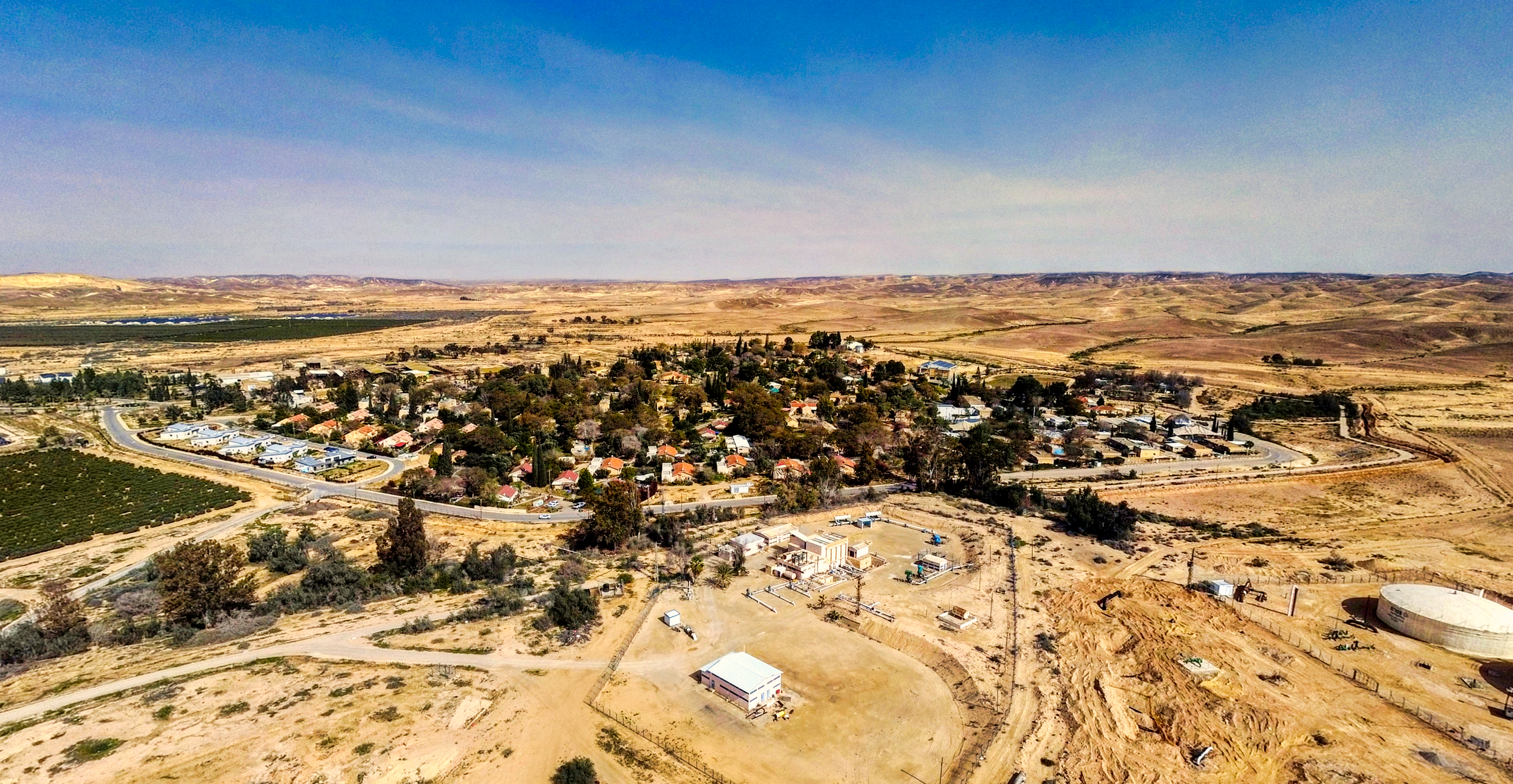

- Location within Northern Negev region of Israel Location within Israel
- Coordinates: 31°0′14″N 34°47′18″E
- Country: Israel
- District: Southern
- Subdistrict: Beersheba
- Council: Ramat HaNegev
- Affiliation: Kibbutz Movement
- Founded: 1947
- Founder: Palmach Veterans
- Population (2024): 562
- Website: www.m-sadeh.org.il

Mashabei Sadeh (Hebrew: מַשְׁאַבֵּי שָׂדֶה) is a kibbutz in southern Israel. Located in the Negev desert, it falls under the jurisdiction of Ramat HaNegev Regional Council. In 2024 it had a population of 562.

== History ==
The kibbutz was established in 1947 in the Elusa dunes and was originally known as Mashabim (Hebrew: משאבים, lit. 'Resources'). During the 1948 Arab–Israeli War the kibbutz was attacked by the Egyptian Army but was retained by Israel. After the war ended it relocated to its present site. It was renamed Mashabei Sadeh in honour of Palmach leader Yitzhak Sadeh, who died in 1952.

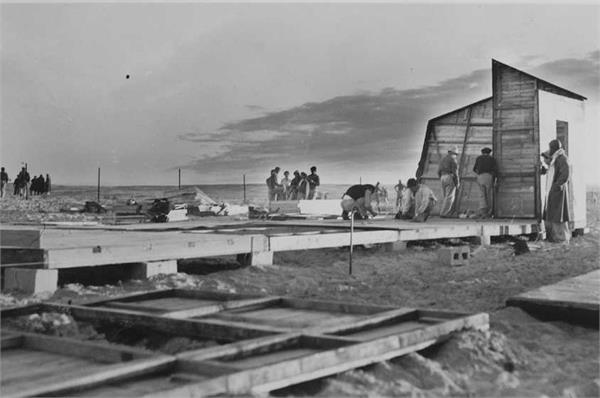
Halutza 1947

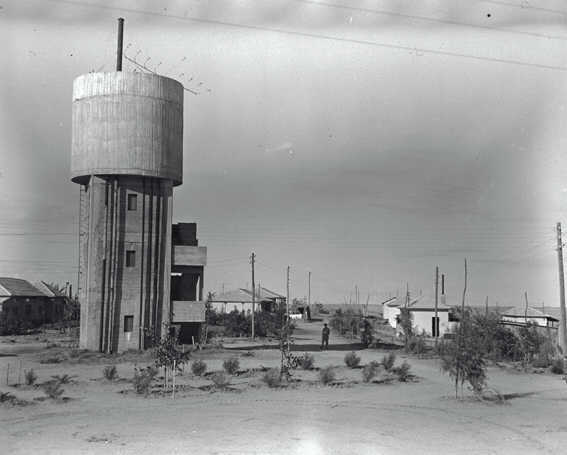
Halutza 1947

== Economy ==
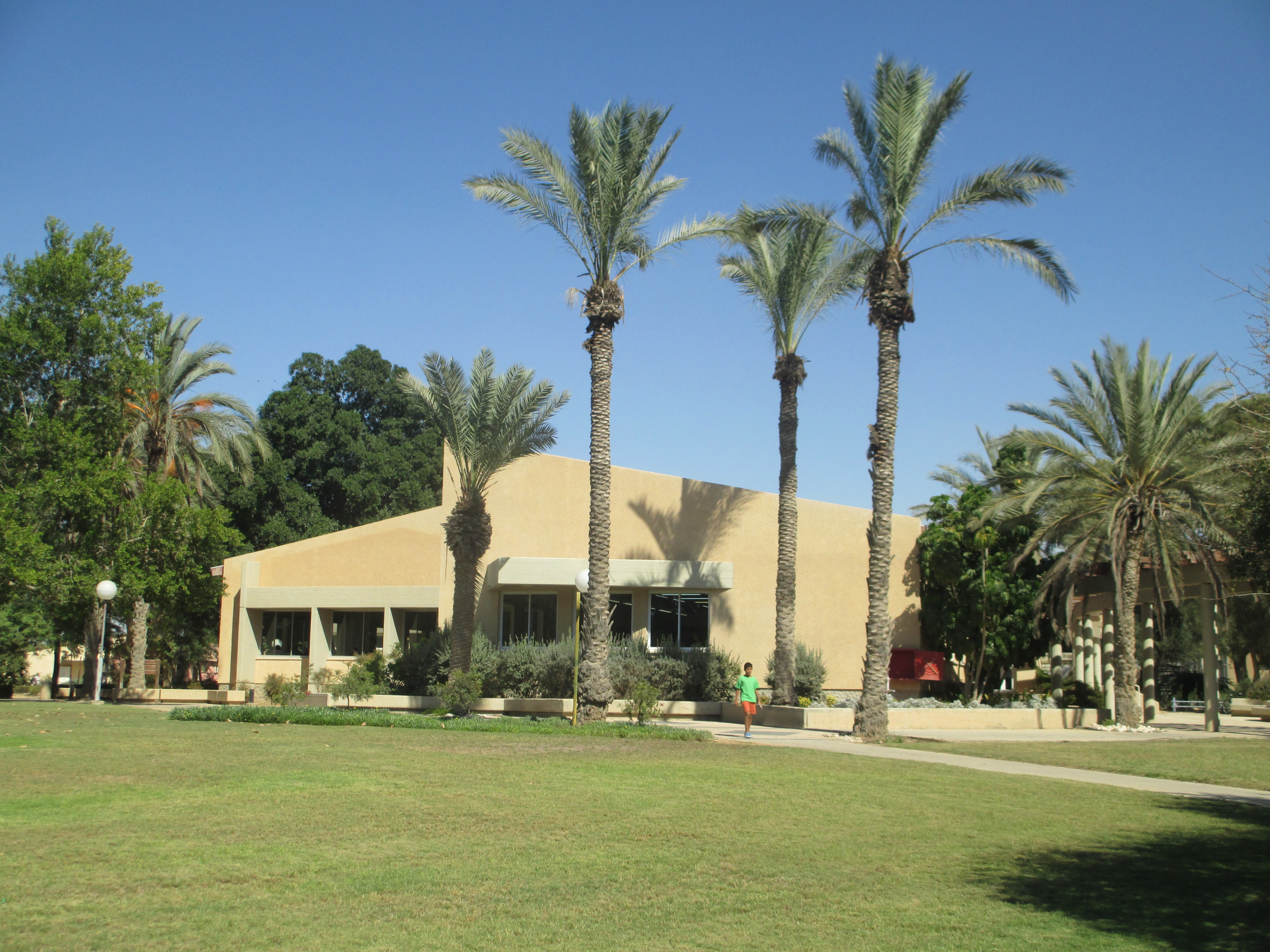
The dining hall

Apart from agriculture (field crops, poultry and dairy), the kibbutz breeds shrimp using special aquaculture techniques. It is also the only kibbutz in Israel to breed the Australian fish barramundi. It also operates a factory, Sagiv, that produces brass ball-valves and fittings, and runs a guesthouse.
