= Nitzanei Sinai =

Israeli village in Ramat HaNegev Regional Council

Nitzanei Sinai: ניצני סיני (Hebrew); نتسانا سيناء (Arabic)

Hebrew transcription(s)
  - Official: Nizzane Sinay
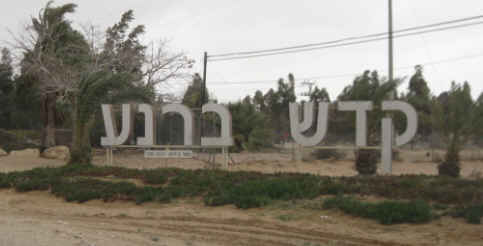
- Sign at entrance reading "Kadesh Barnea"

- Location within Northern Negev region of Israel Location within Israel
- Coordinates: 30°54′13″N 34°23′47″E
- Country: Israel
- District: Southern
- Subdistrict: Beersheba
- Council: Ramat HaNegev
- Affiliation: Moshavim Movement
- Founded: 1977
- Population (2024): 949

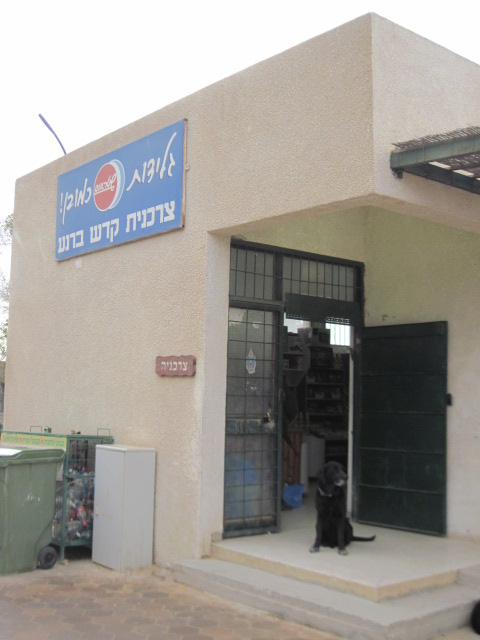
Main general store

Nitzanei Sinai (Hebrew: נִצָּנֵי סִינַי or ניצני סיני), also known as Kadesh Barnea (קָדֵשׁ בַּרְנֵעַ), is a community settlement in the western Negev desert in Israel. Located near Nitzana, it falls under the jurisdiction of Ramat HaNegev Regional Council. In 2024 it had a population of 949.

== History ==
The settlement was acquired by Israel in 1980 and moved to its present site in 1986 following the Egypt–Israel peace treaty. It was named for its proximity to the Sinai, as well as after biblical Kadesh Barnea, one of the stations on the Israelites' journey during the Exodus.

== Olive cultivar ==
Barnea is a modern dual-purpose olive cultivar bred originally from Kadesh Barnea in southern Israel to be disease-resistant and to produce a generous crop. The oil has a strong flavour with a hint of green leaf. Barnea is widely grown in Israel (especially in the south) and in the southern hemisphere, particularly in Australia and New Zealand.
