= Revivim =

Kibbutz in southern Israel

Revivim: רְבִיבִים (Hebrew); رفيفيم (Arabic)
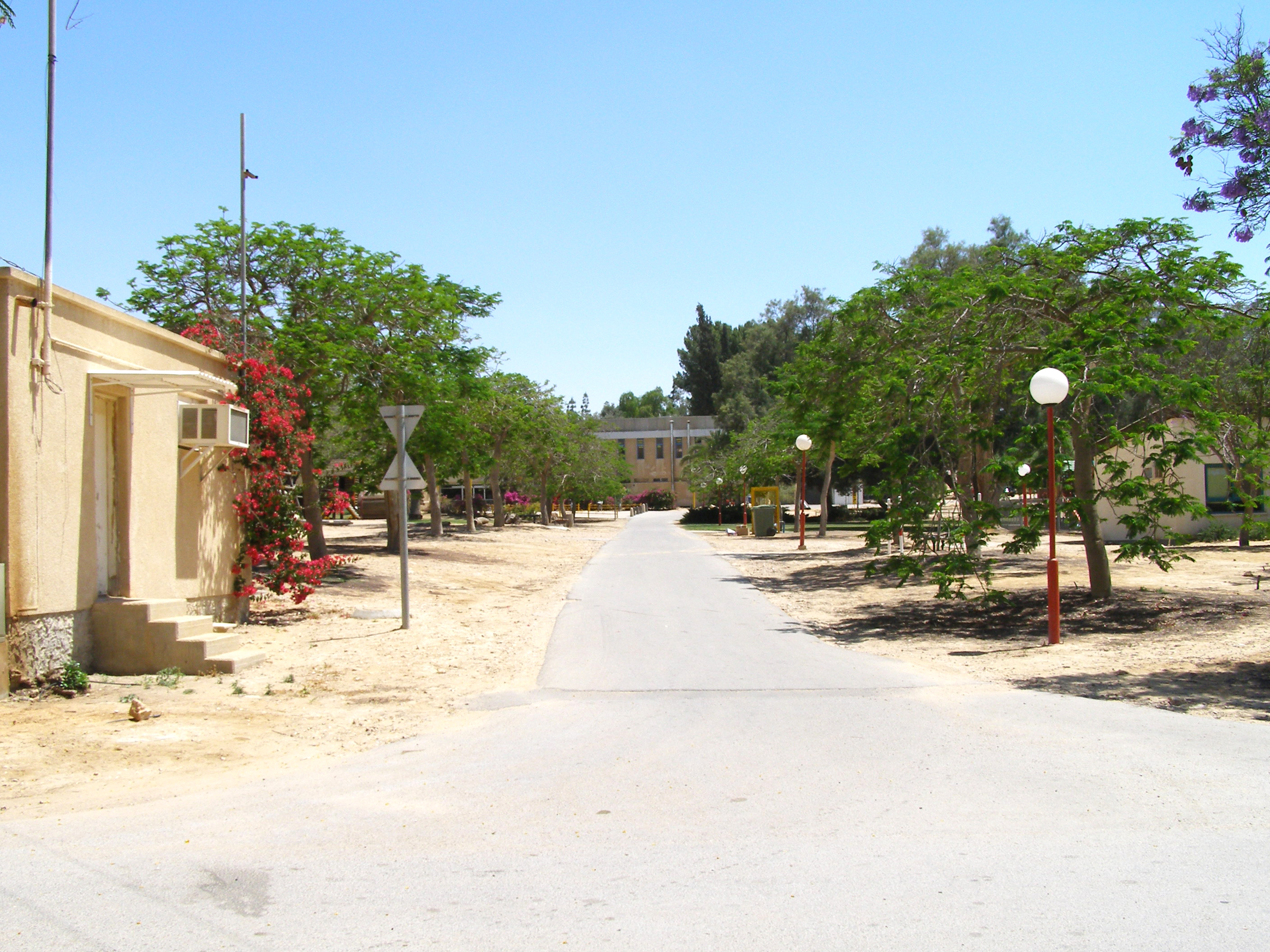
- Etymology: Rainshowers
- Location within Northern Negev region of Israel Location within Israel
- Coordinates: 31°2′37″N 34°43′16″E
- Country: Israel
- District: Southern
- Subdistrict: Beersheba
- Council: Ramat HaNegev
- Affiliation: Kibbutz Movement
- Founded: 7 July 1943
- Founder: Italian Noar HaOved Members
- Population (2024): 868
- Website: www.revivim.org.il

Revivim (Hebrew: רְבִיבִים, lit. '(rain) showers') is a kibbutz in the Negev desert in southern Israel. Located around half an hour south of Beersheba, it falls under the jurisdiction of Ramat HaNegev Regional Council. In 2024 it had a population of 868.

== History ==
=== 1943 establishment ===
The community was formed in 1943 in Rishon LeZion with help from the UK government by young Jewish refugees (olim) from Austria, Italy and Germany, all of whom were members of HaNoar HaOved VeHaLomed who had been educated at kibbutz Givat Brenner.

The kibbutz itself was established on 7 July 1943, as one of the "three lookouts" of the northern Negev, and was initially named Tel HaTzofim (lit. Scout's Hill). It was later renamed Revivim* by Berl Katznelson after the magazine edited by Yosef Haim Brenner (for whom Givat Brenner was named), and its name is also taken from the Bible, Psalm 65:11: "You (Lord) ... level its ridges, you soften it with showers."

*The name Revivim was given to the group by Berel Katznelson, who sought in this way to emphasize the affinity of the core of the group (which received its training at Kibbutz Givat Brenner) to the writer Yosef Haim Brenner, who at the time edited a journal called "Revivim".

=== 1948 war ===
During the 1948 Arab–Israeli War, Revivim fell behind Egyptian lines for several months. Members of the kibbutz lived in underground dugouts, and received food supplies by air and convoys that ran the Egyptian battle lines. Thirty members of the kibbutz survived the war, while eight were killed in raids and pitched battles with Egyptian forces.

==== Mizpe Revivim 1948 museum ====
Near the kibbutz stands Mizpe Revivim (lit. Revivim lookout), a museum depicting the history of the "lookout" observer points and the events of the 1948 war in the northern Negev.

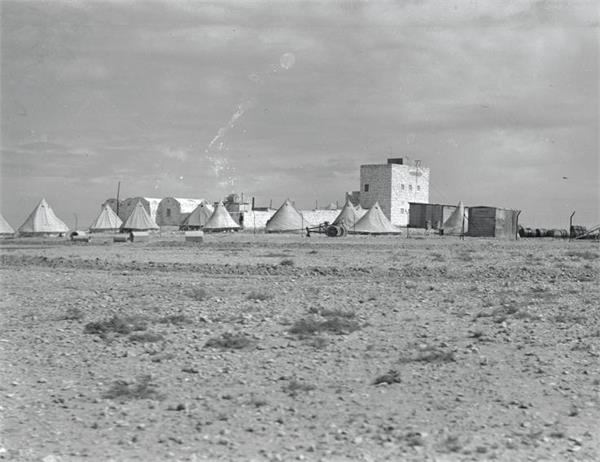
Revivim 1945

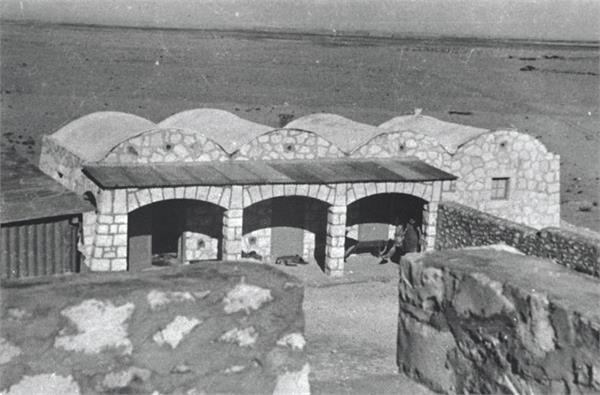
Revivim 1945

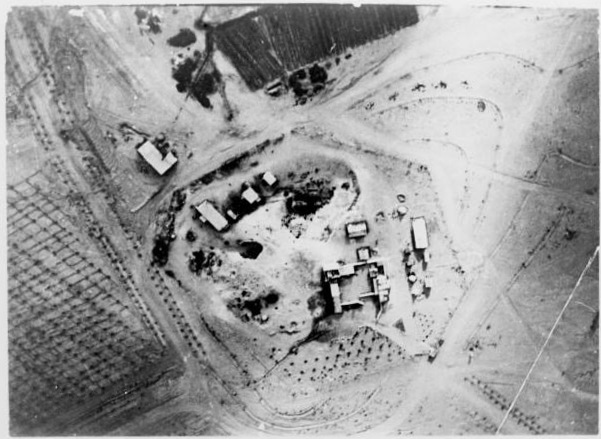
Kibbutz Revivim 1947

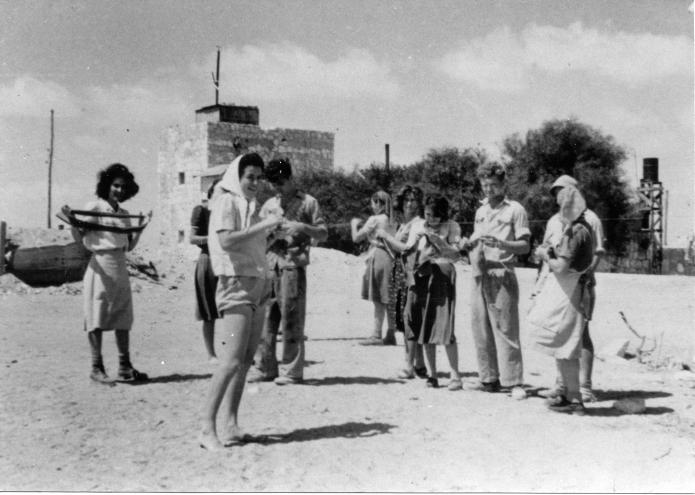
Revivim. 1948

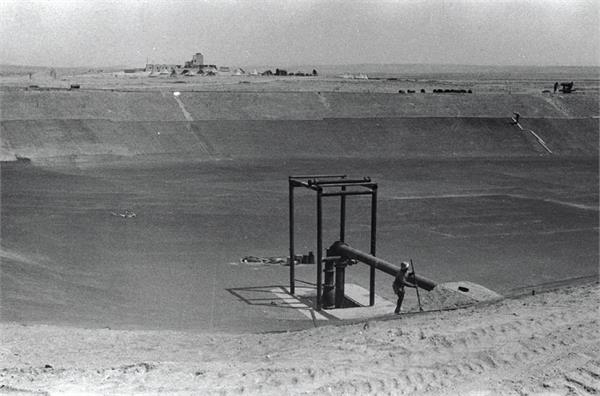
Revivim reservoir 1946

== Economy ==
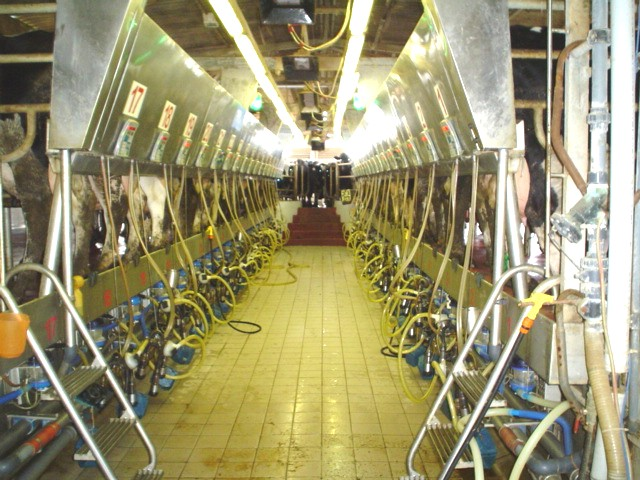
Revivim milking parlor

Revivim's economy is based on agriculture, including olive groves (irrigated with brackish water), a large dairy farm and a chicken hatchery. Aside from agriculture, Revivim has interests in a variety of industries including an injection moulding company ("Raviv") and a company that designs and produces valves for automotive fuel systems ("Raval").

== Notable people ==
- Golda Meir, late Prime Minister of Israel

== See also ==
- 11 points in the Negev, Zionist settlement project
