= Tlalim =

Kibbutz in Southern Israel

Tlalim: טְלָלִים (Hebrew)
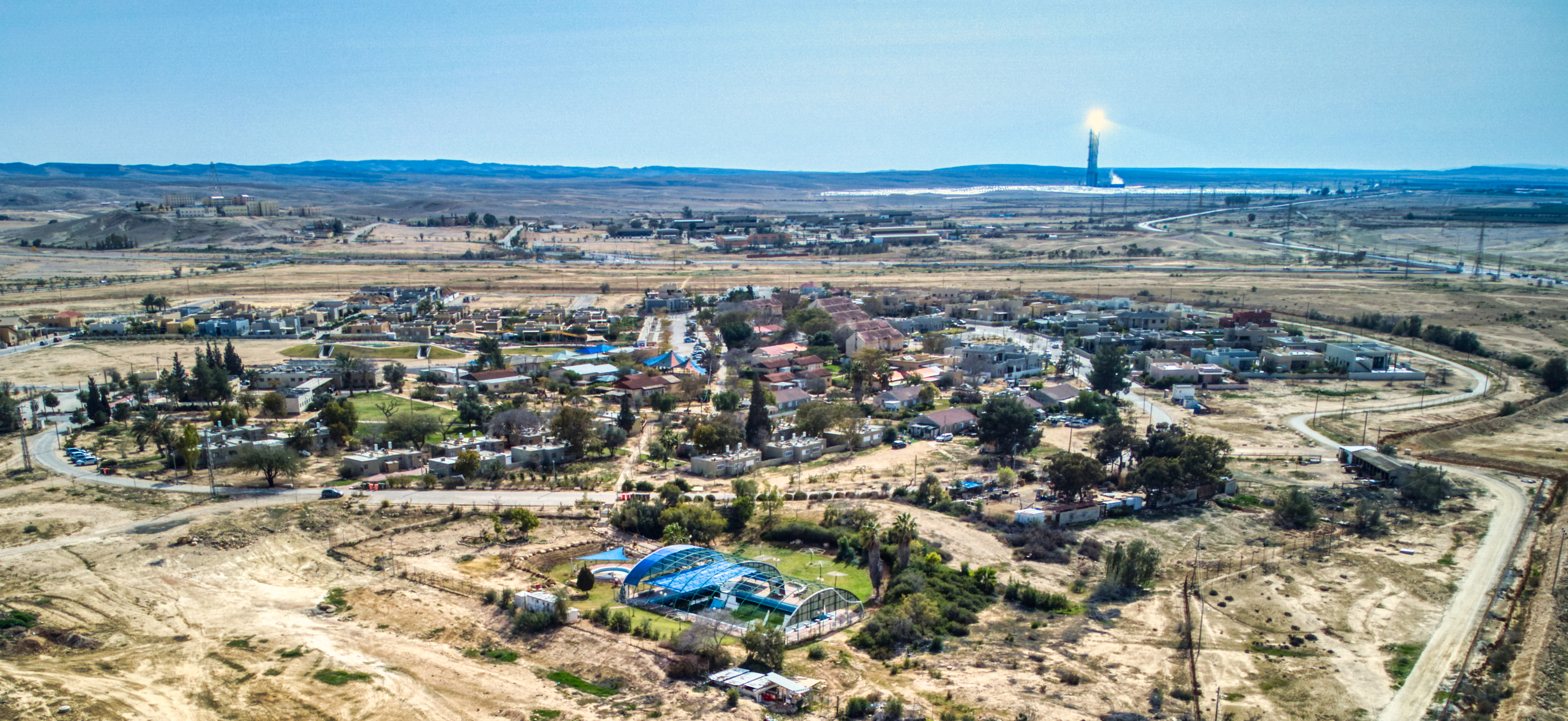
- Tlalim from a bird's eye view

- Location within Northern Negev region of Israel Location within Israel
- Coordinates: 30°59′32″N 34°46′19″E
- Country: Israel
- District: Southern
- Subdistrict: Beersheba
- Council: Ramat HaNegev
- Affiliation: Kibbutz Movement
- Founded: 1980
- Founder: Hebrew Scouts
- Population (2024): 686

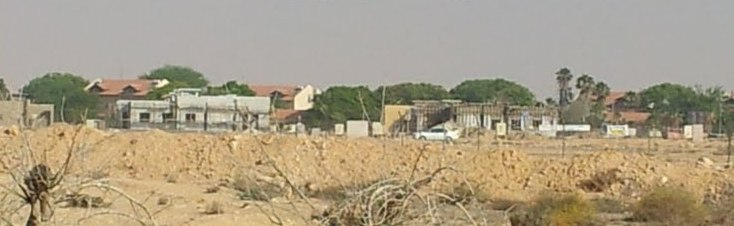

Tlalim (Hebrew: טְלָלִים) is a kibbutz in southern Israel. Located in the Negev desert, it falls under the jurisdiction of Ramat HaNegev Regional Council. In 2024 it had a population of 686.

== Etymology ==
Tlalim is the plural form of the Hebrew word for dew, tal. The kibbutz was named for the large amount of dew which falls in the area each year.

== History ==
Tlalim was founded in 1980 by a gar'in of Hebrew Scouts. It was one of the first kibbutzim to be privatised. In 2021, archaeologists discovered a 2,500 year old burial site near the kibbutz. Many of the buried are women, and the finds hail from many different cultures, including Edom, Moab, Phoenicia and Egypt.

== Economy ==
In addition to agriculture, the kibbutz operates a concrete factory.
