= Kibbutz Movement =

Largest settlement movement for kibbutzim in Israel

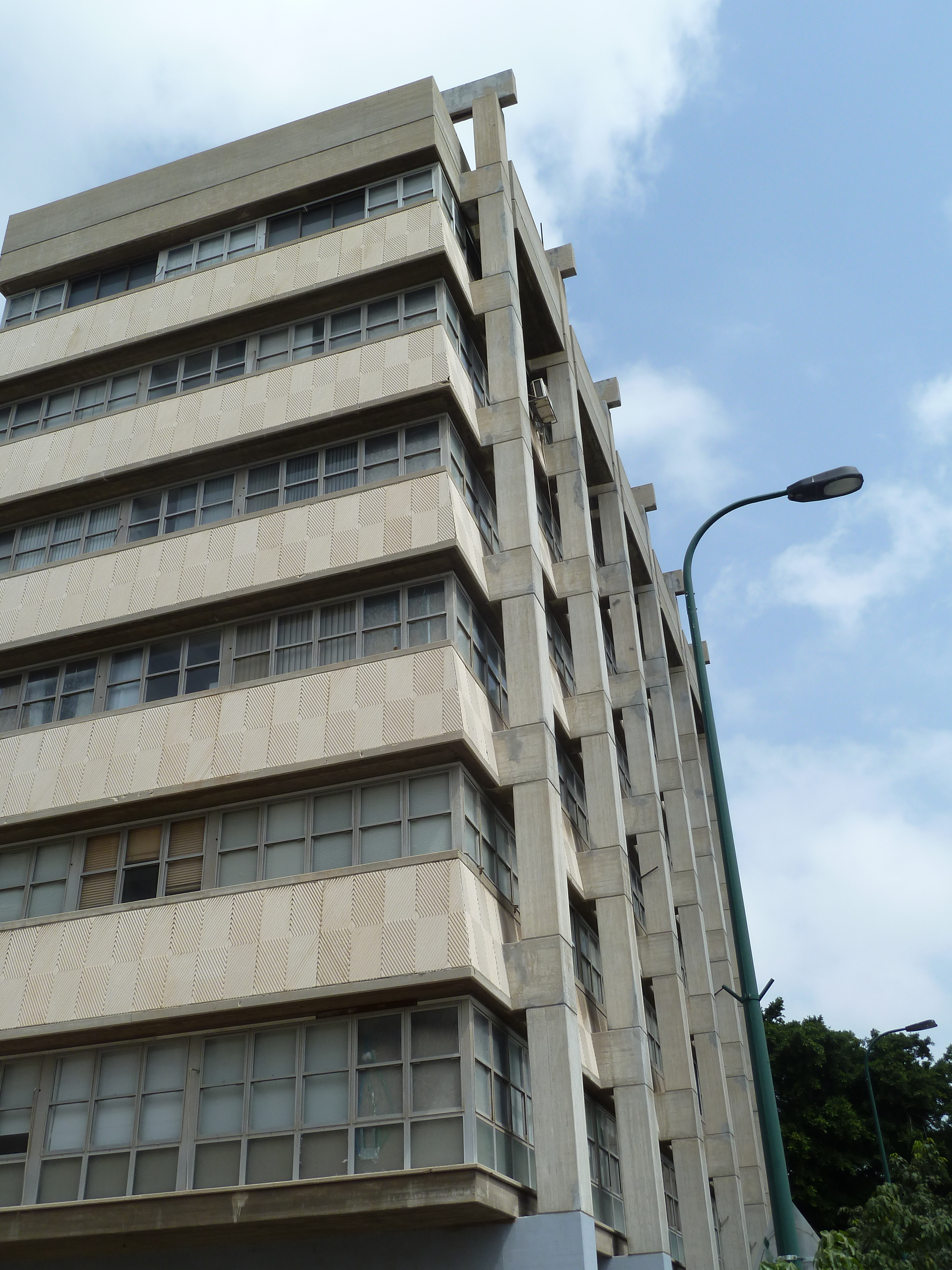
Headquarters of the Kibbutz Movement, Tel Aviv

The Kibbutz Movement (Hebrew: התנועה הקיבוצית, HaTnu'a HaKibbutzit) is the largest settlement movement for kibbutzim in Israel. It was formed in 1999 by a partial merger of the United Kibbutz Movement and Kibbutz Artzi and is made up of approximately 230 kibbutzim. It does not include the Religious Kibbutz Movement with its 16 kibbutzim or the two Poalei Agudat Yisrael-affiliated religious kibbutzim.

== United Kibbutz Movement ==
The United Kibbutz Movement (Hebrew: התנועה הקבוצית המאוחדת, HaTnu'a HaKibbutzit HaMeuhedet), also known by its Hebrew acronym TaKaM (תק"ם), was founded in 1981 and was largely aligned with the Labor Party and its predecessors. It had been formed by a merger itself, when HaKibbutz HaMeuhad and Ihud HaKvutzot VeHaKibbutzim came together. Consequently, their respective youth movements merged into the Habonim Dror youth movement.

In 1999 a third movement, Artzi, joined the United Kibbutz Movement, although it maintains a certain autonomy, as does its Hashomer Hatzair youth movement.

== History ==
=== HaKibbutz HaMeuhad ===
HaKibbutz HaMeuhad (The United Kibbutz) had been formed in 1927 by the union of several kibbutz bodies and was associated with the Poale Zion and later Ahdut HaAvoda parties and was aligned with the Habonim youth movement.

=== Ihud HaKvutzot VeHaKibbutzim ===
Ihud HaKvutzot VeHaKibbutzim (Hebrew: איחוד הקבוצות והקיבוצים, lit. Union of the Kvutzot and the Kibbutzim) had been formed in 1951 by the union of Hever HaKvutzot (חבר הקבוצות, lit. Group of the Kvutzot) and Ihud HaKibbutzim (איחוד הקיבוצים, lit. Union of the Kibbutzim). The movement included kibbutzim which had left HaKibbutz HaMeuhad for ideological reasons and was aligned with the Labour Party and its predecessors, Mapai and the Dror youth movement.

=== Kibbutz Artzi ===
Kibbutz Artzi (Hebrew: הקיבוץ הארצי hakibúts haartsí, lit. Nationwide Kibbutz) was a kibbutz movement associated with the Hashomer Hatzair youth movement, and the Mapam political party. It was founded on 1 April 1927, and had 85 kibbutzim and 28,000 members in 1998.

== See also ==
- Settlement movement (Israel), the wider communal settlement movement within the pre-1967 borders
- List of kibbutzim
