= Nitzana, Israel =

Community settlement in southern Israel

Nitzana: ניצנה (Hebrew)

Hebrew transcription(s)
  - Official: Nizzana
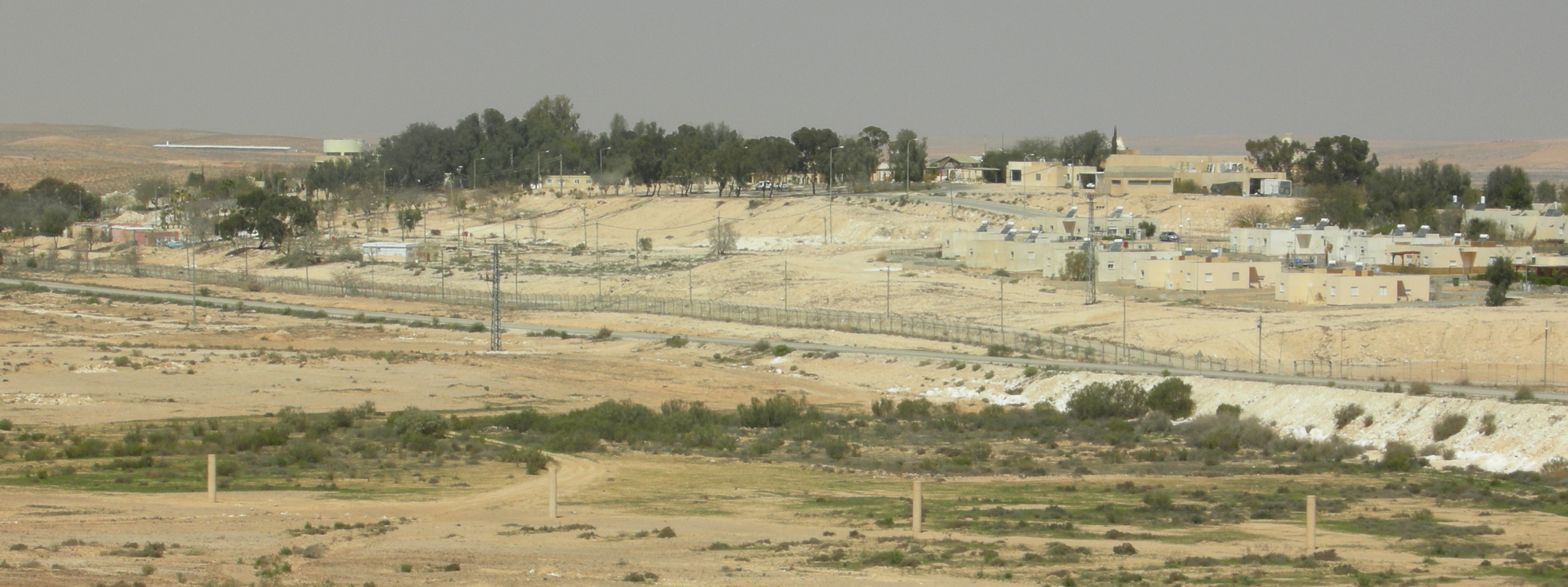
- Nitzana viewed from the south.

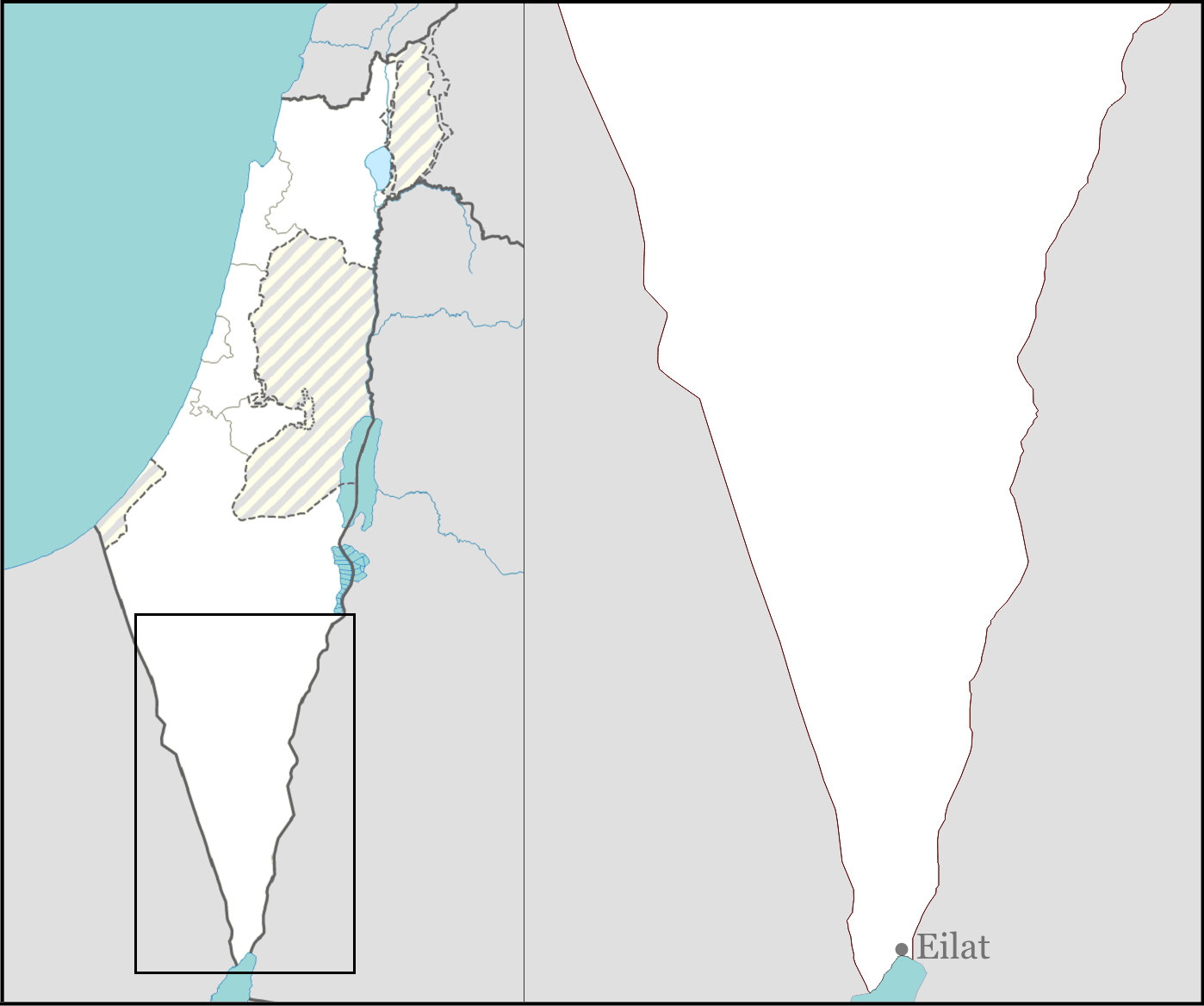
- Location within Southern Negev region of Israel Location within Israel
- Coordinates: 30°53′10″N 34°25′21″E
- Country: Israel
- District: Southern
- Subdistrict: Beersheba
- Council: Ramat HaNegev
- Founded: 1987
- Population (2024): 312

Nitzana (Hebrew: נִצָּנָה, ניצנה) is an educational youth village and institutional settlement in southern Israel. Located in the western Negev desert, adjacent to the Egyptian border, it falls under the jurisdiction of Ramat HaNegev Regional Council. In 2024 it had a population of 312.

== Ancient Nitzana ==
Ancient Nessana was founded by the Nabataeans in the 3rd century BCE. There are traces of a large first century BCE building with a monumental staircase. The settlement was a trading post on the Aila to Gaza route. In the early 2nd century CE Roman emperor Hadrian diverted this trade from Aila to Damascus. Despite this loss, Nessana grew under Byzantine rule. In the late 3rd century the fort was enlarged with stables for horses and camels. In the 4th century a church was built attached to the north end of the fort. It was dedicated to SS Sergius and Baccus. In the 7th century a second church, dedicated to the Virgin Mary, was built 60m south east of the fort.

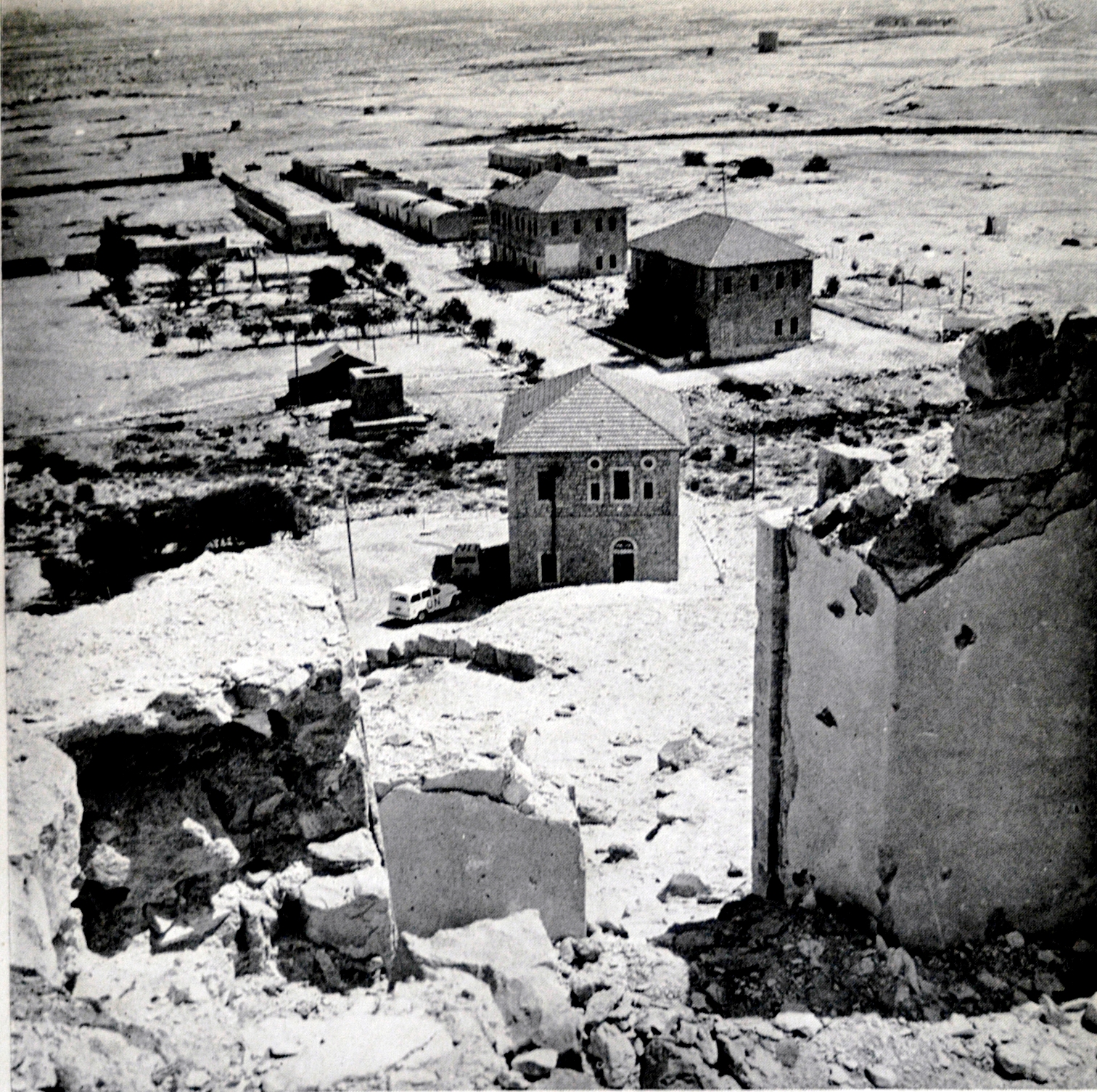
Al Auja before 1956

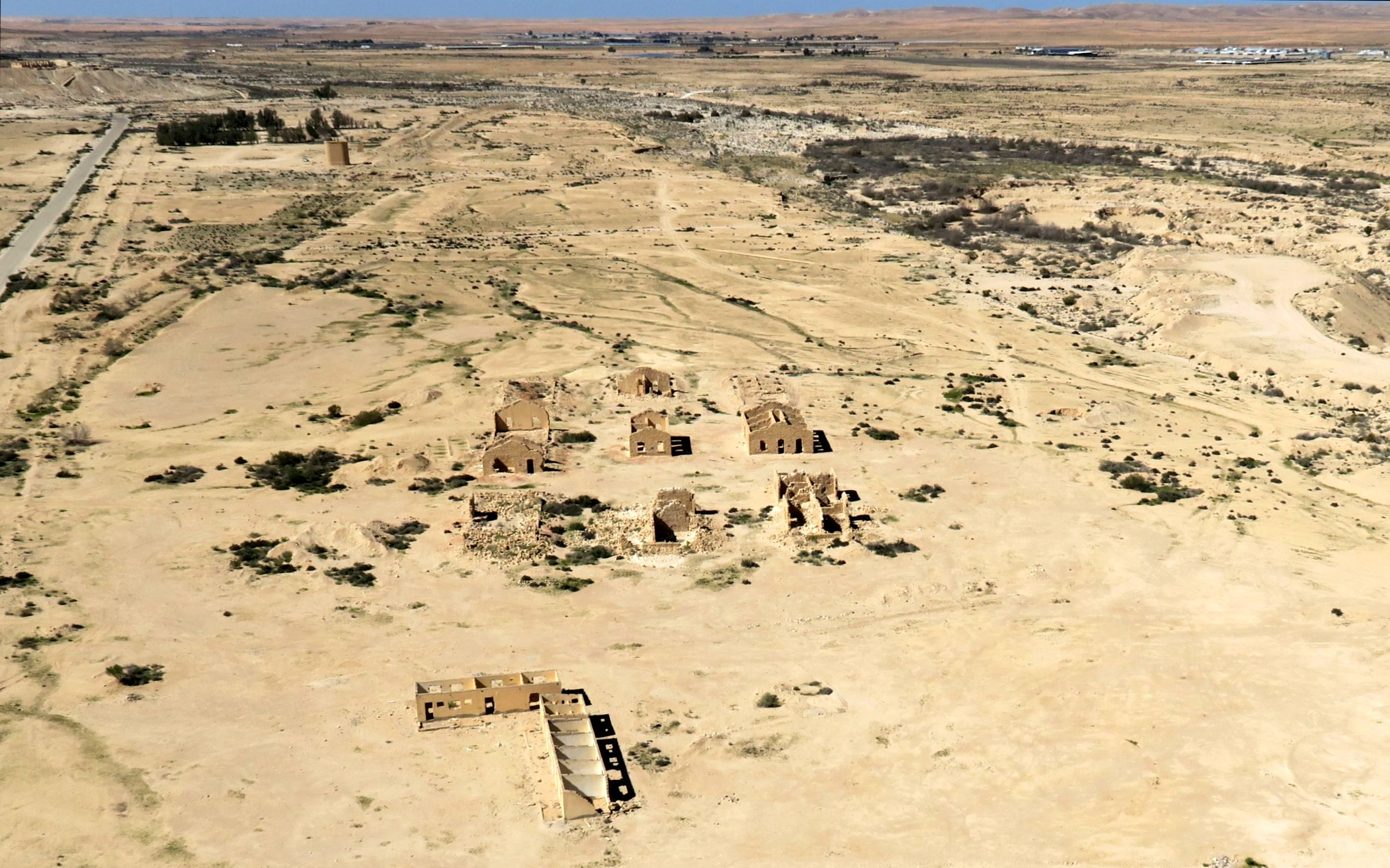
Remnants of the Turkish railway station. At the far left: the water stop.

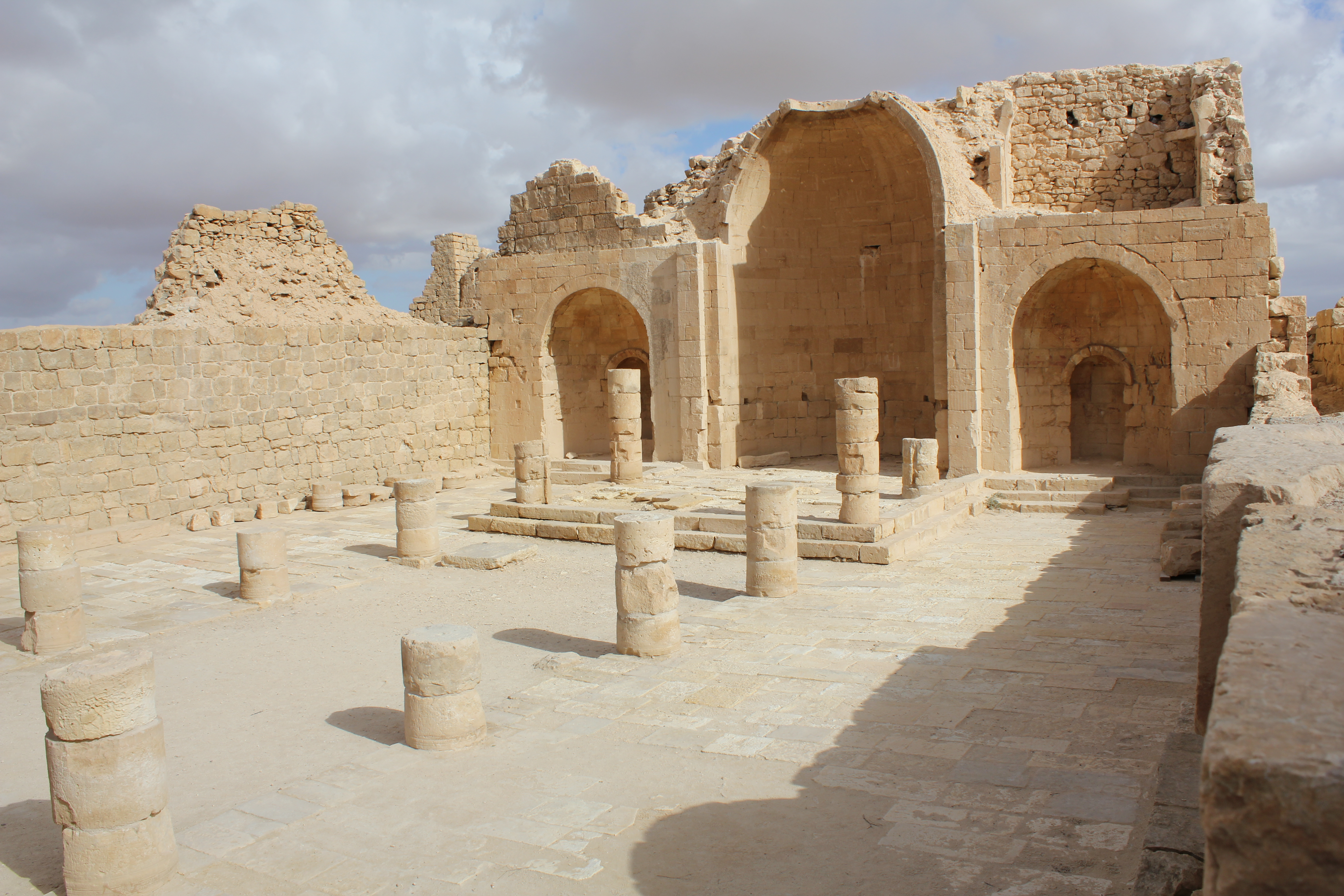
Archaeological site of a Byzantine Monastery, St. Catherine in Nitzana, Israel.

The tax register for 587–9 CE indicates that the town had 1,500 inhabitants, with 116 houses. This was a time of prosperity with the route from Gaza to Aila reopened and pilgrim traffic to Saint Catherine's Monastery. A find of late Byzantine papyri has given much detail of the life of the town. However, following the arrival of Islam the town went into a slow decline and by the 8th century it had ceased to exist.

Ottoman Railway Ruins in Nitzana

The Ottoman Empire and the British fought each other in the Sinai and Gaza regions of modern-day Egypt and Israel in 1917 during World War I. An Ottoman railway line that connected Be'er Sheva and Auja al Hafir was at the heart of the conflict.

The railway was a strategically crucial piece of infrastructure that would greatly boost the Ottomans' military capabilities in the area as it was being expanded south and west from Auja al Hafir to the Suez Canal. The British and her allies therefore set their sights on it.

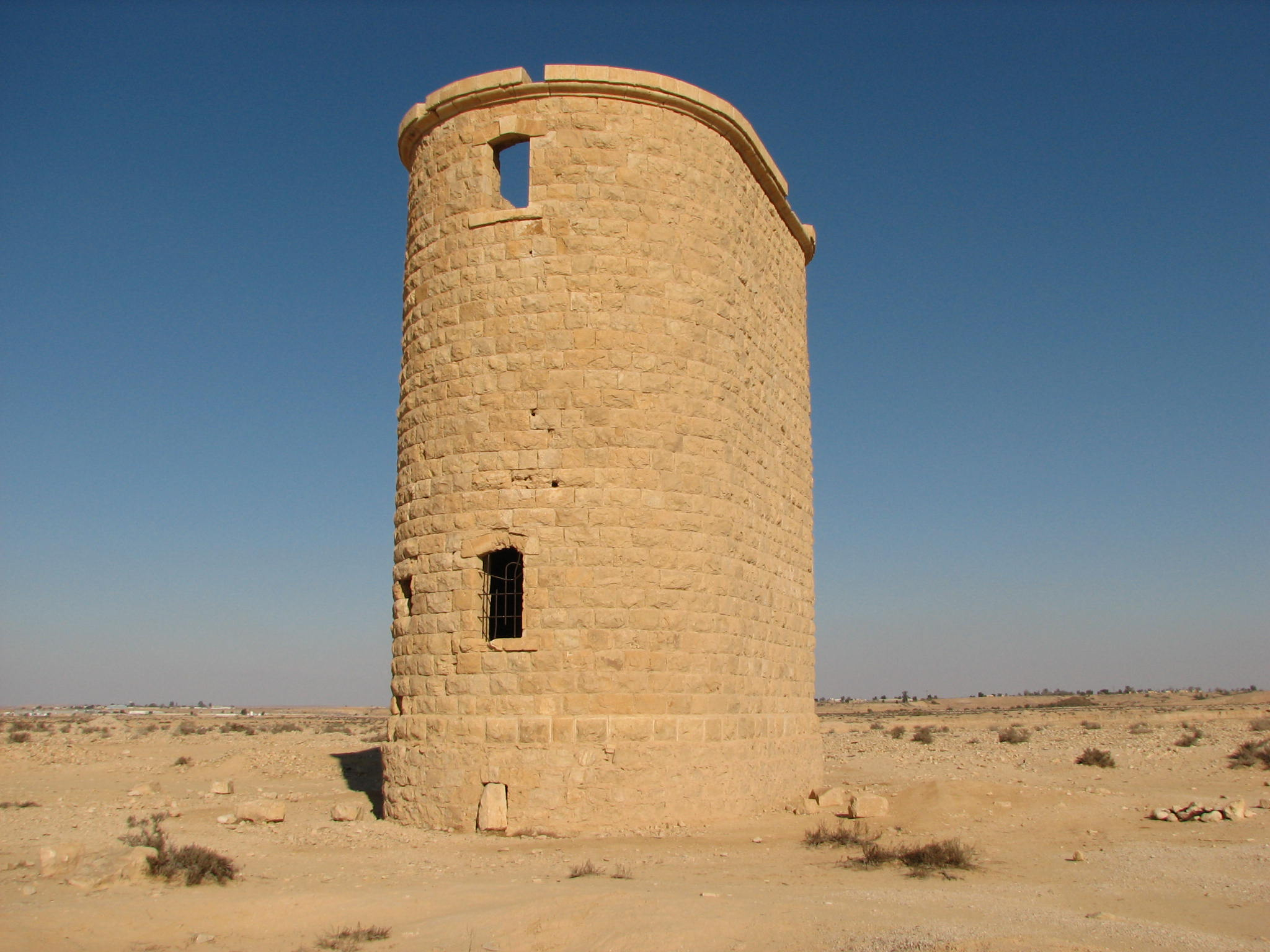
Archaeological remains of the Ottoman Railway Water Tower at Nitzana National Park.

== Modern village ==
The modern village was founded in 1987 by Aryeh Eliav, a former member of the Knesset for several left-wing parties, and was named after the Nabatean city. It also gives its name to the Nitzana Border Crossing, formerly Auja al-Hafir. It was the site of Operation Volcano in 1955, an Israeli raid against Egyptian positions. On 18 June 2012 an Israeli was killed in a terrorist attack near the village.

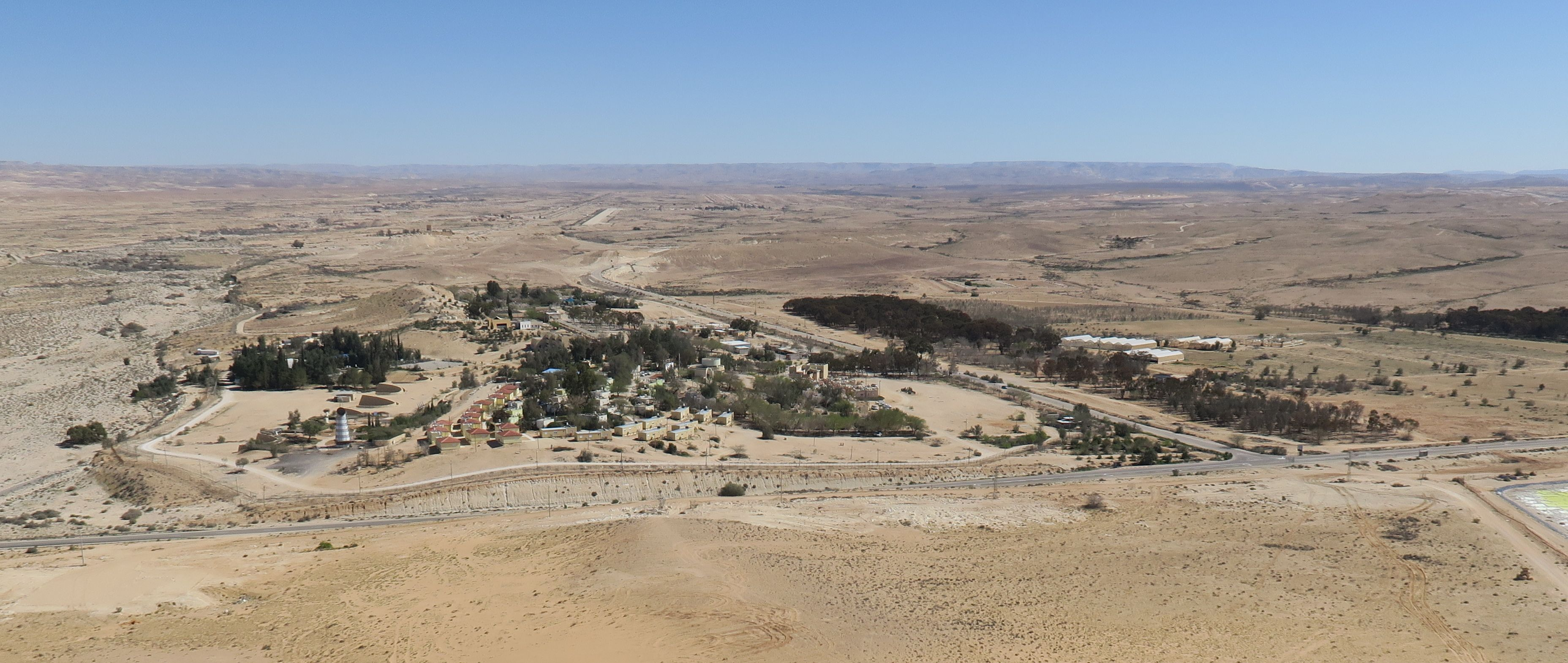
Nitzana - aerial view

== See also ==
- Nitzanei Sinai, a nearby community settlement.
