= Route 171 (Israel) =

Road in Israel

Highway 171
- כביש 171
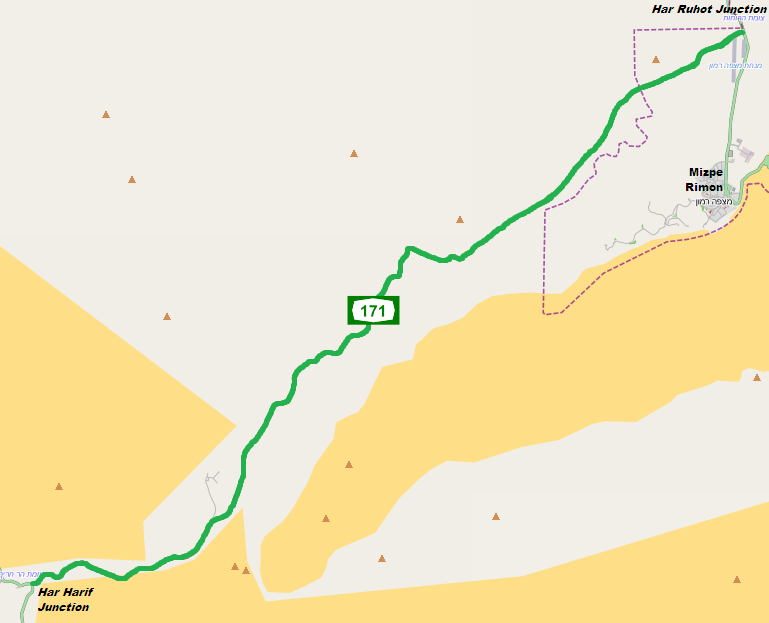

Route information
- Length: 33 km (21 mi)

Major junctions
- West end: Har Harif Junction
- East end: HaRuhot Junction

Location
- Country: Israel
- Major cities: Mitzpe Ramon

Highway system
- Roads in Israel; Highways
← Route 109	→ Route 200

Route 171 is a regional east-west road in southern Israel. It is the only east-west road in the Negev Mountains. It is 33 km long. It goes from Mount Harif (Hebrew: הר חריף) junction on Highway 10 adjacent to Israel's border with Egypt to HaRuhot junction with Highway 40 about 5 km north of Mitzpe Ramon. The road passes mostly along the northern edge of Makhtesh Ramon and along the flowing path of Nahal Nitzana. In its eastern portion, it crosses HaRuhot Plain and passes by the Mitzpe Ramon Airport.

== Junctions (West to East) ==
District	Location	km	mi	Name	Destinations	Notes
Southern	Har Harif	0	0.0	צומת הר חריף (Mount Harif Junction)	Highway 10	
Southern	North of Mitzpe Ramon	33	21	צומת הרוחות (HaRuhot Junction)	Highway 40	
1.000 mi = 1.609 km; 1.000 km = 0.621 mi

About 5 km northeast of Har Harif junction, 950 meters above mean sea level, are the Lotz Cisterns. This is a group of 17 water cisterns spread over an area of 2 square km, that were dug during the reign of Solomon in the 10th century BCE. 15 of the water pits are still filled with water in the winter rainy season.

== See also ==
- List of highways in Israel
