= 2011 southern Israel cross-border attacks =

Series of cross-border attacks

- Part of the Sinai insurgency and the Gaza–Israel conflict
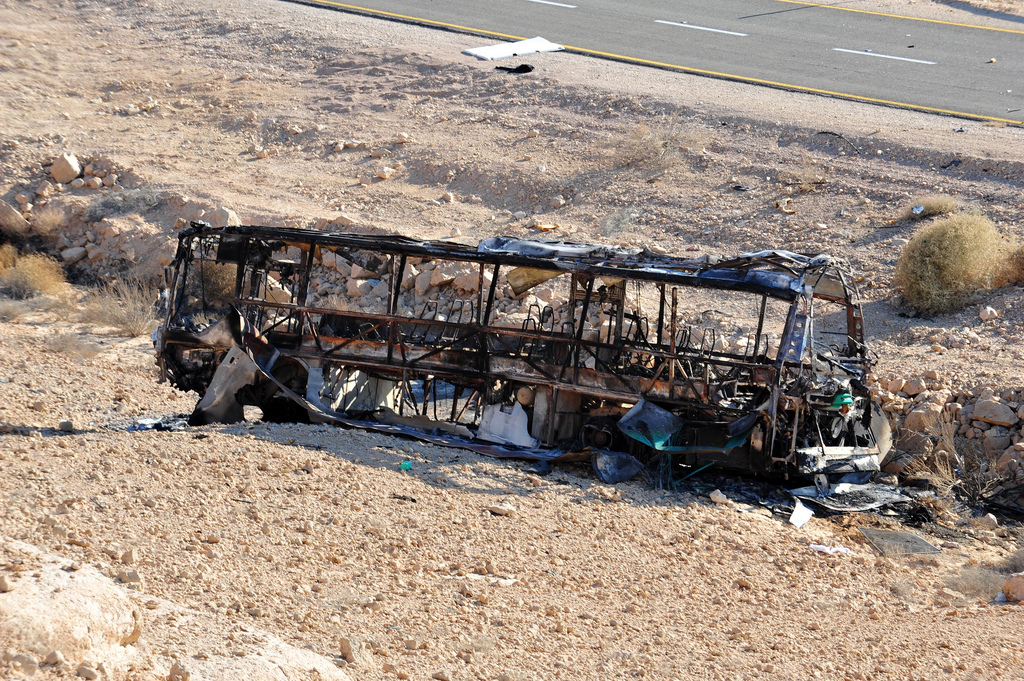

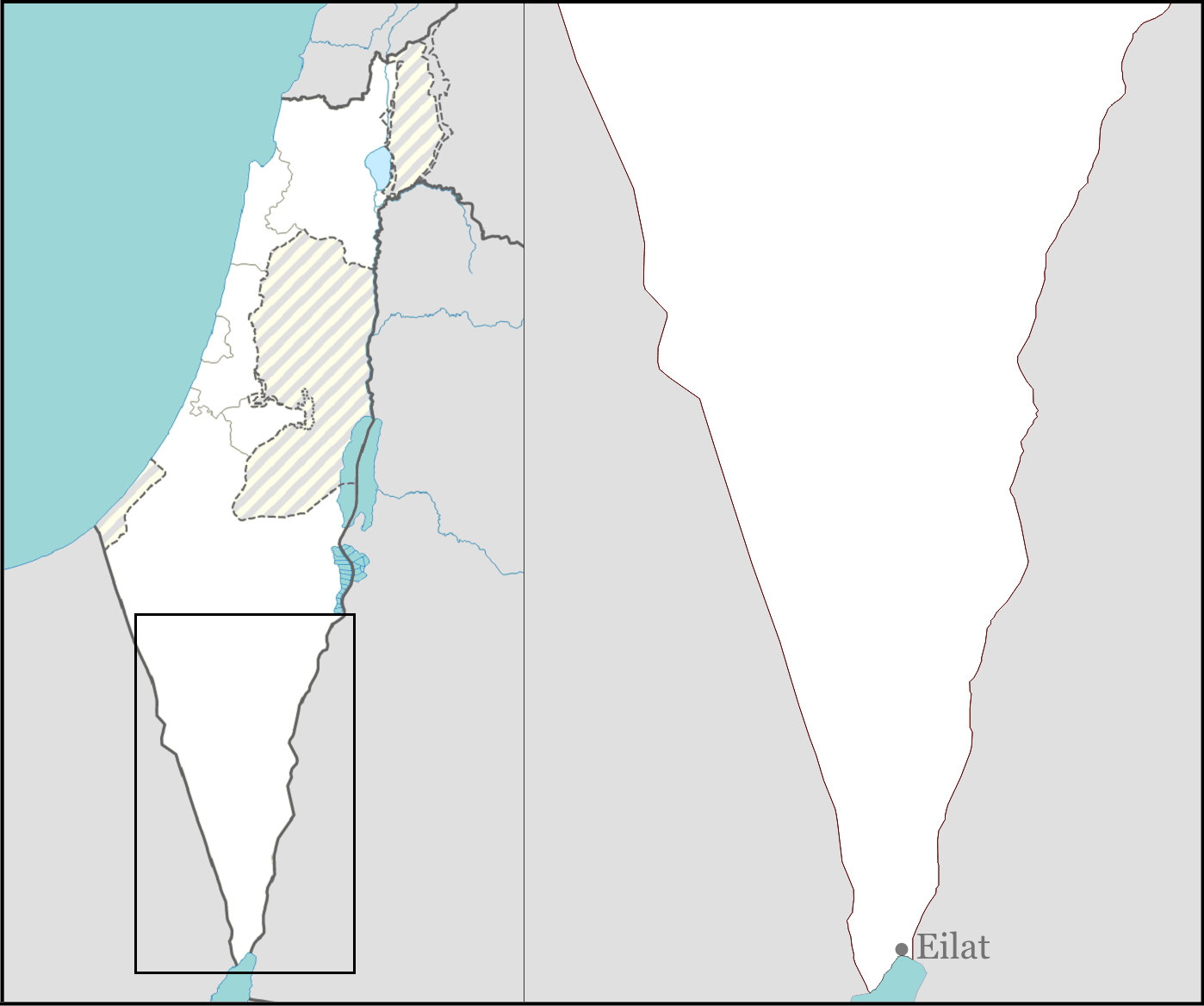
- Site of the attacks
- Location: 29°35′9″N 34°52′53″E; Near the Ein Netafim spring, on Highway 12, Southern Israel
- Date: August 18, 2011; 15 years ago
- Attack type: Spree killing, shooting attack, bombings, rocket attack, suicide bombing, firefight
- Weapons: AK-47 rifles, RPGs, anti-tank missile, roadside bomb
- Deaths: 6 Israeli civilians, 1 Israeli soldier, 1 Israeli Yamam policeman, 5 Egyptian soldiers, 10 attackers
- Injuries: 40 Israelis
- Perpetrators: Israel has stated that the attacks were orchestrated by the Gaza based Popular Resistance Committees, who deny involvement. Egyptian sources report that three of the attackers were Sinai-based Egyptians.
- No. of participants: Presumably 12 assailants

On August 18, 2011, a series of cross-border attacks with parallel attacks and mutual cover was carried out in southern Israel on Highway 12 near the Egyptian border by a squad of presumably twelve militants in four groups. The attacks occurred after Israel's interior security service Shin Bet had warned of an attack by militants in the region and Israeli troops had been stationed in the area. The militants first opened fire at an Egged No. 392 bus as it was traveling on Highway 12 in the Negev near Eilat. Several minutes later, a bomb was detonated next to an Israeli army patrol along Israel's border with Egypt. In a third attack, an anti-tank missile hit a private vehicle, killing four civilians. Eight Israelis – six civilians, one Yamam special unit police sniper and one Golani Brigade soldier—were killed in the multiple-stage attack. The Israel Defense Forces reported eight attackers killed, and Egyptian security forces reported killing another two.

Five Egyptian soldiers were also killed. According to Egypt, they were killed by Israeli security forces chasing militants across the Egyptian border, while an Israeli military officer initially said they were killed by a suicide bomber who had fled across the border into Egypt. The five deaths triggered a diplomatic row between Egypt and Israel and led to mass protests outside the Israeli embassy in Cairo. According to media reports, Egypt threatened to withdraw its ambassador to Israel, but Egypt's foreign minister later denied this. Israel expressed regret over the deaths, and sent a letter of apology to Egypt. The IDF was ordered to conduct a military probe of the incident, and on August 25, 2011, Israel agreed to a joint investigation with Egypt of the events.

The identity of the attackers, three of whom were reportedly Egyptian, is not widely agreed upon, and so far no group took responsibility for the attacks. The Israeli government accused the Palestinian Popular Resistance Committees (PRC), a Gaza-based coalition of Palestinian militant groups, of orchestrating the attacks, but the PRC denied involvement. However, Israel attacked seven targets in the Gaza Strip immediately after the terror attacks in the Negev, killing five members of the PRC, including its leader.

On August 21, 2011, an informal ceasefire was called by Israel and Hamas after days of escalating violence in which fifteen Palestinians were killed and many were wounded. More than 100 rockets and mortar shells were fired from Gaza into Israel, killing one Israeli and wounding more than a dozen. The ceasefire was broken almost immediately by rocket fire from Gaza on southern Israel, followed by retaliatory Israeli airstrikes, killing at least seven Palestinians, among them two leaders of the Islamic Jihad. On August 26, 2011, Gaza militants called a second truce. On March 9, 2012, Israel Air Force, in a strike on Palestinian targets in Gaza, killed the secretary-general of the Popular Resistance Committees, Zuhir al-Qaisi, whom Israel considers as "one of the masterminds" of the August 18, 2011 attacks.

== Background ==
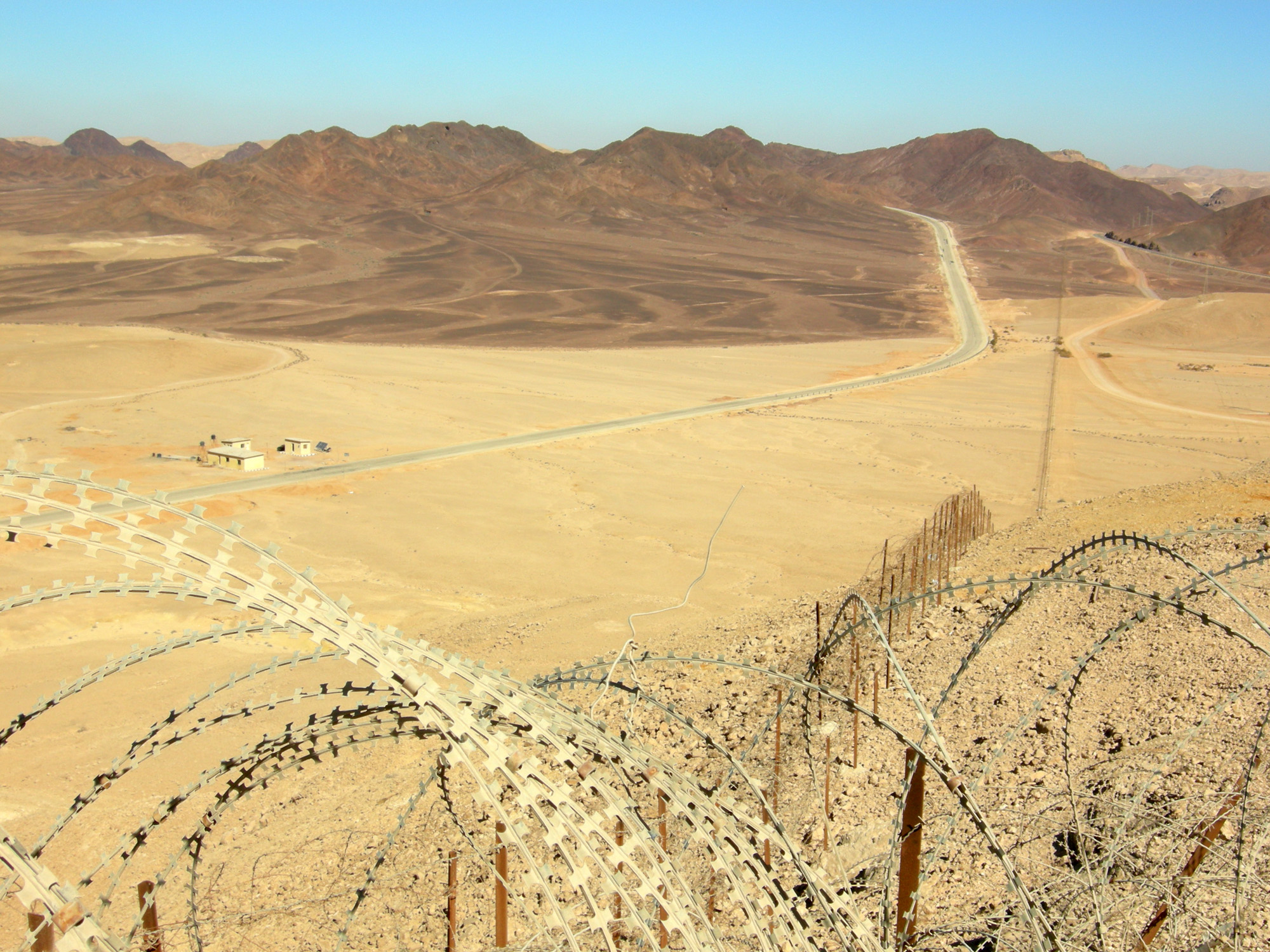
Egypt–Israel border north of Eilat near where the attacks took place. Egypt is on the left, Israel on the right.

The southern part of Israeli Highway 12 runs adjacent to Israel's border with Egypt. It was the scene of previous shooting attacks in the 1990s. In the late 2000s, the Israeli government decided to build the Israel–Egypt barrier, although by 2011 only 10% of it had been completed, none close to the site of the attack.

Following the 2011 Egyptian revolution, militant organizations increased their activity in the Sinai Peninsula and Al-Qaeda militants groups were established, after Egyptian police had all but completely withdrawn from the northern Sinai, dominated by Bedouin tribes. During the months preceding the cross-border attacks, Egypt reinforced its forces with about 1,000 additional soldiers in the Sinai Peninsula, with the consent of Israel, after a series of five bombings had disrupted the flow of natural gas to Israel.

On July 30, militants staged an attack on an Egyptian police station in El-Arish, killing six.

On August 2, a group claiming to be the Sinai wing of Al Qaeda declared its intention to create an Islamic caliphate in the Sinai.

On August 14, 2011, Egyptian forces swept the Sinai Peninsula in search of terror cells. Jordanian intelligence informed the Israelis that they had information about an impending terror attack in the south of Israel. Two days prior to the attack, the Egyptian army captured four Islamist insurgents as they prepared to blow up a gas pipeline in the northern part of the Sinai Peninsula.

Israeli interior security service Shin Bet had warned of terrorist attacks being planned in the region in an area 80 kilometers long, presuming that they would take place at night. The warnings led to a massive deployment of IDF troops, and the closing of Highway 12, which was reopened only on the day of the attack at the order of head of IDF's southern command Tal Russo.

== August 18 cross-border attacks and immediate Israeli response ==
The original attacks occurred in three coordinated stages. They were carried out by 12 militants in four groups dispersed over an area 12 kilometers long. At least some of the attackers wore brown uniforms, similar to those used by the Egyptian Army. Israeli military and police forces, in cooperation with Shin Bet, began pursuing the perpetrators immediately after the attacks commenced and locked down the area.

The attacks commenced around 12:00 pm (UTC+2) near the Ein Netafim spring, on Highway 12 from Mitzpe Ramon to Eilat, when three militants spread out about 200 meters from one another, armed with suicide bomb vests, grenades, RPGs, and machine guns opened fire on an Egged passenger bus on line 392, carrying mostly soldiers but also some civilians. Seven passengers were wounded, most of them soldiers. According to eyewitnesses, a white car was following the bus, and a group of people dressed in military uniforms got out and opened fire. The bus driver, Benny Belevsky, did not stop the bus and sped away, getting to an IDF post near the Netafim Border Crossing.

The militants, dressed in brown uniforms resembling those of the Egyptian Army, then began attacking passing vehicles, waving white handkerchiefs to fool motorists. One of the militants attacked a bus that drove by and detonated the suicide bomb belt he was wearing, killing himself and the bus driver, who had stopped the empty bus. Another militant opened fire at a passing car and killed the female driver. The same militant then fired an RPG at an Israeli Air Force helicopter, but missed. An IDF jeep from the Golani Brigade then arrived at the scene and ran over the militant, killing him. Another Golani Brigade jeep arrived, and ran over a roadside bomb. As the soldiers exited the damaged vehicle, the surviving militant opened fire at them. Soldiers and Yamam special police officers then located the militant and killed him in a gunbattle. Two other militants then opened fire at them from Egyptian territory. Israeli forces briefly crossed the border and killed both of the militants. One Israeli soldier was killed by friendly fire during the engagement and several soldiers were wounded. The Egyptian Army informed the IDF that its soldiers killed two more militants in the Sinai.

In the third attack, which occurred around 12:35, mortar shells were fired at soldiers carrying out routine maintenance work at the security fence constructed along the border between Israel and Egypt. No one was hurt in the attack.

Around 13:30, not far from the first shooting incident, militants opened fire, including with an anti-tank missile, at a bus and private car on route 90, a desert road near the border with Jordan. According to medics, five people were killed in the attacks. Seven people were wounded when another private vehicle was hit by an anti-tank missile. Eyewitnesses suggested that some of the attackers may have been wearing Egyptian Army uniforms. Two IAF helicopters were called to the scene in order to evacuate those wounded.

Around 18:30, an Israeli patrol was fired on from the Egyptian border as it searched for militants. Israeli troops returned fire, and the shooting lasted for about an hour. A sniper from the Yamam special police unit was critically wounded and later died. News of the firefight interrupted a briefing by the Israeli Defense Minister Ehud Barak and Chief of Staff Benny Gantz.

According to an Egyptian probe, Israeli troops entered the Sinai Peninsula chasing after the terrorists, exchanging fire with Egyptian police, and an Israeli helicopter fired two rockets at the terrorists and machine guns at Egyptian security personnel, killing an Egyptian officer and two policemen. In a later incident, first reported as a suicide bomb attack, another two Egyptian soldiers were killed, presumably also by Israeli forces. Some Israeli sources claimed that an IDF investigation said that the IDF's attack helicopters avoided hitting the Egyptian military and that it remains unclear who fired the deadly shots.

The five deaths triggered a diplomatic row between the two countries and lead to mass protests in Cairo outside the Israeli embassy.

Following the attack, all roads to and from Eilat were sealed off and operations at Ovda Airport were suspended. Roadblocks were set up at the entrance to the city of Eilat, and the area was locked down. Magen David Adom (Israel's national emergency medical, disaster, ambulance and blood bank service) raised its alert level and began preparing teams of paramedics and medical equipment. The Israeli Air Force sent in Eilat police deployed a large number of security forces and a police war room was opened at the Yoseftal Medical Center. Seven of the 29 injured people who were brought to the Yoseftal Medical Center were later transferred to Soroka Medical Center in Beersheba. The police asked the public to expect roadblocks at the entrance to Eilat amidst a heavy police presence in the city; however later in the day they added that no security incidents were under way in either Eilat or Beersheba despite calling for public vigilance and for the public-at-large to contact police in case of any suspicious individuals or items.

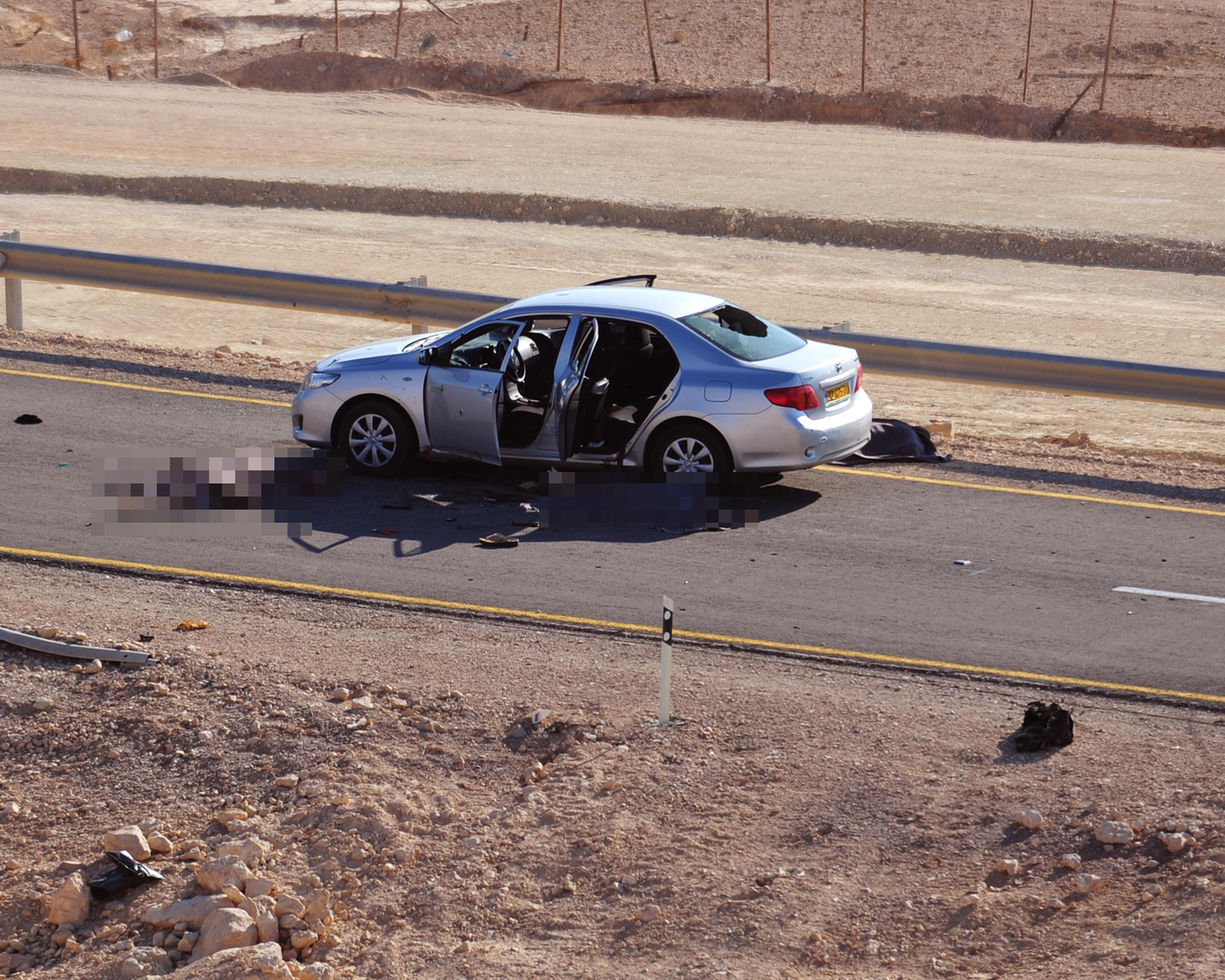
The private car in which four civilians were killed by militants

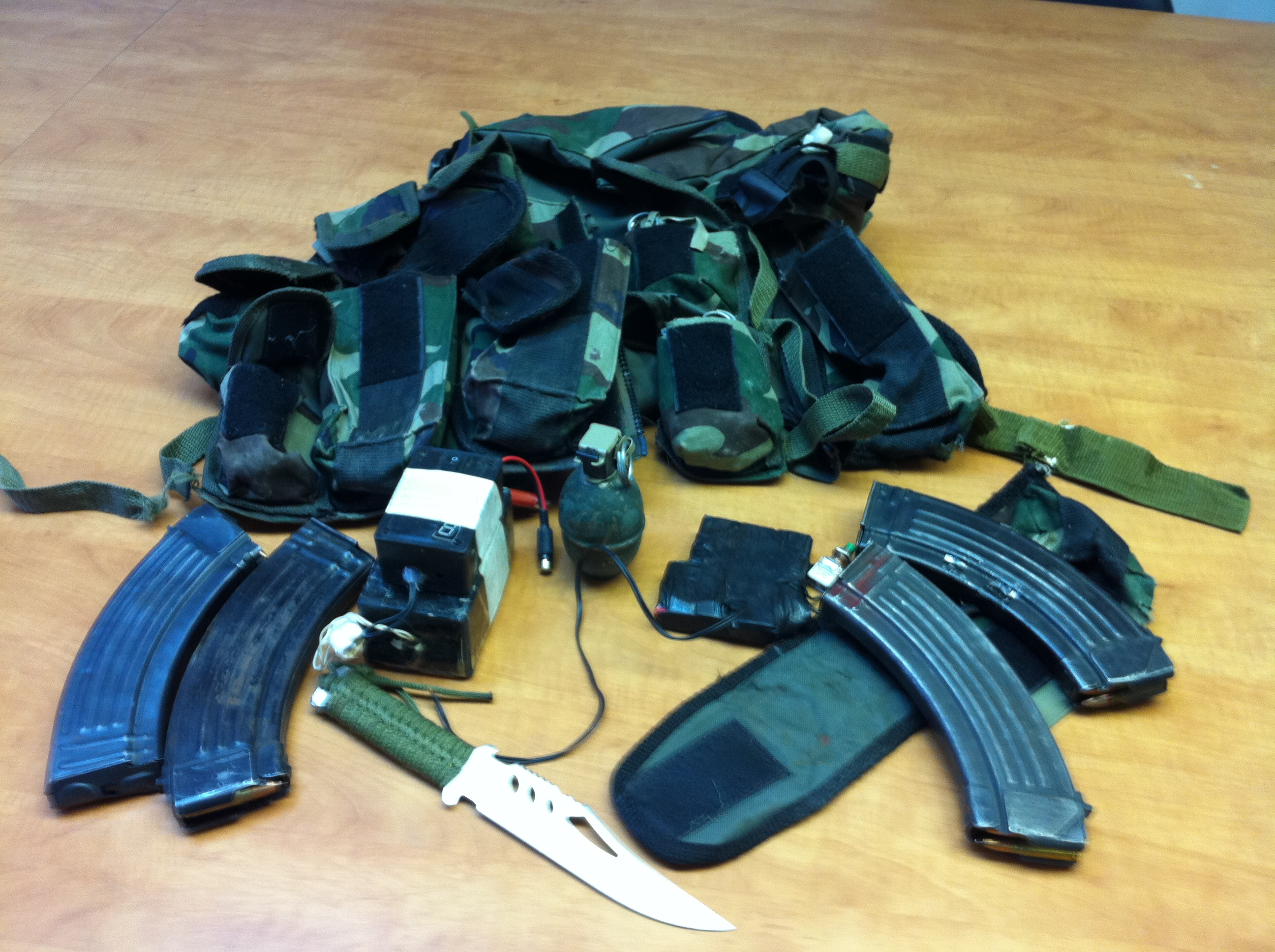
Captured weapons

=== Fatalities ===
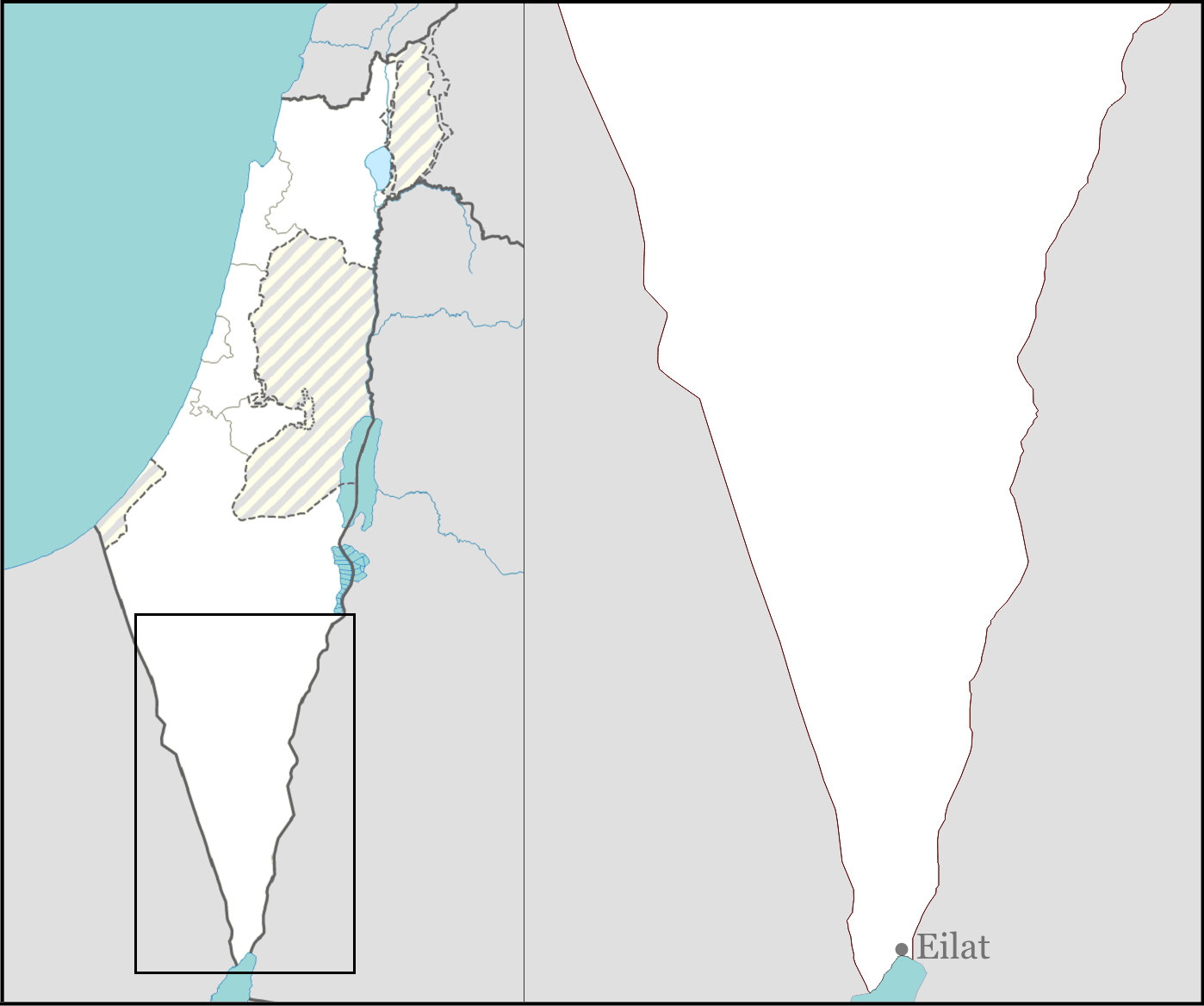
Location of the attacks

Israeli civilians

- Yitzhak Sela, 56, a bus driver from Beersheba
- Yosef Levi, 57 of Holon
- Flora Gez, 52, a kindergarten teacher from Kfar Saba,
- Moshe Gez, 53, of Kfar Saba, Flora Gez's husband
- Dov Karlinski, 58, of Kfar Saba, Shula Karlinski's husband
- Shula Karlinski, 54, a kindergarten teacher's assistant from Kfar Saba,

Two of the victims, Flora Gez and Shula Karlinski, were sisters.

Israeli security forces

- Staff-Sergeant Moshe Naftali, 22, of Ofra
- Chief Warrant Officer Pascal Avrahami, 49, of Jerusalem

Egyptian soldiers

- Officer Osama Galal Emam, 22, of Qalyubia, presumably killed by Israeli forces.
- Officer Taha Mohamed Ibrahim, 22, of Helwan, presumably killed by Israeli forces.
- Ahmed Galal Mohamed, of Asyut, presumably killed by Israeli forces.
- Ahmed Mohamed Abu Esa, presumably killed by Israeli forces.
- Emad Abdel Malak, presumably killed by Israeli forces.

Attackers

- Eight militants killed by Israeli forces.
- Two militants killed by Egyptian forces.
- One suicide bomber killed by his own device.

=== Injuries ===
- 40 people in total (on both sides)

Egyptian soldiers

- Several soldiers wounded by a suicide bomber.

=== Responsibility ===
According to SITE a group calling itself Ansar Bait al-Maqdis claimed responsibility for the attack. Nevertheless, Israel stated that it possesses evidence that indicate that the attacks were orchestrated by the Popular Resistance Committees (PRC) in Gaza.

The (PRC) denied any involvement in the attack, though they praised it. According to PRC spokesman, "The occupation wants to pin this operation on us in order to escape its own internal problems". According to Haaretz, there is doubt in Gaza, that members of the Popular Resistance Committees were behind the attack. The Egyptian daily Al-Masry Al-Youm reported that Egyptian security forces identified three of those responsible for the attack as Egyptians.

Hamas, which governs Gaza, also denied involvement. Sky News quoted Hamas spokesman Taher al-Nunu as saying: "The Palestinian government denies the accusations made by Barak about the operation in Eilat and affirms that there is no relation between the Gaza Strip and what happened near Eilat." Hamas did, however, "praise" the attack.

The Washington Times reported that US intelligence agencies linked Al-Qaeda to the attack, claiming that either the PRC or the Gaza-based Jaish al Islam carried out the attacks.

== Subsequent events ==
=== Israeli response in the Gaza Strip ===
August 2011 Gaza Strip air raids
- Part of the Israeli–Palestinian conflict
Date	August 18–19
Location	Southern Gaza Strip
Result	Israeli military victory

Belligerents
Israel (IDF, ISA)	Hamas; Popular Resistance Committees

Commanders and leaders
Benny Gantz (Cos); Ido Nehoshtan (Air Force); Yoram Cohen (Shin Bet)	Ismail Haniyah; Kamal Al-Nairab †; Immad Hammad †

Casualties and losses
None	14 Palestinians killed including at least 6 senior PRC militants; "scores" injured

At 18:00, the Israeli Air Force, working with Shin Bet, bombed a building used by Popular Resistance Committees' members in Rafah. Five PRC members were killed. Among the dead was the PRC's commander Kamal al-Nairab and military chief Immad Hammad, who was suspected by Shin Bet of having planned the attacks. Of the remaining three, two were top members. The two-year-old son of one of the militants, who was in the building when it was attacked, was also killed. The airstrike occurred in the southern Gaza Strip, close to the Egyptian border. The PRC responded to the attack in saying that it vows "double" revenge. Later, the Israeli Air Force launched a wave of attacks against targets in Gaza. A home near the former Palestinian intelligence headquarters was hit, reportedly killing one and wounding seventeen, and starting a large fire in the area. Israeli aircraft fired three missiles at a building used by Hamas security forces, and bombed a Hamas outpost in Khan Yunis. A missile was also fired at an open area in the southern Gaza Strip. Several targets were bombed in the northern Gaza Strip, including a building used by the Izz ad-Din al-Qassam Brigades. Several targets were hit around the Philadelphi Route, believed to have been smuggling tunnels. Numerous rocket-launching cells were attacked during the airstrikes. Three Palestinian militants were killed as they participated in the firing of rockets, and senior PRC member Samed Abdul Mu'ty Abed was killed while riding a motorcycle in northern Gaza. Another man was injured in the attack that killed Abed.

The Israeli Air Force bombed two tunnels and one warehouse used for manufacturing weapons in southern Gaza and one site used for militant activities. The tunnels had been used to allow assailants to infiltrate Israel and carry out attacks according to a statement released by the IDF Spokesperson's Unit. The IAF identified direct hits, and all aircraft returned to Israel safely. An airstrike in central Gaza targeting a car killed a Palestinian militant, his five-year-old son, and his brother.

On March 9, 2012, Israel Air Force, in a strike on Palestinian targets in Gaza, killed Zuhir al-Qaisi, the secretary-general of the Popular Resistance Committees, whom Israel considers as "one of the masterminds" of the August 18, 2011 attacks, and his collaborator, Mahmoud Hanani.

=== Palestinian militant response to Israeli air strikes ===
After the Israeli Air Force attacked targets in the Gaza Strip, at least 10 rockets were fired into southern Israel, hitting the cities of Ashkelon and Beersheba, causing no injuries. Two additional rockets landed in a courtyard of a Yeshiva in Ashdod, wounding 10 people and lightly damaging the buildings. The Abdullah Azzam Shaheed Brigade, a radical Islamic group affiliated with Al Qaeda, claimed responsibility for the attack.

August 21st rocket attacks
- Part of Israeli–Palestinian conflict
- Location: Beersheba, Ashdod, Ofakim
- Date: August 2011
- Attack type: rocket attack
- Deaths: 1 Israeli civilian killed
- Injuries: 5 Israeli civilians and 3 Palestinian workers
- Perpetrators: PRC, Hamas

Over 80 rockets launched from Gaza hit cities in Israel, killing one Israeli and wounding over a dozen. Seven rockets were fired almost simultaneously at Beersheba. The Iron Dome rocket defense system intercepted five of them, but one hit a residential area and killed Israeli Yossi Shushan. The Lachish subdistrict was hit by 28 rockets and the Negev subdistrict was hit by nine rockets. Four Israelis from the Bnei Shimon Regional Council were injured while running for shelter in Beersheba. Three Palestinians working in Israel were injured by Grad rockets after they exploded in a field in southern Ashdod. Vehicles and homes were damaged by rockets in Israeli cities near Gaza.

A Grad rocket exploded near the coastal city of Ashkelon in the night, though no injuries or damage were reported. It was unknown whether the rocket was intercepted by the Iron Dome, though it was confirmed that a second rocket was intercepted. On August 21, an additional 12 rockets were fired at Israel. Three were intercepted by the Iron Dome in Ashkelon. One of the rockets hit an empty high school building in Beersheba. No one was in the school because "the city had canceled educational activities in light of the missile attacks that Palestinians in Gaza have been launching against the south in the last few days" according to Beersheba deputy mayor Heftziba Zohar. Later that night, a rocket killed a dog.

Barrages of rockets were fired at Beersheba and Ashkelon. Half of them were intercepted by the Iron Dome. Mortar shells fired at farmland in the Eshkol Regional Council contained phosphorus, which is designed to create a more intense fire after detonation. 40 rockets were fired on Sunday. Several structures were damaged and a car caught fire after two rockets were fired at Ashkelon. A three-month-old infant was injured by glass splinters.

A 13-year-old Palestinian boy, Mahmoud Abu Samra, was killed during the rocket attacks when a Palestinian Grad rocket fell short and landed in Gaza.

An informal ceasefire was agreed upon between Israel and Hamas after the Arab League held an "urgent meeting" in Cairo on August 21, 2011. Some 20 minutes after the ceasefire came into effect, a barrage of Qassam rockets and mortar shells was fired at Israel. The Iron Dome intercepted two rockets fired at Ashkelon. The Israeli Air Force attacked a militant cell in the northern Gaza Strip, wounding several people. The Islamic Jihad Movement and the Popular Resistance Committees said that they would not accept a ceasefire.

On August 23, four Qassam rockets were fired at Israel in breach of the ceasefire. The rockets landed in open areas and caused no casualties, but one caused a brushfire which spread to an area near two civilian communities and threatened local greenhouses. Firefighters managed to contain the blaze before it did any damage.

On August 24, more than 20 rockets were fired at Israeli communities. Grad rockets targeted the cities of Beersheba, Ashkelon, and Ofakim, injuring a nine-month-old baby. In Gaza, a senior Islamic Jihad member who funded the cross-border attacks was killed and two others wounded in an Israeli airstrike on a car. Israeli jets also fired at two militants after they were seen preparing to fire rockets. Several hours after the strike, two mortar shells landed in the western Negev, causing no casualties. Seven rockets were fired at Southern Israel, causing no damage or casualties. The Israeli Air Force attacked an Islamic Jihad rocket-launching cell, killing one militant. According to Palestinian media, the IDF fired shells at a militant squad in eastern Gaza after a rocket attack, but the cell escaped the strike. On August 25, the Islamic Jihad Movement announced that it would abide by the ceasefire. The same day, 15 rockets and mortar shells hit Southern Israel, hitting open areas near Ashkelon and in the Sha'ar HaNegev Regional Council. A mortar shell heavily damaged the Erez Crossing Terminal. Israel responded with airstrikes on several targets in the Gaza Strip. The two Islamic Jihad militants who had launched the mortar attack on the Erez Crossing were killed by an airstrike as traveled on their motorbike in northern Gaza. On August 26, two Qassam rockets hit open areas in the Sha'ar HaNegev Regional Council, and a Grad rocket exploded near Ashkelon. The Popular Front for the Liberation of Palestine claimed responsibility.

=== Egyptian protests ===
On August 21, 2011, media reported that the Egyptian authorities were recalling the Egyptian ambassador in Israel in response to the killing of five Egyptian security officers by Israeli soldiers after the attacks near Eilat. Egypt's foreign minister later stated that "at no point was there any intention on our part to recall our ambassador to Tel Aviv."

Following the media reports about the killing of the Egyptian security officers, demonstrations against Israel erupted in Cairo outside the Israeli embassy. The demonstrators threw fire crackers at the building, unfurled a Palestinian flag, and called for the expulsion of the Israeli ambassador in response to the killings. Eventually a young Egyptian, Ahmad Al-Shahhat, climbed to the roof of the apartment building which houses the Israeli embassy and removed the Israeli flag, replacing it with an Egyptian flag he had carried with him, becoming an instant folk hero in Egypt. The Israeli flag he had taken down was burned by protesters. During the demonstrations which continued for several days, thousands of protesters, shouting anti Israel slogans, called for the expulsion of the Israeli ambassador, the recalling of Egyptian ambassador to Israel, a review of the Camp David Accords and the opening of the border with the Gaza Strip. On Friday, August 26, 2011, a demonstration announced as "Million-man demonstration to expel the Israeli ambassador" took place in Cairo outside the Israeli embassy, drawing a few hundred protesters according to Haaretz.

=== Israeli apology to Egypt ===
In October 2011, The New York Times reported that Israel had sent a letter of apology to Egypt for the killing of the Egyptian security officers by Israeli forces.

== Official reactions ==
Involved parties

Israel:

- President Shimon Peres said "The series of severe terror events are an attempt by terror organizations to murder innocent civilians within Israel, and to disrupt our lives"
- Prime Minister Benjamin Netanyahu stated that this was a "serious incident in which Israeli citizens were hurt and the country's sovereignty was harmed."
- Defense Minister Ehud Barak stated "this is a grave terrorist incident in a number of locations. The incident reflects the weakness of Egypt's hold over Sinai and the spread of terrorist elements." He also blamed the attacks on Gazans and pledged that Israel will respond. "The source of the terror incidents is Gaza and we will act against them with all our strength and determination." He also expressed regret over the deaths of the Egyptian soldiers and ordered the IDF to conduct a military probe of the incident, and defense officials said it would likely be a joint probe with the participation of the Egyptian military.

Palestinian Authority:

- Palestinian Authority Chief-negotiator Saeb Erekat stated "Israel stands warned of any possible aggressive action or collective punishment measures against the Palestinian population in Gaza." Erekat stated that the Palestinian Authority is "against violence in all its forms," however, he added that such attacks should not be used by Israel as "a pretext for aggression."

Gaza Strip

- Hamas denied responsibility for the attacks but praised the attacks "...since they were against soldiers." Hamas warned Israel not to attack the Gaza Strip, following a statement by Defense Minister Ehud Barak that the IDF would strike back at the terrorist infrastructure in Gaza following a deadly triple terror attack. Hamas evacuated its command centers and sent senior commanders into hiding in anticipation of an IDF response.
- Popular Resistance Committee (PRC) spokesperson praised the attacks but said his group does not take any responsibility for launching it: "The occupation wants to pin this operation on us in order to escape its own internal problems."

Tawheed and Jihad, an al-Qaeda-linked group in the Gaza Strip, praised the attacks and said the "Jewish state should expect more." Over the internet, the group said "We in the Tawheed and Jihad group bless these blessed arms that pounded the fortifications of the vendetta-filled Jewish enemy in the so-called Eilat area in southern occupied Palestine."

Egypt:

- The Egyptian foreign ministry stated that "Egypt denounces the use of force against civilians in any circumstance and strongly advises Israel to immediately stop its military operations against Gaza".

Supranational

- United Nations – UN Secretary-General Ban Ki-moon on Thursday strongly condemned the attack but called for restraint. According to a UN statement, "the secretary-general hopes that the perpetrators are swiftly identified and brought to justice. He is concerned at the risk of escalation and calls for all to act with restraint."
- European Union – EU Chief Catherine Ashton condemned the attacks, and said "I have learned with deep concern of the series of terrorist attacks that has taken place in Southern Israel today, including against civilian targets, and in which several Israelis are reported to have lost their lives and many more to have been injured. I condemn unreservedly all such acts of terror, extend my condolences to the families of those who lost their lives in these attacks and express my wishes for a full and speedy recovery to the injured."
- The Middle East Quartet in a joint statement condemned the attacks and expressed concern "about the unsustainable situation in Gaza as well as the risk of escalation", and called for "restraint from all sides".

International

- Bulgaria – The Bulgarian Foreign Ministry condemned the attacks, saying: "We express our sincere condolences to the relatives of all victims. We are convinced that violence and terrorism cannot bring peace to the Middle East. Such acts do not help the efforts of the international community to bring the participants in the Middle East peace process back to the negotiations table."
- Canada – Canadian Foreign Affairs Minister John Baird condemned the attacks, saying: “Canada condemns in the strongest terms the terrorist attacks in southern Israel today. These cowardly attacks, particularly on civilian targets, are abhorrent and criminal. On behalf of all Canadians, I send my heartfelt condolences to those affected by today’s vicious attacks.” Furthermore, Baird said: "“Israel has a right to defend itself against such terrorist acts in conformity with international humanitarian law. Those responsible for these horrific attacks must be held accountable.”
- Costa Rica – The Ministry of Foreign Relations published an article condemning the attack, communicating its condolences to the people of Israel, specially to the victims and families of the murdered. The article stated that Costa Rica, as a peace-loving country, respectful of all human rights, expresses its most energetic disapproval of any kind of violence or terrorist attacks, regardless of the motives behind it.
- Germany – Foreign Minister Guido Westerwelle also condemned the attacks saying: "At this difficult hour we stand by the side of our Israeli friends. Those responsible must be prosecuted. Terror and violence must not be allowed to torpedo peace and negotiation efforts in the Middle East."
- Italy – Italian Foreign Affairs Minister, Franco Frattini, condemned the "barbaric" attacks on southern Israel and warned the international community to prevent more such attacks due to the unrest in the Arab world. He said: "I would like to express my condolences and closeness to the Israeli people and government for the loss of life in the barbaric attacks today."
- Netherlands – The Dutch Foreign Ministry condemned the attacks "in the strongest terms."
- Norway – Norwegian foreign minister Jonas Gahr Støre "condemned in the strongest possible terms" the acts of terror, adding that Norway condemns all use of terror
- United Kingdom – Minister for the Middle East Alistair Burt said that "I condemn these appalling and senseless acts of violence. As efforts for peace in the region continue, this brutality has no place, nor its perpetrators any excuse. My thoughts and prayers are with those killed and injured and I offer sincere condolences to their families and friends."
- USA – The State Department condemned the attacks "in the strongest terms," calling the attack "brutal and cowardly." Secretary of State Hillary Clinton said "We hope that those involved in the planning of these gruesome attacks will be brought to swift justice. We stand by Israel as our friend, partner, and ally – now and always." She also added that "This violence only underscores our strong concerns about the security situation in the Sinai Peninsula. Recent commitments by the Egyptian government to address the security situation in the Sinai are important and we urge the Egyptian government to find a lasting resolution."
- Russia – Russian Foreign Minister Sergey Lavrov spoke with Israeli Foreign Minister Avigdor Lieberman by telephone. Lavrov expressed his condolences over the terrorist attacks in southern Israel. He condemned this extremist act, and "reaffirmed the immutable position of Russia that there can be no justification for terror or for those who use it as means to achieve their ends". He also said that "despite the gravity of the crime, it is necessary to exercise restraint and to avoid retaliatory steps from which innocent people may suffer".

== Impact ==
Following the attacks on Highway 12, Israel is reportedly to soon allow Egypt to deploy thousands of troops in the Sinai Peninsula in violation of the Israeli-Egyptian peace treaty, in which both countries agreed that the Sinai Peninsula will be a military-free zone.

== Investigation ==
According to Haaretz, the IDF General Staff's investigation into the attack “was a source of great frustration”. An intelligence alert from the Shin Bet had led to a massive deployment of IDF troops in the area, but the forces' alertness had eroded, allowing the militants to track the IDF and choose their infiltration route. The decision not to close the road on the morning of the attack in spite of warnings from the Shin Beth is characterised as “understandable error of judgment, and definitely not a manifestation of carelessness”, whereas the appearance of the defense minister and the chief of staff at the scene of the incident while terrorists were still in the area is considered a serious security blunder that nearly culminated in another disaster.

== See also ==
- Coastal Road massacre
- Ma'ale Akrabim massacre
- 2011 Tel Aviv nightclub attack
- Israeli casualties of war
- August 2012 Sinai attack
