= Holot Halutza =

Coordinates: 31°05′00″N 34°27′25″E

Holot Halutza (Hebrew: חולות חלוצה, lit. 'Halutza Sands') is a desert area in the Negev, Israel. The sands of Holot Halutza are located southeast of the Gaza Strip and east of the Egypt-Israel barrier. The sands are almost uninhabited, and are used primarily as an IDF shooting range.

== Borders ==
Holot Halutza is bordered by the Gaza Strip and the Kerem Shalom kibbutz, but also to Route 211, a regional arterial road leading from the Nitzana Border Crossing in the west. According to the Ministry of Environmental Protection of Israel, the area covers approximately 1,090 square kilometers.

== Geography ==
Holot Halutza is characterized by dust storms typical to the area. It lies mostly at an elevation of 10 to 100 meters above sea level and contains a saline groundwater reservoir with a volume roughly twice that of the Sea of Galilee. However, this resource is utilized only by settlements in the Hevel Shalom for agricultural purposes.

The sands of Holot Halutza originated from the erosion of granite mountains in East Africa. They were carried along the Nile River toward the Mediterranean Sea and subsequently transported inland from northern Sinai by wind.

Land uses in the Holot Halutza include:

- Halutza National Park – A World Heritage Site containing the remains of a Nabatean city
- Agur Sands – A nature reserve in the area
- Nahal Sakhar Sands – A nature reserve in the eastern part of the area
- Shunra Sands – A nature reserve in the southern part of the area
- Hevel Shalom – A cluster of settlements and agricultural areas on the northern fringes of the area
- Fatah Nitzana – A cluster of settlements and agricultural areas on the southern fringes of the area
- Shetah Esh (lit. 'Fire Zones') – Most of the Halutza Sands are designated as fire zones used by the National Land Training Center.

== Settlement ==
In May 2001, the Israeli government approved a plan by Avigdor Lieberman and Prime Minister Ariel Sharon to establish five settlements in Holot Halutza, aiming to prevent the area from being included in any future land swaps with the Palestinians. In 2003, Be’er Milka was established, and by 2005, plans for Shlomit and the Halutzit settlements (later Bnei Netzarim and Neve) were approved.
