= Highway 13 (Israel) =

Expressway in southern Israel

Coordinates: 30°17′23″N 35°05′10″E

Highway 13
- כביש 13
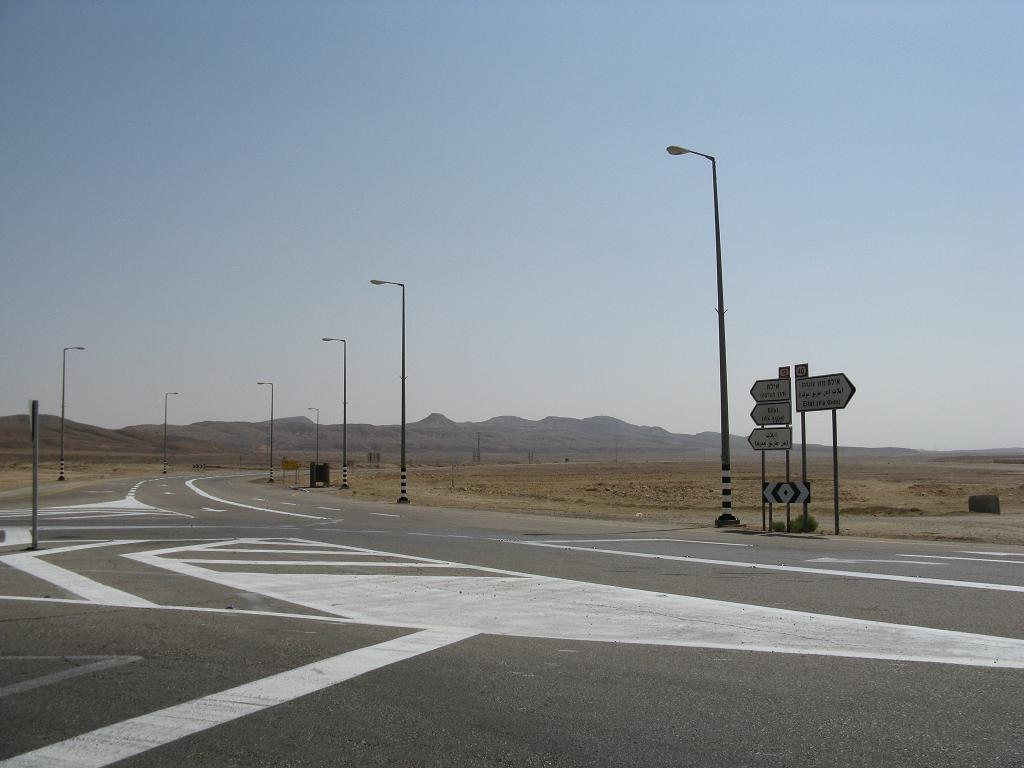
- Tzihor Junction

Route information
- Length: 11.38 km (7.07 mi)

Major junctions
- West end: Tzihor Interchange
- East end: Menuha Interchange

Location
- Country: Israel

Highway system
- Roads in Israel; Highways
← Highway 12	→ Highway 16

Highway 13 is an expressway in southern Israel. It is 12 km long. It begins in the north at Tzihor junction with Highway 40 and ends in the south at Menuha junction with Highway 90. Thus, it connects between Highway 40, which runs north to Mizpe Ramon and Beersheba via the central Negev, and Highway 90, which traverses the Arava region on Israel's eastern border.

== Junctions (West to East) ==
District	Location	km	mi	Name	Destinations	Notes
Southern	Tzihor Stream	0.00	0.00	צומת ציחור (Tzihor Junction)	Highway 40	
Southern	Menuha Stream	11.38	7.07	צומת מנוחה (Menuha Junction)	Highway 90	
1.000 mi = 1.609 km; 1.000 km = 0.621 mi

== See also ==
- List of highways in Israel
