= Highway 10 (Israel) =

Highway in Israel

Highway 10
- כביש 10
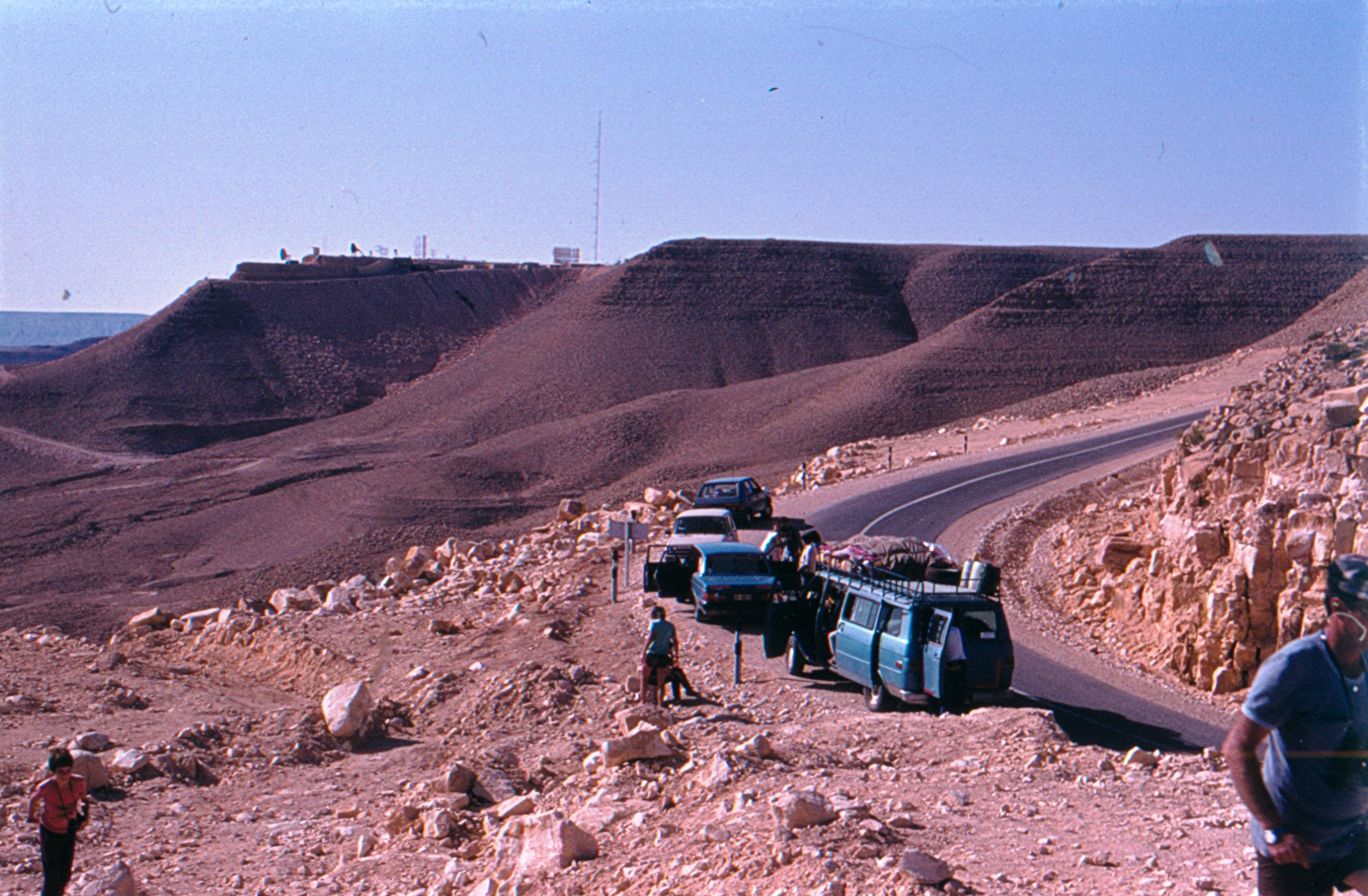

Route information
- Length: 192.51 km (119.62 mi)

Major junctions
- South end: Sayarim Valley
- North end: Kerem Shalom

Location
- Country: Israel

Highway system
- Roads in Israel; Highways
← Highway 9	→ Highway 12

Highway 10 is a road in the South District of Israel. It is one of the longest routes in Israel, extending for nearly the entire border of Israel with Egypt from the Gaza Strip in the north to Sayarim junction in the south. Under a military security advisory, its entire 192.5-kilometre (119 1/2 mi) length is almost permanently off-limits to civilian traffic.

== Features ==
The route begins in the north with the communities of Hevel Eshkol in the west, nearest to the Sinai Desert. The northern terminus is the intersection with Route 232 near Kerem Shalom. From there, it continues south adjacent to the border with Egypt. It passes by Nitzana and the Nitzana border crossing.

Highway 10 intersects with Route 211, which leads east toward Yeruham and Sde Boker. Farther south, Highway 10 intersects with Route 171, which leads east toward Mizpe Ramon.

The route continues south until Sayarim junction, where it meets Highway 12 in the mountains near Eilat. Highway 12 continues south to Eilat.

== Partial rerouting ==
A rerouting of part of the highway was approved by Israeli planning authorities in 2012. A 30-kilometer-long section of the highway will be relocated east, further away from Israel's border with Egypt than the original route. Originally, the plan had called for two lanes of traffic in either direction. After appeals from the Society for the Protection of Nature in Israel and other conservationists, who argued that the new highway would profoundly impact the local dune-based environment, the plan was modified to one traffic lane in either direction.

== Junctions (South to North) ==
District	Location	km	mi	Name	Destinations	Notes
Southern	Sayarim Valley	0.00	0.00	צומת סיירים (Sayarim Junction)	Highway 12	
Southern	Mount Harif	98.49	61.20	צומת הר חריף (Mount Harif Junction)	Route 171	
Southern	Nitzana Border Crossing	152.79	94.94	צומת מבוא חורב (Horev Entrance Junction)	Route 211	
Southern	Near Kerem Shalom	192.51	119.62	צומת ליד כרם שלום (Junction near Kerem Shalom)	Route 232	
1.000 mi = 1.609 km; 1.000 km = 0.621 mi

== See also ==
- List of highways in Israel
