= Netafim (disambiguation) =

Netafim is an Israeli irrigation technologies company.

Netafim (נְטָפִים), a Hebrew word meaning "drops of water", may refer to:

- Netafim Border Crossing, between Israel and Egypt
- Kiryat Netafim, Israeli settlement in the West Bank
- Ein Netafim, water spring in the mountains of Eilat
