= Route 211 (Israel) =

Arterial road in southern Israel

Coordinates: 31°57′53.9″N 35°2′33.6″E

Route 211
- כביש 211
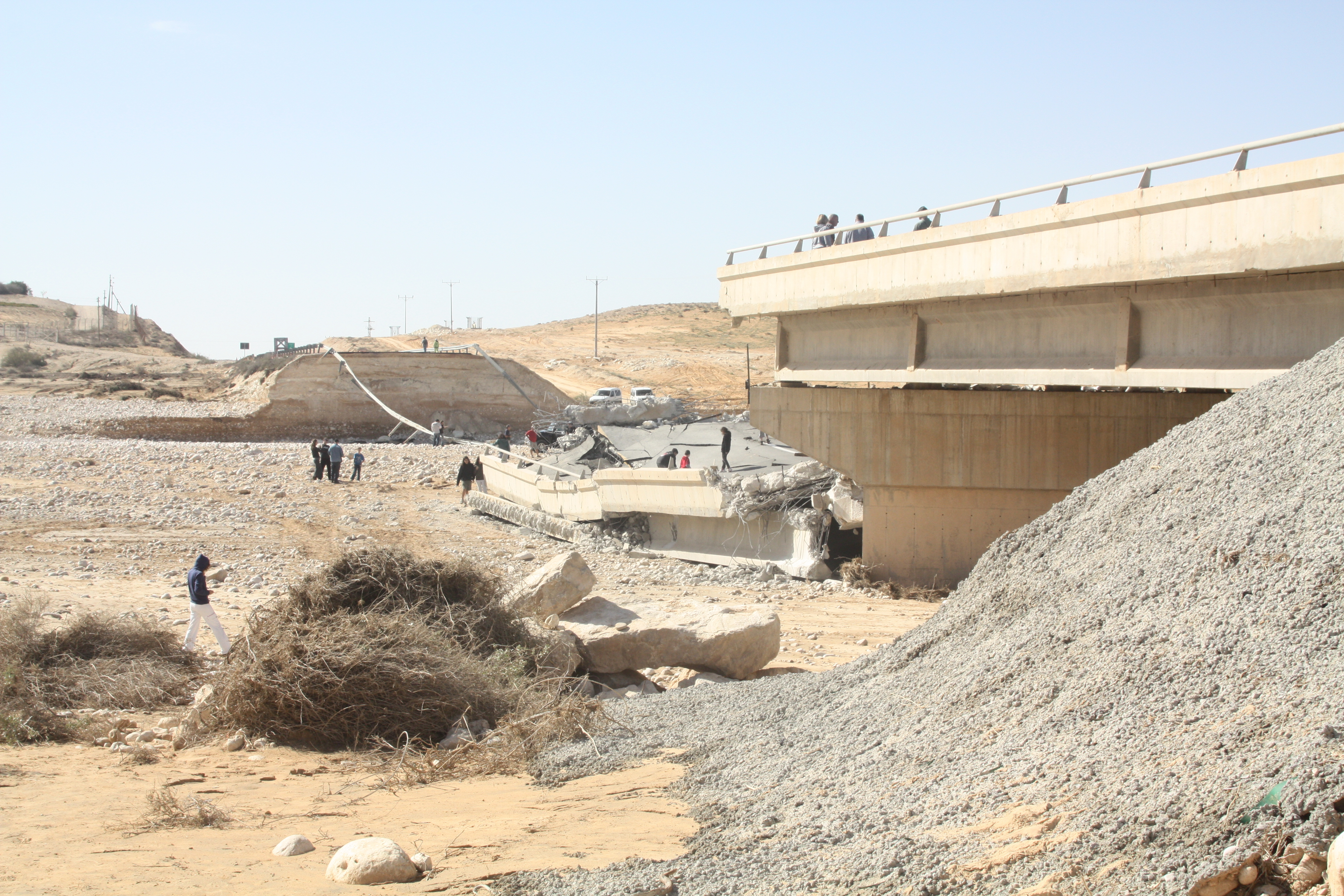
- Bridge over Nitzana Stream that was washed away by floods of January 2010

Route information
- Length: 41 km (25 mi)

Major junctions
- South end: Nitzana Border Crossing
- North end: Tlalim

Location
- Country: Israel

Highway system
- Roads in Israel; Highways
← Route 206	→ Route 222

Route 211 is a regional arterial road in southern Israel, leading from the Nitzana Border Crossing in the west, through the shoulder of Nitsana, Shadmat Sheizaf, Shunra sands and the Kora Valley to Ramat Boker. The road ends after 41 km, at the Tlalim junction in the center of the Negev, about 33 km (21 mi) south of Beersheba.

== History ==
Route 211 was paved by the British Mandate authorities during World War II as part of the preparations for a possible German invasion. The participation of Shmuel Mikunis in the construction of the road led to the name of the road: "Mykonis Road". In 1977, at the initiative of Yekutiel Adam, then the Deputy Chief of Staff, the re-paving of the previously very winding road was started.

On 18 January 2010, during floods that occurred in Nahal Nitsana, the bridge carrying the road over it collapsed, and the settlements of Pethat Nitsana were cut off.

== Junctions (West to East) ==
District	Location	km	mi	Name	Destinations	Notes
Southern	Nitzana Border Crossing	0	0.0	צומת מבצע חורב (Operation Horev Junction)	Highway 10	
Southern	Nitzana	2.5	1.6	צומת ניצנה (Nitzana Junction)	Road 2110	
Southern	Kmehin	5	3.1	צומת כמהין (Kmehin Junction)	Road 2114	
Southern	Ktzi'ot Prison	7	4.3	צומת קציעות (Ktzi'ot Junction)	Entrance to Ktzi'ot Prison	
Southern	Shivta	22	14	צומת שבטה (Shivta Junction)	Entrance to Shivta	
Southern	Ashalim	35	22	צומת אשלים (Ashalim Junction)	Road 2116	
Southern	Tlalim	41	25	צומת טללים (Tlalim Junction)	Highway 40	
1.000 mi = 1.609 km; 1.000 km = 0.621 mi

== See also ==
- List of highways in Israel
