= Mitzpe Ramon Airfield =

Mitzpe Ramon Airfield מנחת מצפה רמון
- IATA: MIP; ICAO: LLMR

Summary
- Serves: Mitzpe Ramon, Israel
- Elevation AMSL: 2,560 ft / 780 m
- Coordinates: 30°39′08″N 034°48′24″E

Map
- Location of the airport in Israel

Runways
Direction	Length		Surface
Direction	ft	m	Surface
18/36	4,600	1,400	Asphalt

Mitzpe Ramon Airfield (Hebrew: מִנְחָת מִצְפֵּה רָמוֹן) (IATA: MIP, ICAO: LLMR) is an Israeli airfield 4 kilometres (2.5 mi) in the north of the town of Mitzpe Ramon.
