= Netafim Border Crossing =

Border crossing between Israel and Egypt

Netafim Crossing מעבר נטפים
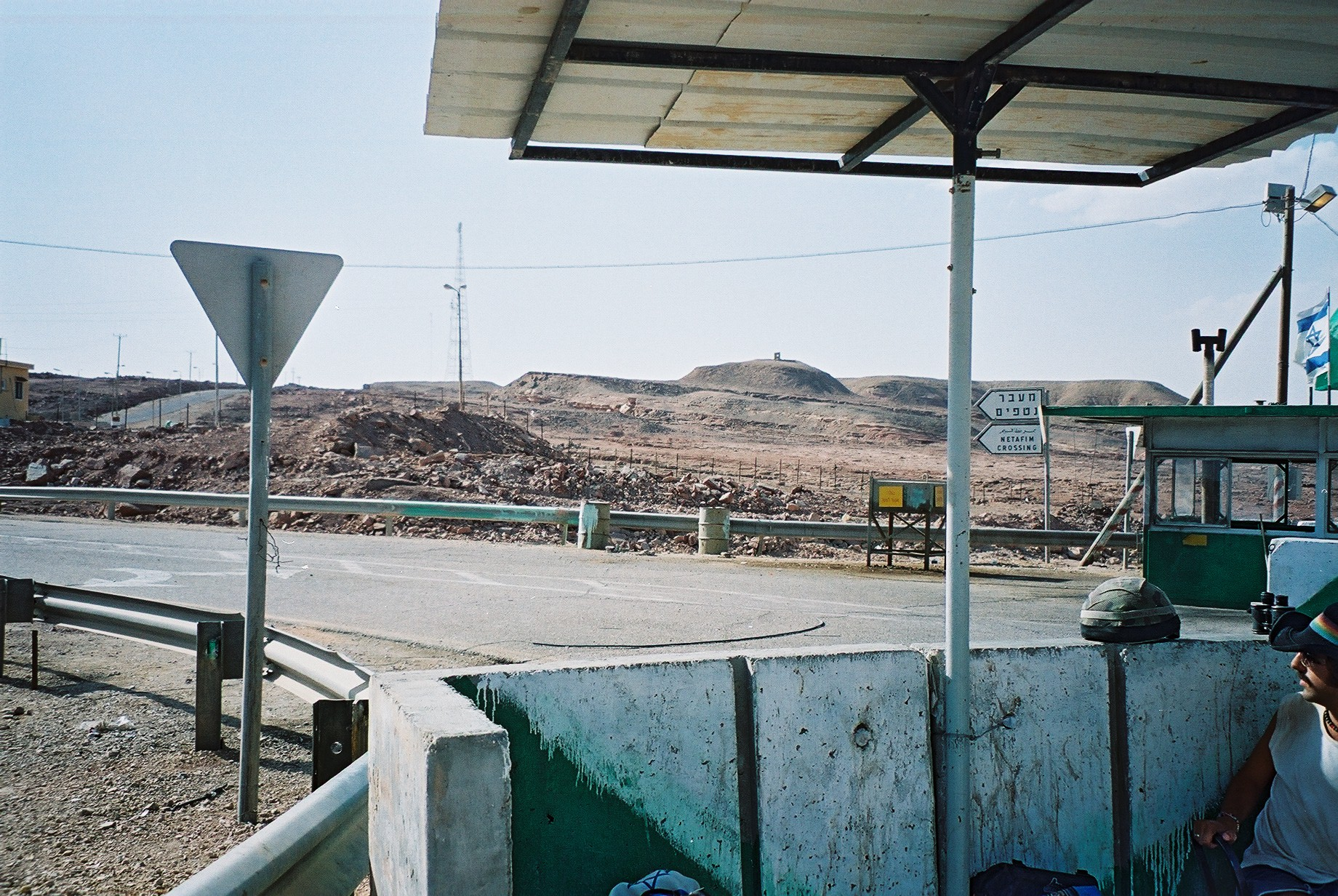
- View of the Netafim desert
- Coordinates: 29°35′56″N 34°52′04″E
- Crosses: Israel – Egypt Border
- Official name: Netafim Crossing מעבר נטפים
- Maintained by: Israel Airports Authority

The Netafim Border Crossing (Hebrew: מעבר נטפים) was a border crossing between Israel and Egypt. It was located adjacent to Highway 12, about 12 km north of Eilat, 1 km north west of Ein Netafim. As of 2023, the only two working crossing points between Israel and Egypt are the Taba-Eilat Border Crossing and the Nitzana Border Crossing.

The border line is guarded accurately on both sides, on the Israeli side alongside Highway 12 (one of the two accommodation roads to Eilat) by the Israel Border Police and on the Egyptian side from some army positions.

The border crossing is in the Israel National Trail's proximity but not actually on the route. Nevertheless, many wanderers who have lost their way arrive at the border crossing to drink some water.

== History ==
Today's border crossing sits at the eastern end of a mountain pass used by important roads throughout history. The medieval hajj road to Mecca coming from Egypt and the Maghreb passed through here, meeting with the one coming from Syria a little to the southeast, at the town of Aylah – modern-day Aqaba, the twin city of Eilat. The road coming from Egypt had to cross through a mountain pass in Sinai named either 'Aqabat Aylah ("the ascent of 'Aylah), Naqb al-'Aqabah ("the mountain pass of Aqaba") or Ras an-Naqb ("the head/promontory of the mountain pass"). Netafim/Ras an-Naqb keeps its strategic importance until today. The Egyptian military has a base at what is commonly spelled in Egypt as Ras El Naqb and an airport is also located there.

It should not be confused with other sites of the same name, some not far away, such as the Jordanian Ras an-Naqb in the desert between Petra and Aqaba, and the Ras an-Naqb village north of Beersheba fought over during World War I.

At the end of the 1948–49 Arab–Israeli War, on the last day of Operation Uvda on March 10, 1949, the Negev Brigade captured the abandoned position of the Jordanian Arab Legion in Ras an-Naqb (Hebrew ראס אל-נקב), exactly where the Netafim border crossing is located today.

During the Suez Crisis in 1956, Ras al-Naqb was again one of the strategic positions important for gaining control of the Sinai Peninsula.
