= Highway 12 (Israel) =

Highway in Israel

Coordinates: 29°54′39″N 34°52′33″E

Highway 12
- כביש 12
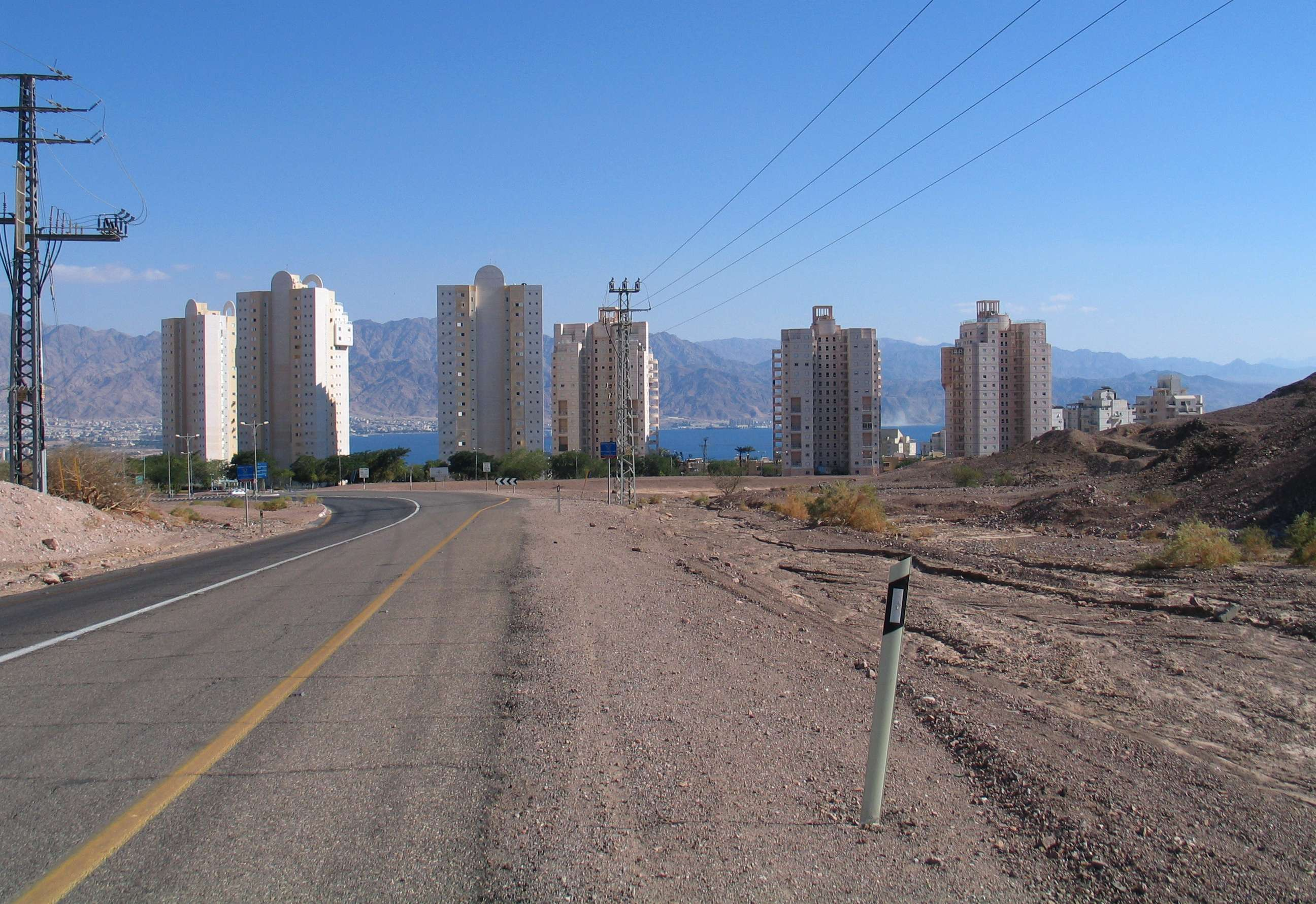
- Highway 12 entering Eilat

Route information
- Length: 71 km (44 mi)

Major junctions
- South end: Eilat city center
- HaNoflim Square; Chabad Square; Rabin Square; Yotam Square; Netafim Border Crossing; Sayarim Junction (Hwy 10); Entrance to Ovda Airport
- North end: Shizafon Junction

Location
- Country: Israel
- Major cities: Eilat

Highway system
- Roads in Israel; Highways
← Highway 10	→ Highway 13

Highway 12 is a single carriageway road in the South District of Israel. It surrounds the mountains of Eilat from the north and west, and it connects Eilat to Highway 10 and Highway 40, which lead toward central Israel. Highway 10 continues north toward the Gaza Strip, whereas Highway 40 proceeds to Beersheba via Mizpe Ramon.

== Description of the route from south to north ==
Highway 12 begins as an urban boulevard in Eilat exiting the city to the west. It then runs northwest toward the border of Israel with Egypt. Then it turns north past the Netafim Border Crossing and the northern mountains of Eilat.

At Sayarim junction it intersects with Highway 10. It continues northeast past Ovda airport and reaches its north terminus at Shizafon junction, where it intersects with Highway 40.

== Junctions (south to north) ==
District	Location	km	mi	Name	Destinations	Notes
Southern	Eilat	0	0.0	אילת (Eilat)	HaGai Street; Highway 90	
Southern	Netafim Border Crossing	12	7.5	מעבר נטפים (Netafim Crossing)	Entrance road	
Southern	Sayarim Valley	41	25	צומת סיירים (Sayarim Junction)	Highway 10	
Southern	Uvda	56	35		Entrance road to Ovda Airport	
Southern	Shaharut	65	40		Road 1101	
Southern	Neot Semadar	71	44	צומת שיזפון (Shizafon Junction)	Highway 40	
1.000 mi = 1.609 km; 1.000 km = 0.621 mi

== See also ==
- List of highways in Israel
