= Ein Netafim =

Coordinates: 29.597014°N 34.883171°E

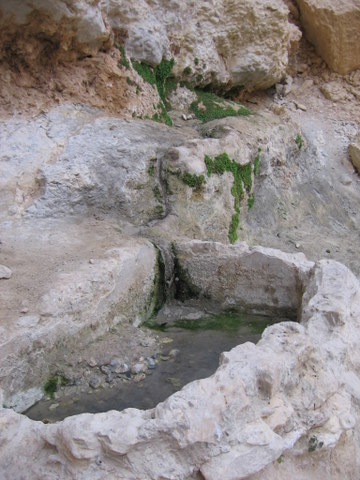
The basin in Ein Netafim

Ein Netafim is a water spring in the Eilat mountains located near the Israeli border with Egypt. The spring is located about seven kilometers north of the city of Eilat, near the Highway 12 road which leads to Eilat.

Ein Netafim is the only natural water source in the Eilat Mountains that is flowing all year round and serves as the main source of drinking water for the animals in its surrounding. During the evening and the night various animals tend to gather in the site in order to drink from the spring water. The more prevalent animals whom gather at the site are gazelles, goats, rabbits and birds.

== History ==
In 1950 Israel attempted to construct an agriculture settlement nearby which was eventually abandoned. Until the Six-Day War an Israeli military post existed nearby Ein Netafim.

The spring also influenced the determined of the boundary line between the British Empire and the Ottoman Empire, which is the border between Israel and Egypt today. The British built a basin at the site to collect the spring water. The basin was destroyed during a subsequent rock collapse. In 1965 the staff of the Eilat Field School constructed a new basin, but it was also destroyed in a flood. The most recent basin was built in 1968.

The area of Ein Netafim on Highway 12 was the site of two major terror attacks—one in 1990 and one in 2011.
