= Mount Harif =

Mountain in Negev Desert, Israel

- Location within Israel

Highest point
- Elevation: 1,012 m (3,320 ft)
- Coordinates: 30°29′44″N 34°33′33″E

Geography
- Location: Negev, Israel

Mount Harif (Hebrew: הר חריף) is a mountain at an elevation of 1,012 metres (3,320 ft) located in the Negev desert in southern Israel.

The mountain is located in the central part of the Negev desert, about 85 km (53 mi) southwest of the city of Beersheba, 112 km (70 mi) northwest of the city of Eilat, at the border with Egypt. The mountain is the second highest peak in the Negev desert, after the peak of Mount Ramon. An IDF military base is situated on the mountain due to its strategic location on the border with Egypt.

Remains of a prehistoric settlement have been discovered in the past in the site. A cluster of 17 water cisterns exist approximately 5 km east of the mountain which were estimated to have been built during the reign of king Solomon, and were active apparently until the Babylonian exile. Some of the water cisterns still fill up with water during the winter seasons.

On 21 September 2012 IDF forces, whom were safeguarding civilian workers constructing the Israel–Egypt barrier, were ambushed by three heavily armed militants who opened fire at them and managed to kill one soldier and lightly injured another.

== See also ==
- Harifian culture
