= Nitzana Border Crossing =

International border crossing between Egypt and Israel

Nitzana Crossing معبر نيتسانا מעבר ניצנה
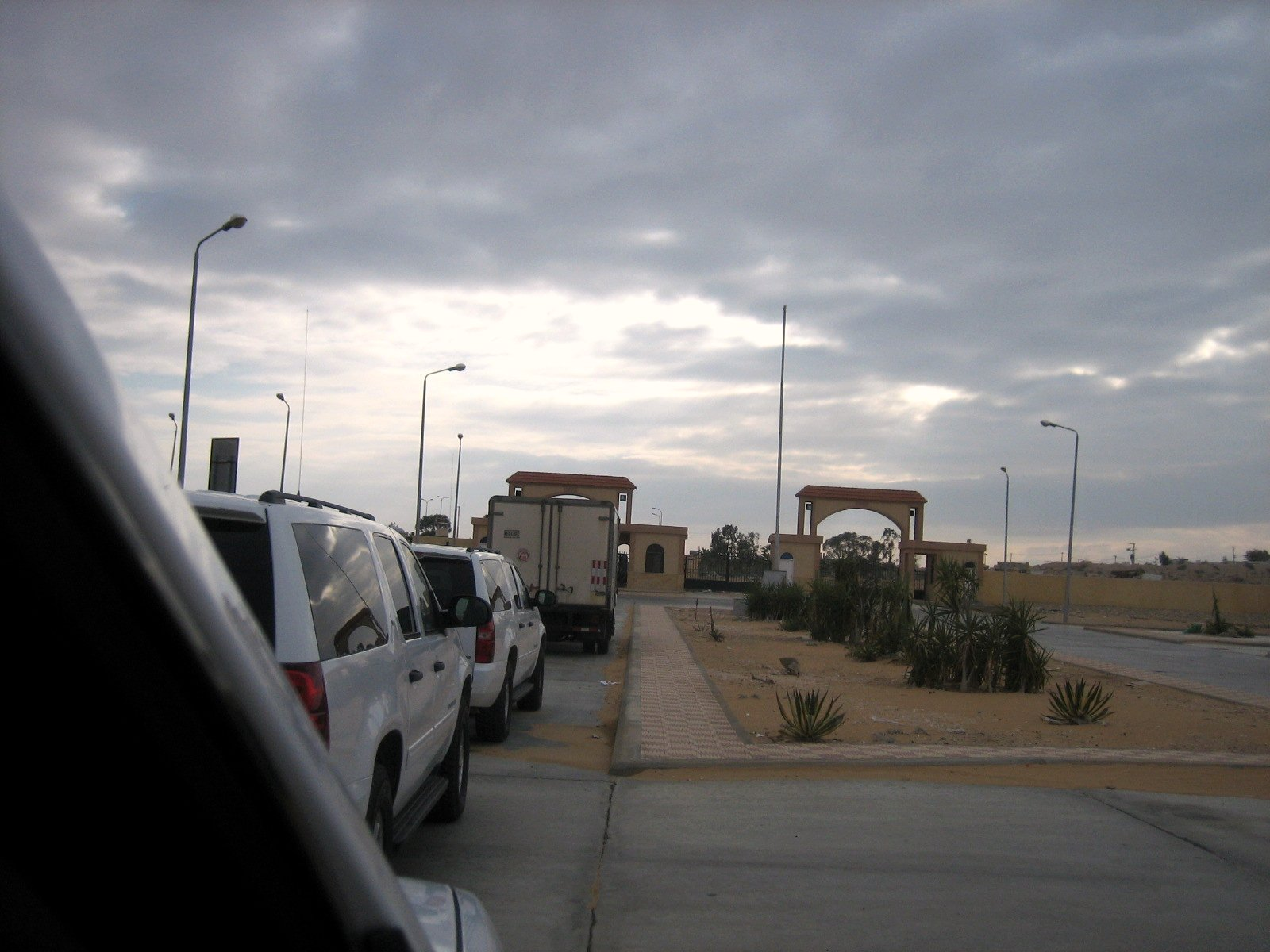
- Nitzana Border Crossing (on the Egyptian side)
- Coordinates: 30°52′56″N 34°23′40″E
- Carries: Containers
- Crosses: Border between Egypt and Israel
- Locale: Abu Ujaylah, Egypt; Nitzana, Israel
- Official name: Nitzana Border Crossing; מעבר ניצנה; معبر نيتسانا
- Maintained by: Arab Republic of Egypt; Israel Airports Authority

Characteristics
- Total length: 200 metres (Israeli side)
- Width: 45 metres (Israeli side)

Statistics
- Daily traffic: 16 vehicles in 2005
- Toll: ₪101.00 (Outbound Israel)

Location
- Interactive map of Nitzana Crossing

The Nitzana Border Crossing (Arabic: معبر نيتسانا, Hebrew: מעבר ניצנה), also called the Eliav Border Crossing (Hebrew: מעבר לובה אליאב), is an international border crossing between El Ouga in Egypt and Nitzana in Israel.

== History ==
Opened in 1982, the crossing used to handle pedestrians as well as private vehicles, with the majority of the crossings taking place at the Taba Border Crossing in Eilat and the Rafah Border Crossing in Rafah, Israel decided to close the crossing to tourists. Following Israel's 2005 Gaza disengagement, Israel lost control of the Rafah Broder Crossing, so it examined the possibly of reopening the crossing to tourists.

As of 2007, the terminal handles only commercial trade between the two nations. The terminal is open from Sunday to Thursday, 8:00 to 17:00. It is closed from Friday to Saturday as well as Jewish and Islamic holidays.

In February 2013, the crossing was named after Aryeh Eliav, who among other things founded the nearby Nitzana Youth Village.

On 2 June 2023, a trooper of the Central Security Forces crossed over the Egypt–Israel border into Israeli territory around the Nitzana Border Crossing, shooting three Israeli soldiers dead and injuring two others before he was killed in a shootout with the Israel Defense Forces.

=== Israel Gaza war ===
During the early stages of the Gaza war, the border crossing was used to inspect aid bound for the Gaza Strip. While cargo was inspected at Nitzana, trucks then drove 50 kilometres (31 mi) to the Rafah Border Crossing to enter Gaza from Egypt. On 2 February 2024, Israeli protesters blocked the crossing to prevent humanitarian aid from entering Gaza. On 11 April 2024, the Israeli police arrested protesters at the Nitzana Crossing who tried to block aid from reaching Palestinian civilians in Gaza.

== Terminals ==
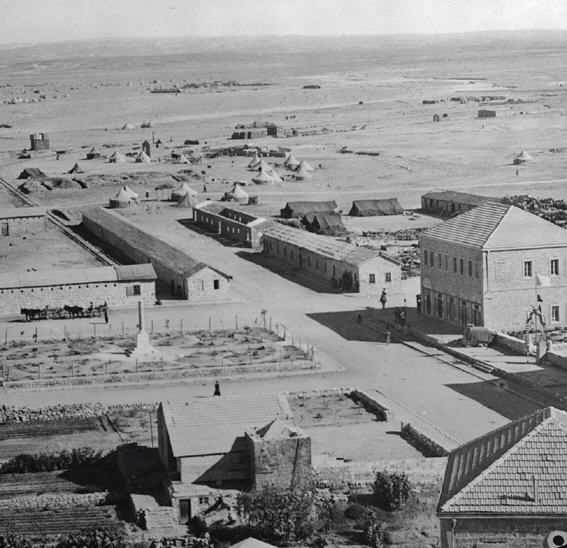
Nitzana 1946

=== Egypt ===
The Egyptian terminal is accessible via the Ismaïlia-Abu Ujaylah highway in Shamal Sina' (North Sinai).

=== Israel ===
The Israeli border terminal can be reached via Route 211, which ends at Nitzana Border Crossing, and Highway 10, which passes alongside the crossing. The border terminal can also be reached by Metropoline bus number 44 from Beersheba's central bus station.
