= Roads in Israel =

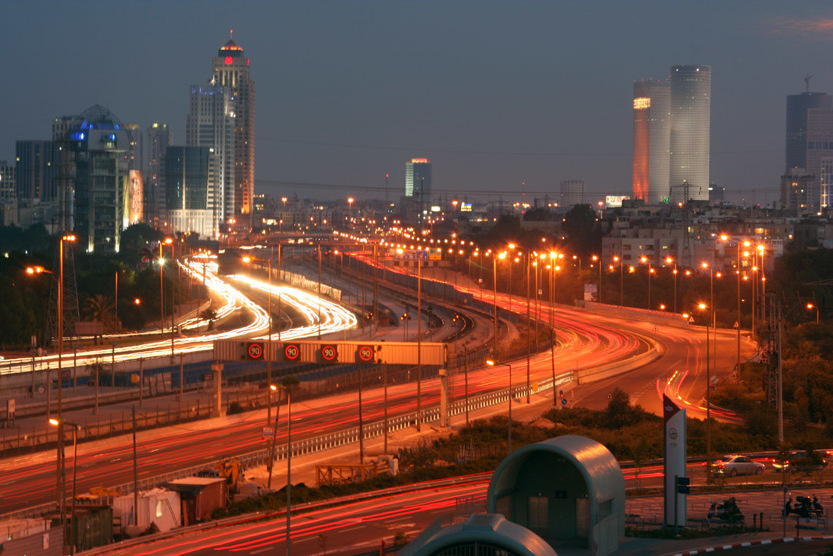
Ayalon Highway near Tel Aviv

Road sign in Israel, with Israel's official language (Hebrew) as well as Arabic and English markings

Israel has a well-developed road network spanning the entire country. This network is undergoing constant improvement and expansion to accommodate the rising number of vehicles on its roadways, reduce commute times, and facilitate the outward de-concentration of residential, business, and government centers north and south of the country's center.

== The National Roads Authority of Israel ==
Founded in 2003, the National Roads Authority of Israel plans, develops and maintains most of the inter-city roads in Israel. This authority also builds and plans interchanges, bridges etc. The road length that is under control of the authority is approximately 6,500 km long. Some inter-city routes are built by concessionaires and private companies in exchange for payment from the government, outside of the responsibility of the National Roads Authority, while others are developed and maintained by regional or municipal road authorities. The National Roads Authority of Israel took over the responsibility for most of Israel's intercity roads from the Public Works Department (PWD) in 2003. Modern road development in the country began during the British Mandate of Palestine. In 1921 the Mandate government founded an engineering branch for carrying out infrastructure projects, this later became the PWD, which later evolved into the National Roads Authority of Israel. In ancient Israel the development of an unpaved yet extensive road system has been attributed to efforts under King Solomon (Herzog and Gichon, 1978, p. 121).

== Numbering of the roads ==
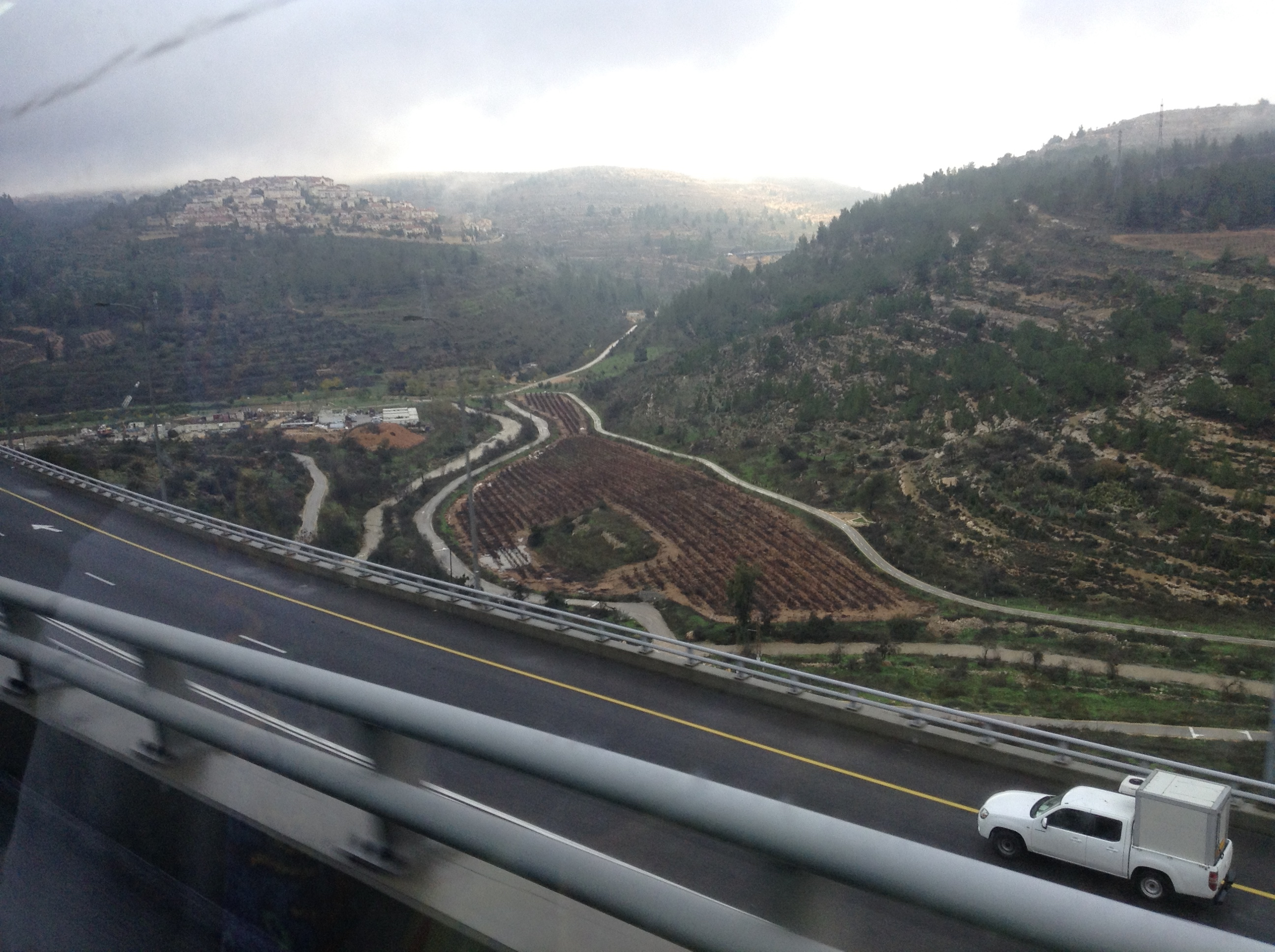
Highway 1: from Jerusalem to Tel Aviv

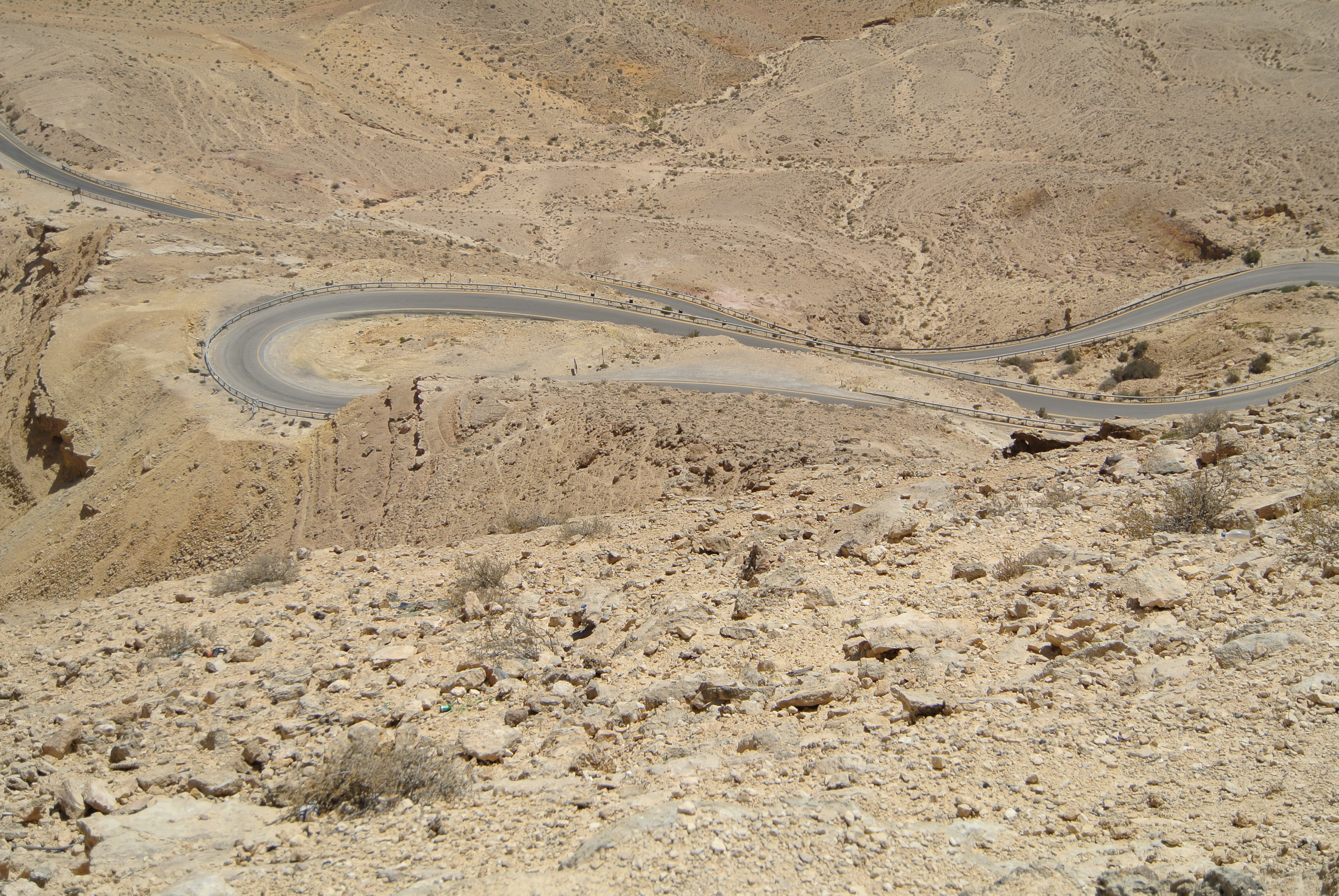
Route 225 descending into Makhtesh Gadol.

Roads in Israel are categorized as national roads, inter-city roads, regional roads and local roads:

National roads – numbered with one digit (e.g. Route 1, Jerusalem-Tel Aviv)

Inter-City roads – numbered with two digits (e.g. Highway 10 (Israel) – Route 10)

Regional roads – numbered with three digits (e.g. Route 293)

Local roads – numbered with four digits (e.g. Route 8900, Safed-Rosh Pinna)

Often even numbered roads run from south to north (e.g. Highway 2, Tel Aviv-Haifa). Odd numbered roads go from west to east (e.g. Highway 5, the Mediterranean Sea coast to Samaria).

As a general rule, for highways with the same number of digits, numbers rise from south to north, and from west to east. Thus, Highways 12 and 13 are located in the far south of Israel, whereas Highways 98 and 99 meet near Mount Hermon in the far northeast of the country. There are some exceptions to this: for example, Highway 1 runs mostly north of Highway 3.

== List of highways in Israel ==
There are 47 designated highways in Israel, of those six are Freeways, six are partially freeways and partially expressways and 35 are expressways. Two of the expressways are divided into separate sections as a result of an IDF decree forbidding Israelis from traveling on certain stretches of these highways.

== See also ==
- Transportation in Israel
