= Mitzpe Ramon =

Local council in Israel

Mitzpe Ramon: מִצְפֵּה רָמוֹן; متسبي رمون
- Local council

Hebrew transcription(s)
  - ISO 259: Miçpe Ramon
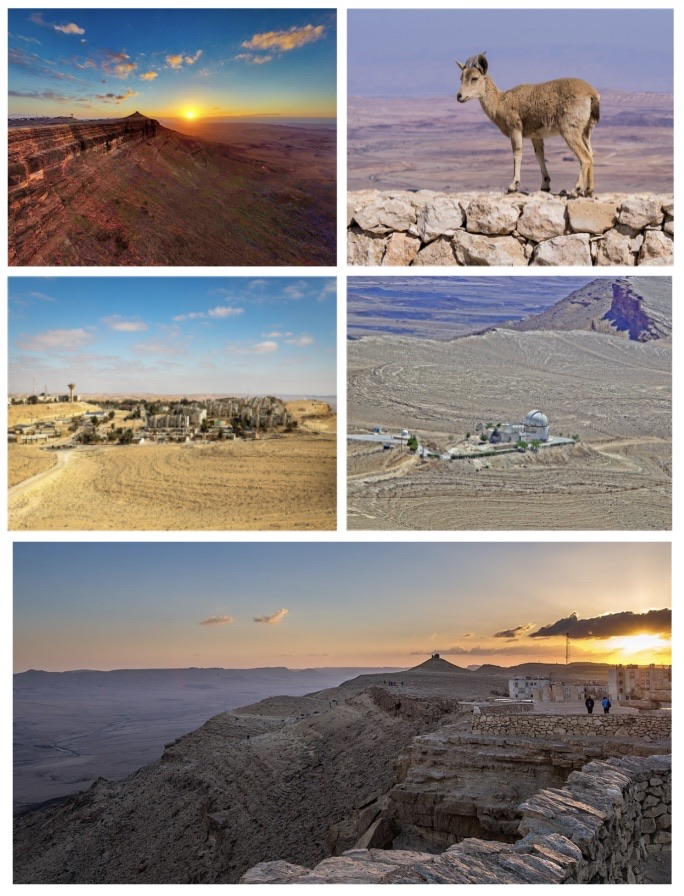
- View of Mitzpe Ramon from Har Gamal, Picture of Nubian ibex, Wise Observatory, Crater View

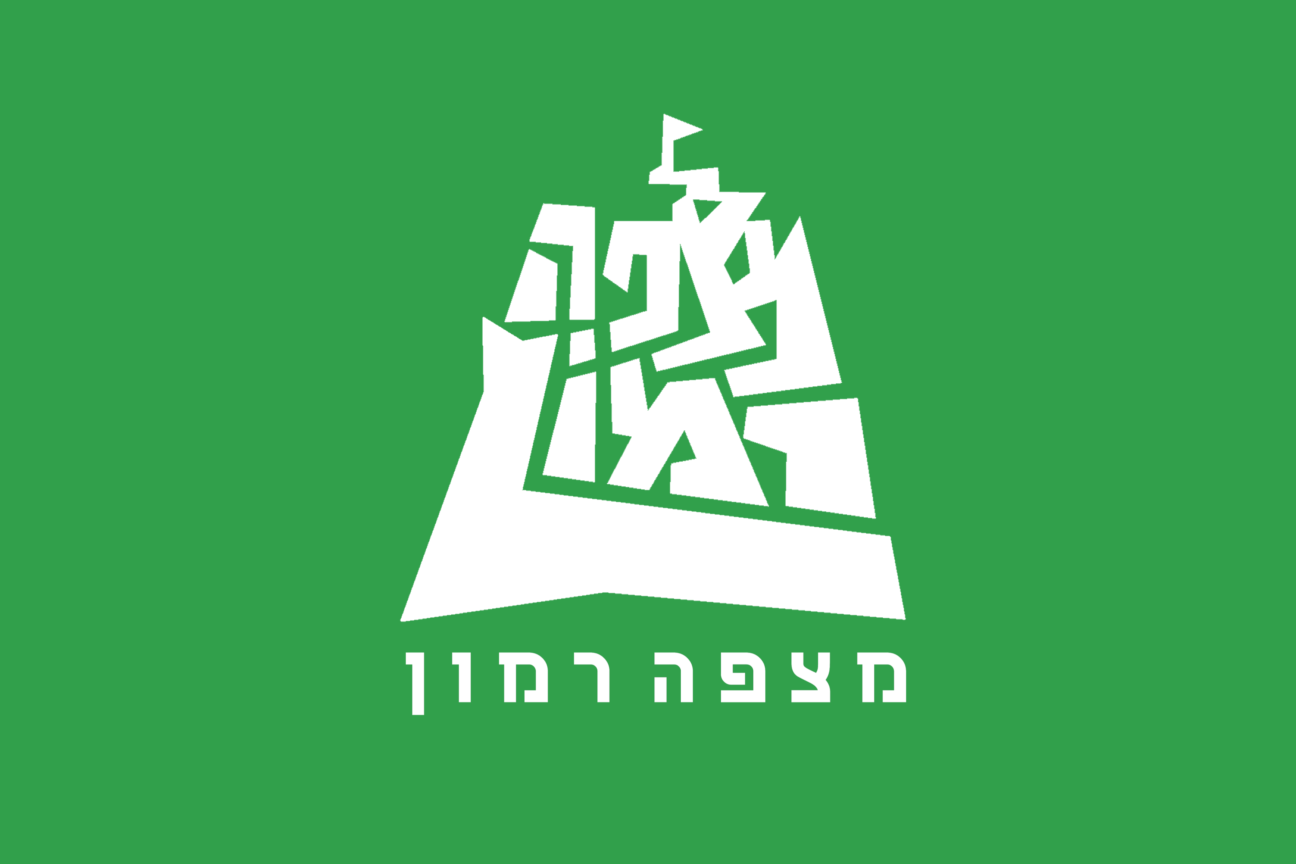
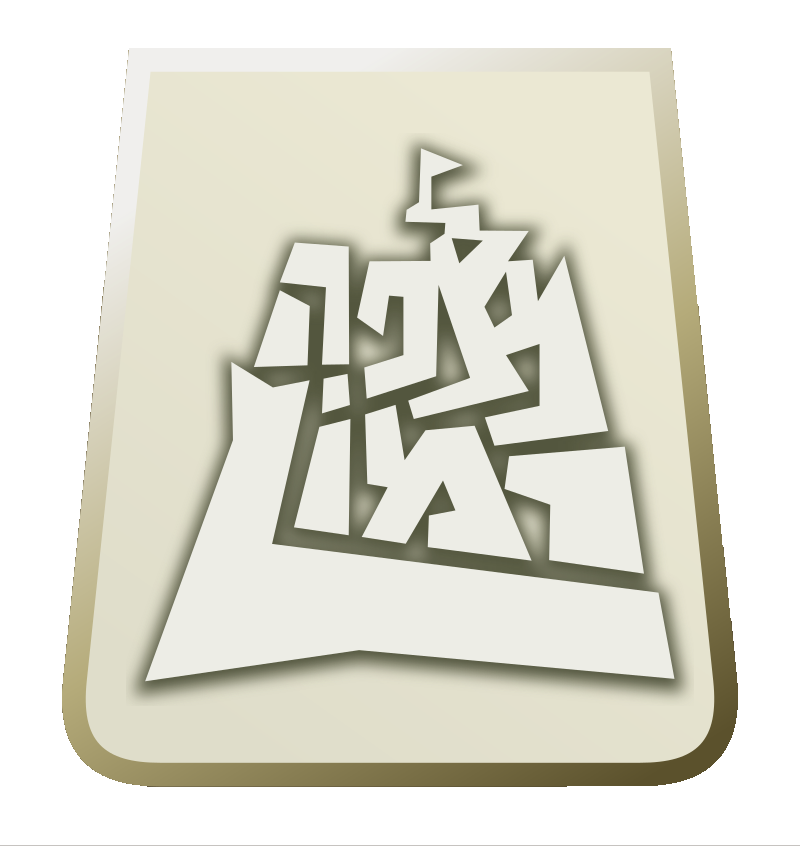
- Flag Coat of arms

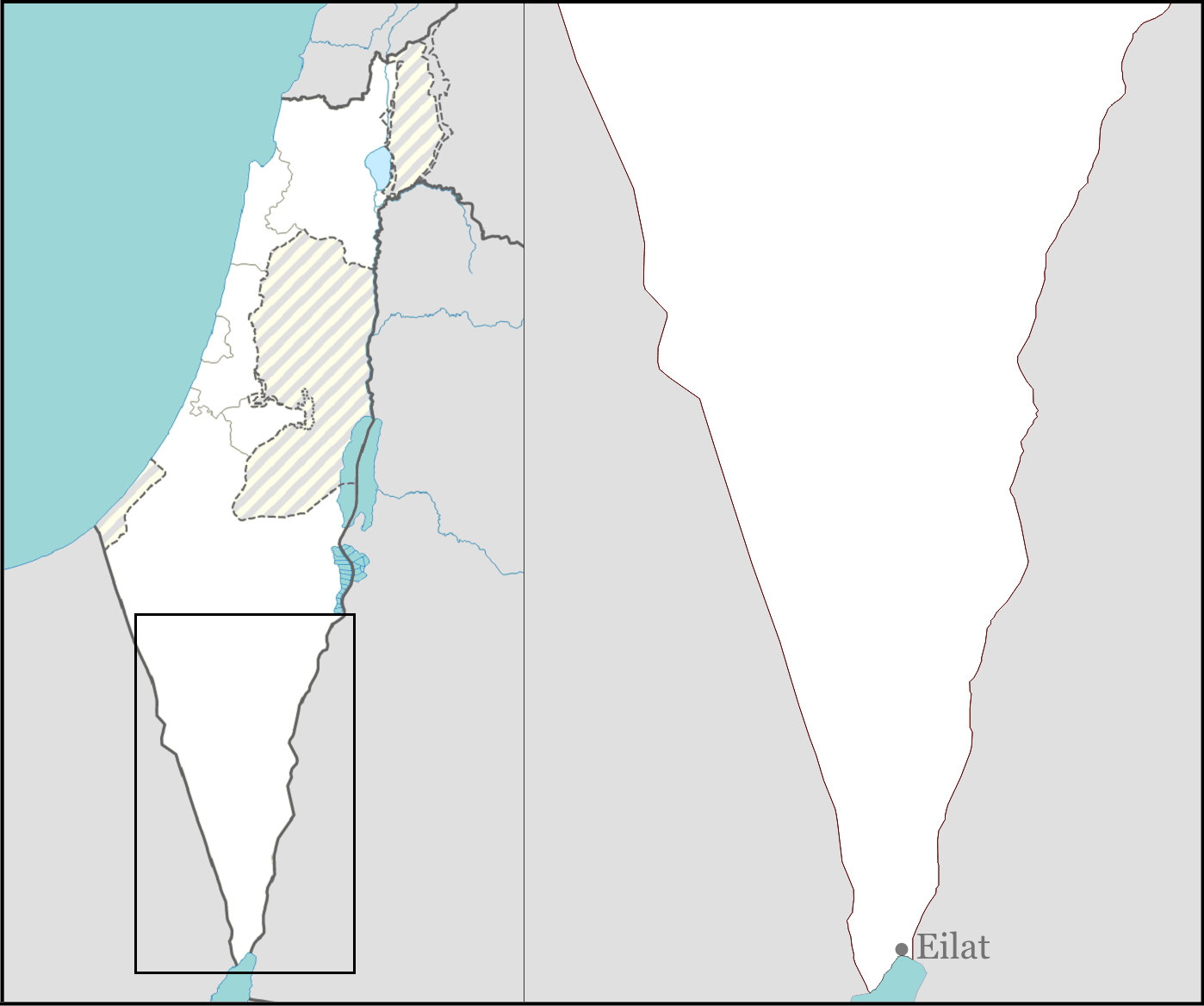
- Location within Southern Negev region of Israel Location within Israel
- Coordinates: 30°36′46″N 34°48′14″E
- Country: Israel
- District: Southern
- Subdistrict: Beersheba
- Natural Region: Northern Negev Mountains
- Founded: 1951

Government
  - Head of Municipality: Elia Winter

Area
  - Total: 62,875 dunams (62.875 km^{2}; 24.276 sq mi)
- Elevation: 839 m (2,753 ft)

Population (2024)
  - Total: 5,843
  - Density: 92.93/km^{2} (240.7/sq mi)
- Name meaning: Ramon Lookout
- Website: mitzpe-ramon.muni.il

Mitzpe Ramon (Hebrew: מִצְפֵּה רָמוֹן, Ramon Lookout; Arabic: متسبي رمون) is a local council in the Negev desert of southern Israel. It is situated on the northern ridge at an elevation of 860 meters (2,800 feet) overlooking the world's largest erosion cirque, known as the Makhtesh Ramon. In 2024 it had a population of 5,843.

== History ==
Mitzpe Ramon in 1957

Mitzpe Ramon was founded in 1951 as a camp for the workers building Highway 40. The town's first permanent residents, several young families from Kibbutz Re'im and other parts of Israel began settling there in 1956. After five years, the town was home to 370 residents including 160 children, most of them veteran Israelis. There were also 180 housing units to absorb new immigrants They were joined by immigrants from North Africa, Romania, and India in the 1960s, and it became the southernmost of the Negev's development towns.

Conditions in the early years were harsh, with limited food supplies and practically no modern-day amenities. Ice blocks and provisions were delivered once a week by a supply truck. There was a single school with one classroom for all ages. The homes of the first settlers were prefabricated asbestos barracks. Later, rows of small attached stone houses were built and after that, apartment buildings, beginning in the early 1960s.

On 29 April 1964, a Nord 2501D Noratlas (4X-FAD/044) of the IAF crashed into a mountain near Mitzpe Ramon, killing all nine on board, including pilots Hagay Gilboa and Shlomo Tzlil. The crash is currently Israel's deadliest.

In 1972, Mitzpe Ramon had a population of about 1,400 people living in 300 households. The town further grew after Ramon Airbase was completed in 1982. In 1988, the town had a population of about 3,000, and it experienced more significant population growth when it absorbed Soviet immigrants during the 1990s post-Soviet aliyah.

In February 2026, it was announced that Mitzpe Ramon will become Israel's "Space City". Funded by government and private organizations, the project aims to establish the largest civilian space ecosystem in the country, including a technology campus, a space mission control center, laboratories simulating the Mars environment, a startup accelerator program, and an academic campus dedicated to international research.

== Geology and climate ==
Ramon Crater, known as a makhtesh Ramon, is 38 km long, 6 km wide and 450 meters deep.

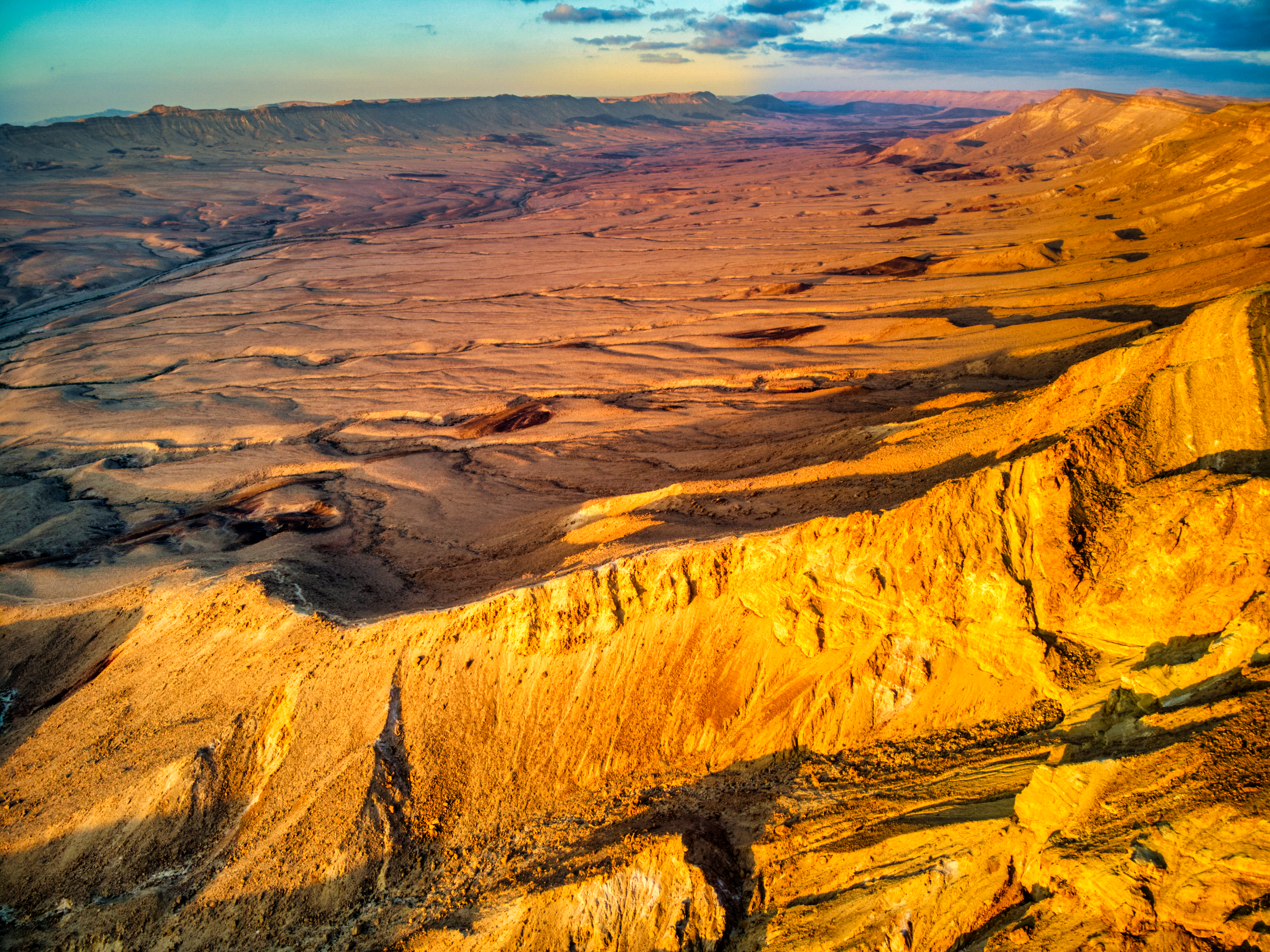
Makhtesh Ramon

Mitzpe Ramon's climate borders between hot desert climate and cold desert climate (Köppen climate classification: BWh/BWk), characterized by hot, dry summers and cold winters. There are moderate to strong winds all year long, caused by its location above the crater, which make Mitzpe Ramon feel much colder than it really is. Precipitation is scarce, concentrated around the winter months, with an annual precipitation amount of roughly 70 millimetres (2.8 in). Snowfall occurs on average once in a couple of years. Night frost occurs almost every winter.

Climate data for Mitzpe Ramon (Temperature: 1987–2010, Precipitation: 1980–2010)
Month	Jan	Feb	Mar	Apr	May	Jun	Jul	Aug	Sep	Oct	Nov	Dec	Year
Record high °C (°F)	28.0 (82.4)	29.1 (84.4)	33.5 (92.3)	36.4 (97.5)	39.6 (103.3)	40.9 (105.6)	39.6 (103.3)	39.2 (102.6)	37.8 (100.0)	37.4 (99.3)	31.1 (88.0)	29.0 (84.2)	40.9 (105.6)
Mean maximum °C (°F)	20.4 (68.7)	23.1 (73.6)	27.4 (81.3)	33.3 (91.9)	35.2 (95.4)	35.8 (96.4)	36.0 (96.8)	34.8 (94.6)	34.2 (93.6)	32.4 (90.3)	26.9 (80.4)	22.4 (72.3)	36.0 (96.8)
Mean daily maximum °C (°F)	13.3 (55.9)	14.6 (58.3)	18.2 (64.8)	22.9 (73.2)	26.9 (80.4)	29.3 (84.7)	31.0 (87.8)	30.7 (87.3)	28.4 (83.1)	25.1 (77.2)	19.9 (67.8)	15.5 (59.9)	23.0 (73.4)
Daily mean °C (°F)	9.9 (49.8)	10.8 (51.4)	13.5 (56.3)	17.4 (63.3)	21.2 (70.2)	23.4 (74.1)	25.4 (77.7)	25.0 (77.0)	23.0 (73.4)	20.3 (68.5)	16.0 (60.8)	12.1 (53.8)	18.2 (64.7)
Mean daily minimum °C (°F)	6.6 (43.9)	6.9 (44.4)	8.8 (47.8)	11.8 (53.2)	15.4 (59.7)	17.6 (63.7)	19.7 (67.5)	19.3 (66.7)	17.6 (63.7)	15.5 (59.9)	12.2 (54.0)	8.7 (47.7)	13.3 (56.0)
Mean minimum °C (°F)	2.0 (35.6)	2.3 (36.1)	3.6 (38.5)	5.9 (42.6)	9.5 (49.1)	12.7 (54.9)	15.7 (60.3)	15.9 (60.6)	14.7 (58.5)	11.4 (52.5)	7.7 (45.9)	4.2 (39.6)	2.0 (35.6)
Record low °C (°F)	−4.0 (24.8)	−3.0 (26.6)	−1.0 (30.2)	−0.8 (30.6)	6.0 (42.8)	10.2 (50.4)	13.0 (55.4)	14.0 (57.2)	11.5 (52.7)	9.0 (48.2)	2.6 (36.7)	−0.5 (31.1)	−4.0 (24.8)
Average rainfall mm (inches)	19 (0.7)	13 (0.5)	11 (0.4)	3 (0.1)	1.5 (0.06)	0 (0)	0 (0)	0 (0)	0.1 (0.00)	4 (0.2)	6 (0.2)	12 (0.5)	69.6 (2.66)
Average rainy days (≥ 0.1 mm)	6.0	4.9	4.1	1.7	0.5	0	0	0	0.1	0.9	2.6	4.6	25.4
Source: Israel Meteorological Service

== Demographics ==
Historical population
Year	Pop.	±%
1972	1,400	—
1983	2,900	+107.1%
1995	4,300	+48.3%
2008	4,800	+11.6%
2022	5,385	+12.2%
2024	5,842	+8.5%

== Economy ==
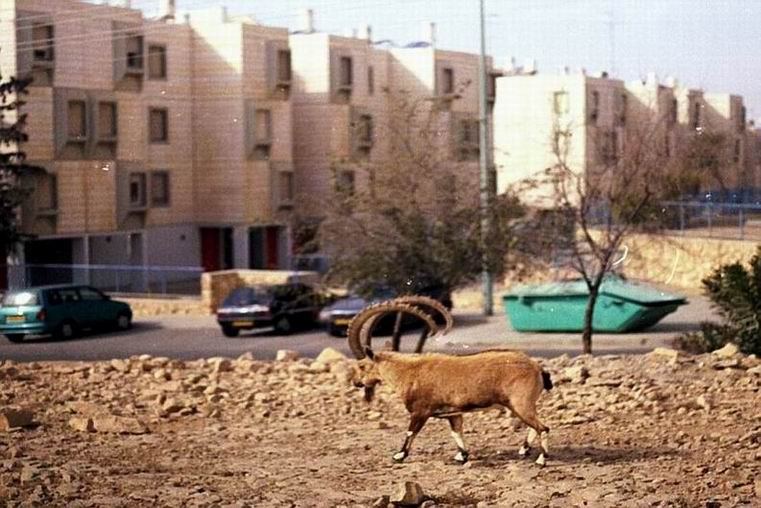
Mitzpe Ramon street scene

The development of Mitzpe Ramon was adversely affected by the opening of Route 90 in the late 1960s. After the inauguration of this highway, traffic to and from Eilat bypassed Mitzpe Ramon almost entirely. However, growing interest in ecotourism, Jeep trekking (access to Nabatean ruins), mountain biking and hiking, stargazing and the upgrading of Route 40, which is considered a more scenic route to Eilat, have improved the economy.

Jerusalem Marble, one of a few major suppliers and overseas exporters of Jerusalem stone (established in 1923), inaugurated a state-of-the-art factory in Mitzpe Ramon in January 2000. Jerusalem Stone is exported globally.

Mitzpe Ramon has six hotels and dozens of bed and breakfast establishments. In 2011, the Isrotel hotel chain opened a luxury hotel, the Beresheet Hotel, in Mitzpe Ramon.

The Tourism Ministry allocated NIS 9.5 million for infrastructure development in Mitzpe Ramon, and the Ministry for the Development of the Negev and Galilee financed the construction of a landing strip for light aircraft. In December 2013, a Las Vegas-style Casino was planned for the town.

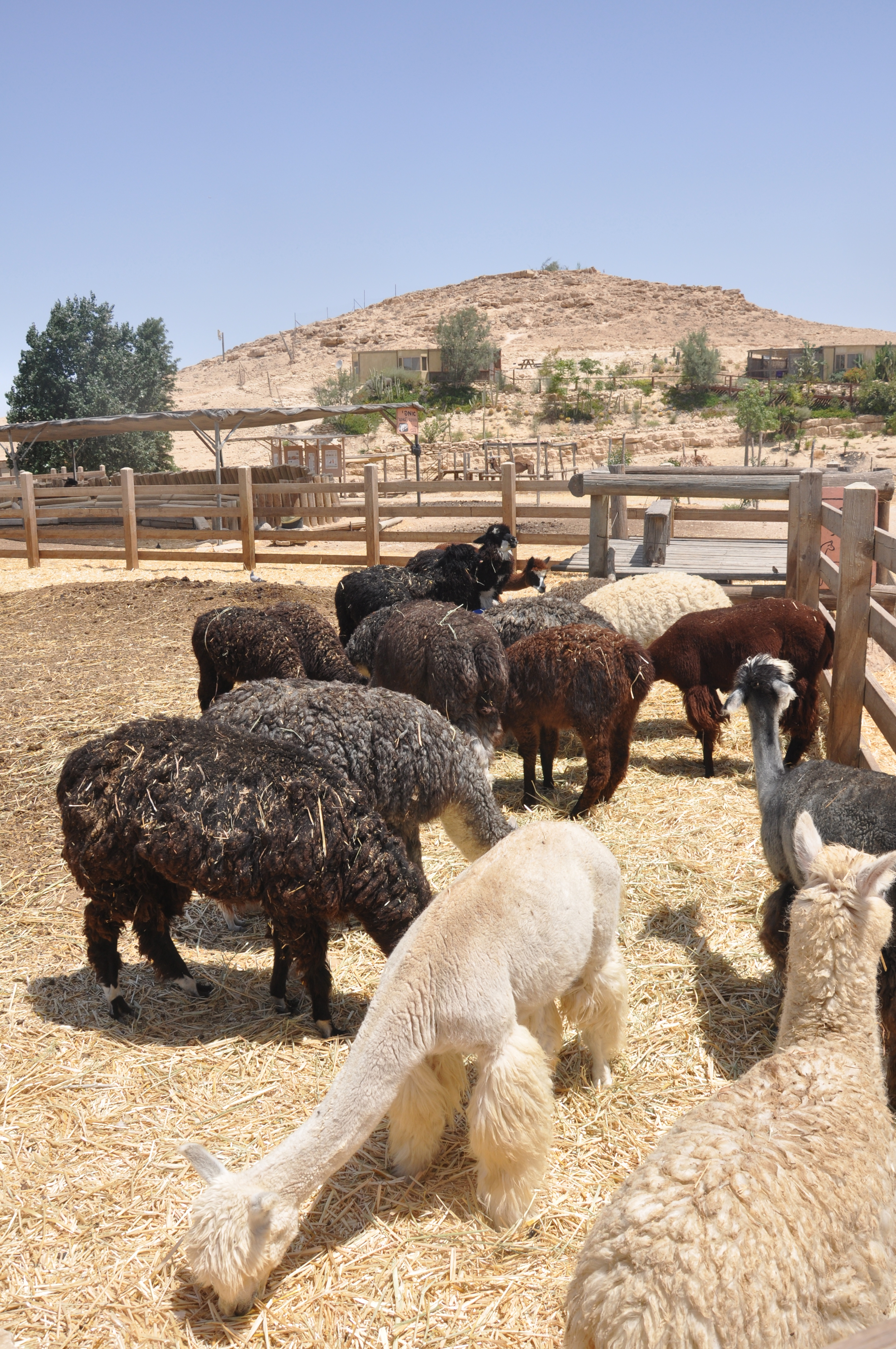
Alpacas at the Alpaca Farm adjacent to Mitzpe Ramon

Nearby Mitzpe Ramon is an Alpaca farm, one of a rare few outside South America.. Its herd of Alpacas and Llamas, which numbers 400, is considered among the largest in the world. While the farm was established as a wool-harvesting enterprise, it has subsequently become a tourist attraction.

== Local government ==
The previous mayor, Flora Shoshan, sister of former Israeli defense minister Amir Peretz and wife of the former mayor, Sami Shoshan, was voted out on 23 October 2013, and replaced by Roni Marom, in a landslide victory for Marom.

== Voting Patterns ==
In the 2026 election, 41 percent of voters in Mitzpe Ramon voted for the parties of the right-wing coalition led by Benjamin Netanyahu, while 40 percent voted for the parties of the center-left coalition led by Gadi Eisenkot and 4 percent voted for the Arab parties. An additional 2 percent voted for the Reservists, and 1.1 percent voted for Amcha Yisrael. Voter turnout increased 25 percent from the 2022 election.

== Music and culture ==
The Mitzpe Ramon Jazz Club hosts musical ensembles on the weekend. On weekdays, it operates as a music school. 'Me'ever', a hostel and event space, is in the artist quarter of Mitzpe Ramon.

== Notable residents ==
- Shira Isakov: domestic abuse activist.

== Gallery ==
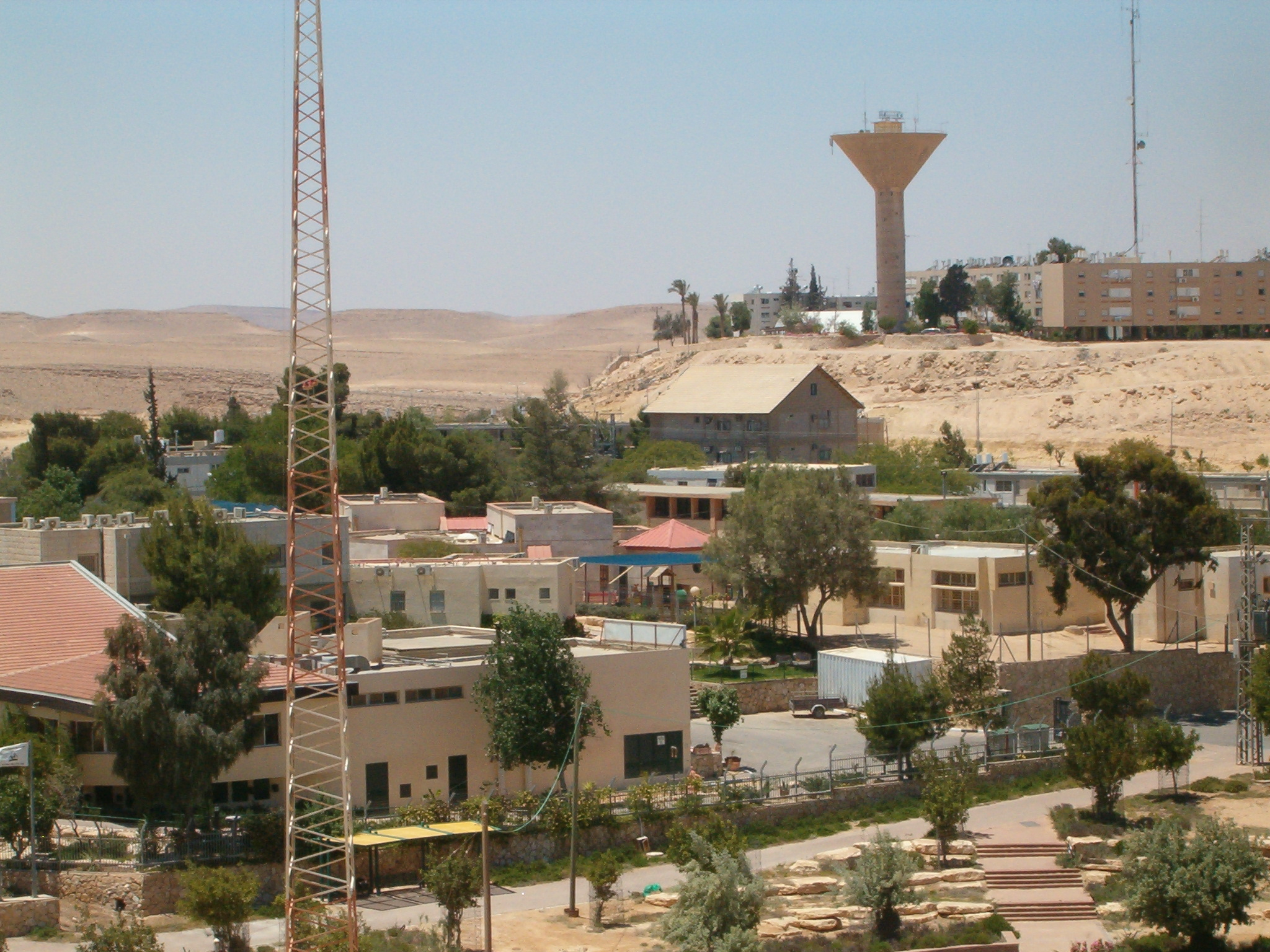
View of the town

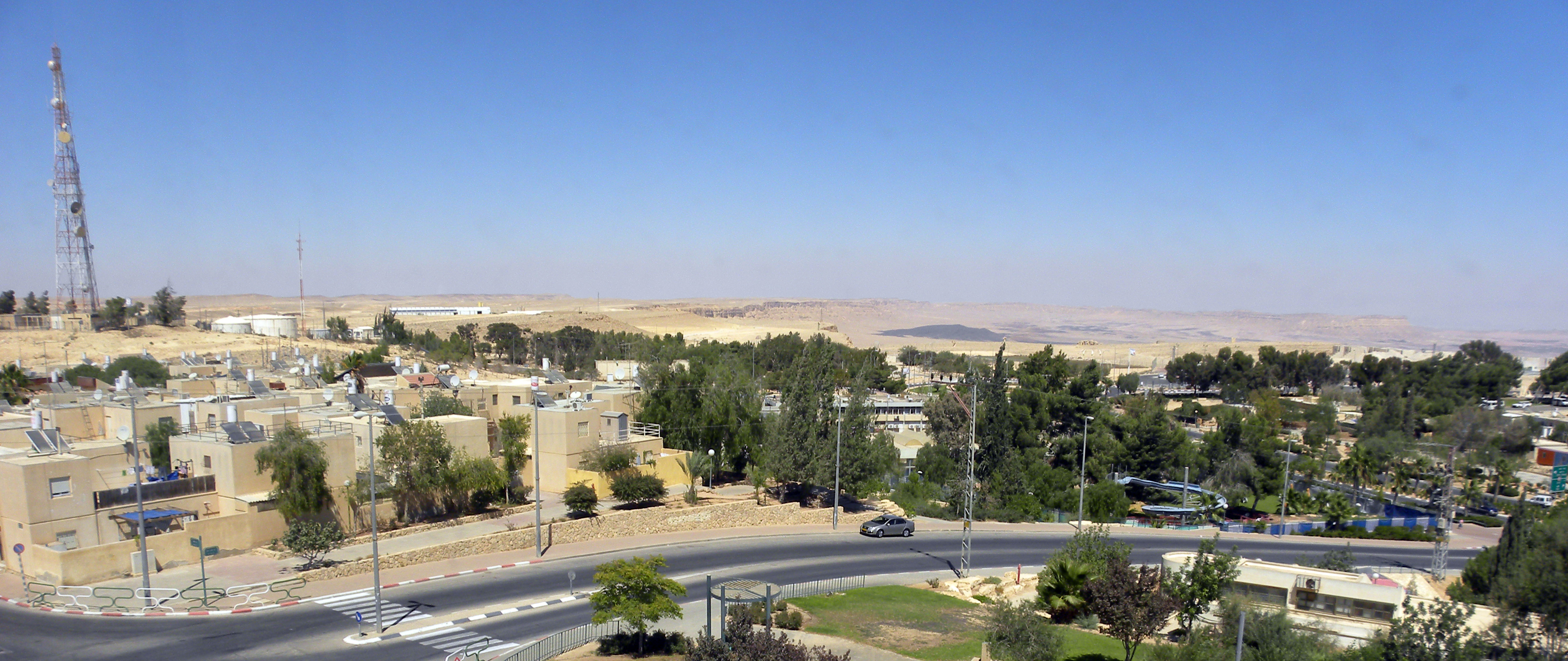
Panorama of Mitzpe Ramon

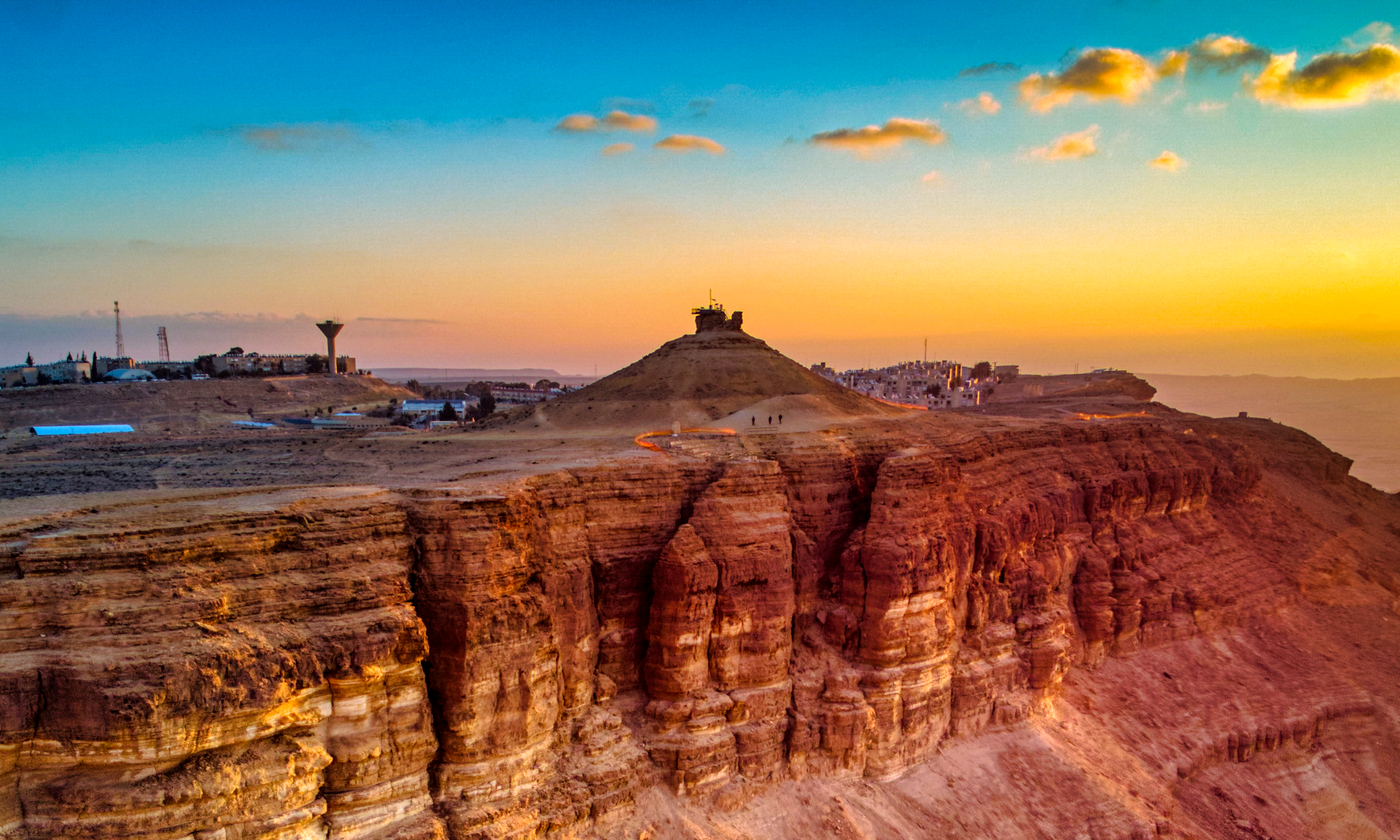
Camel Mountain, Mitzpe Ramon, Makhtesh Ramon

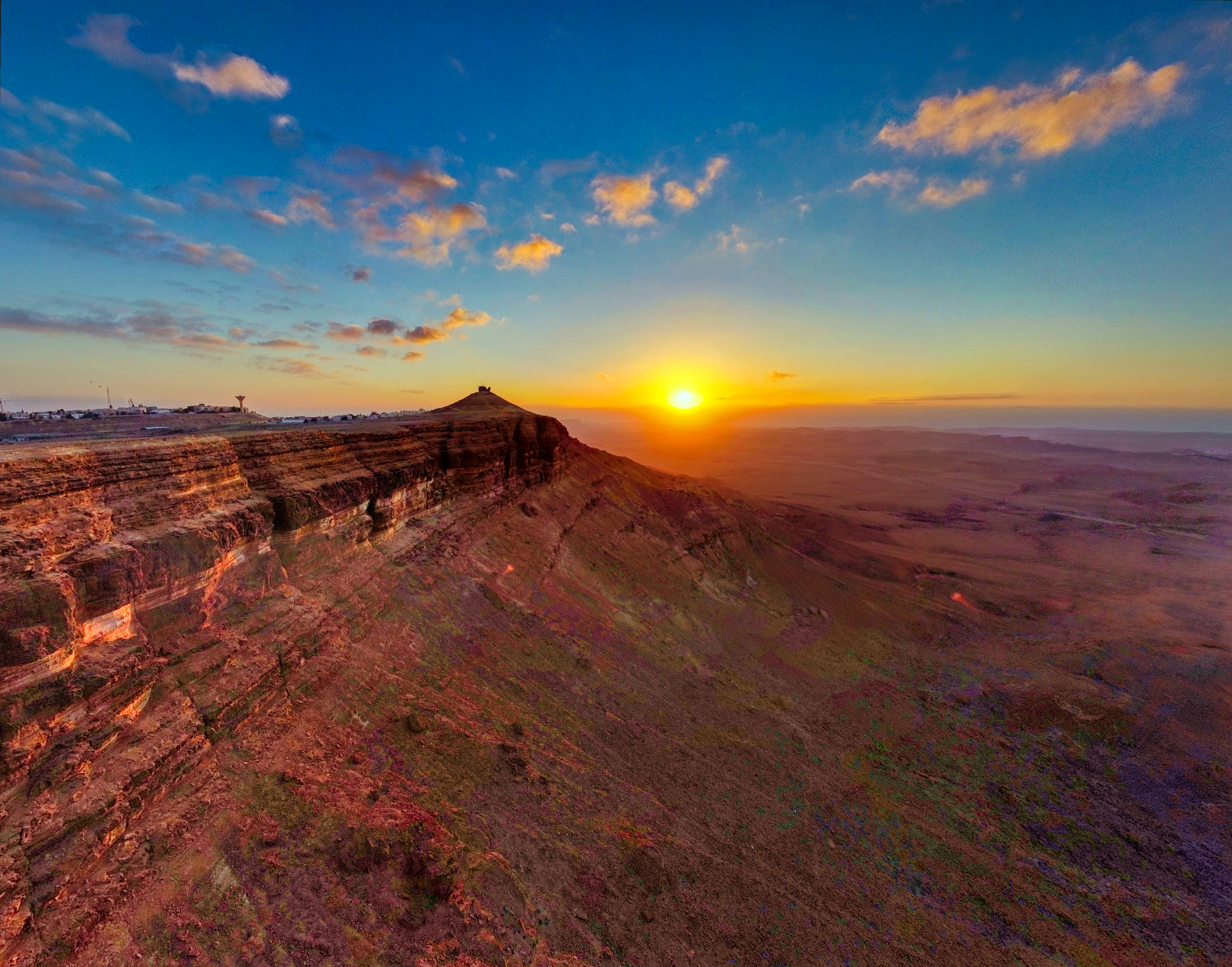
Camel Mountain, Mitzpe Ramon, Makhtesh Ramon

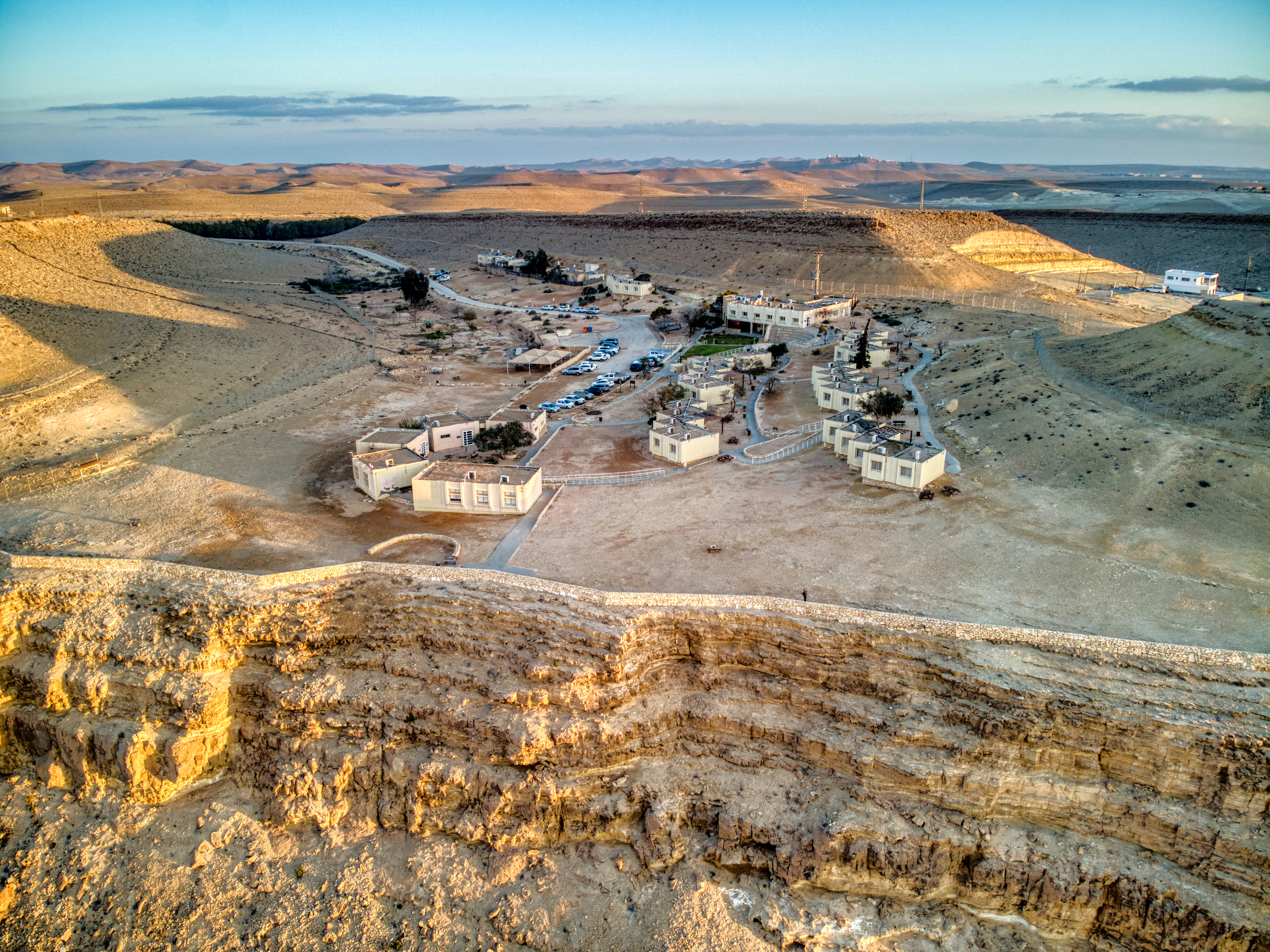
Har Hanegev Field School

== See also ==
- Geography of Israel
- Wildlife of Israel
- Ramon Airbase
- Wise Observatory
