= Route 232 (Israel) =

Route in Israel

Coordinates: 31°17′48″N 34°42′46″E

Route 232
- כביש 232
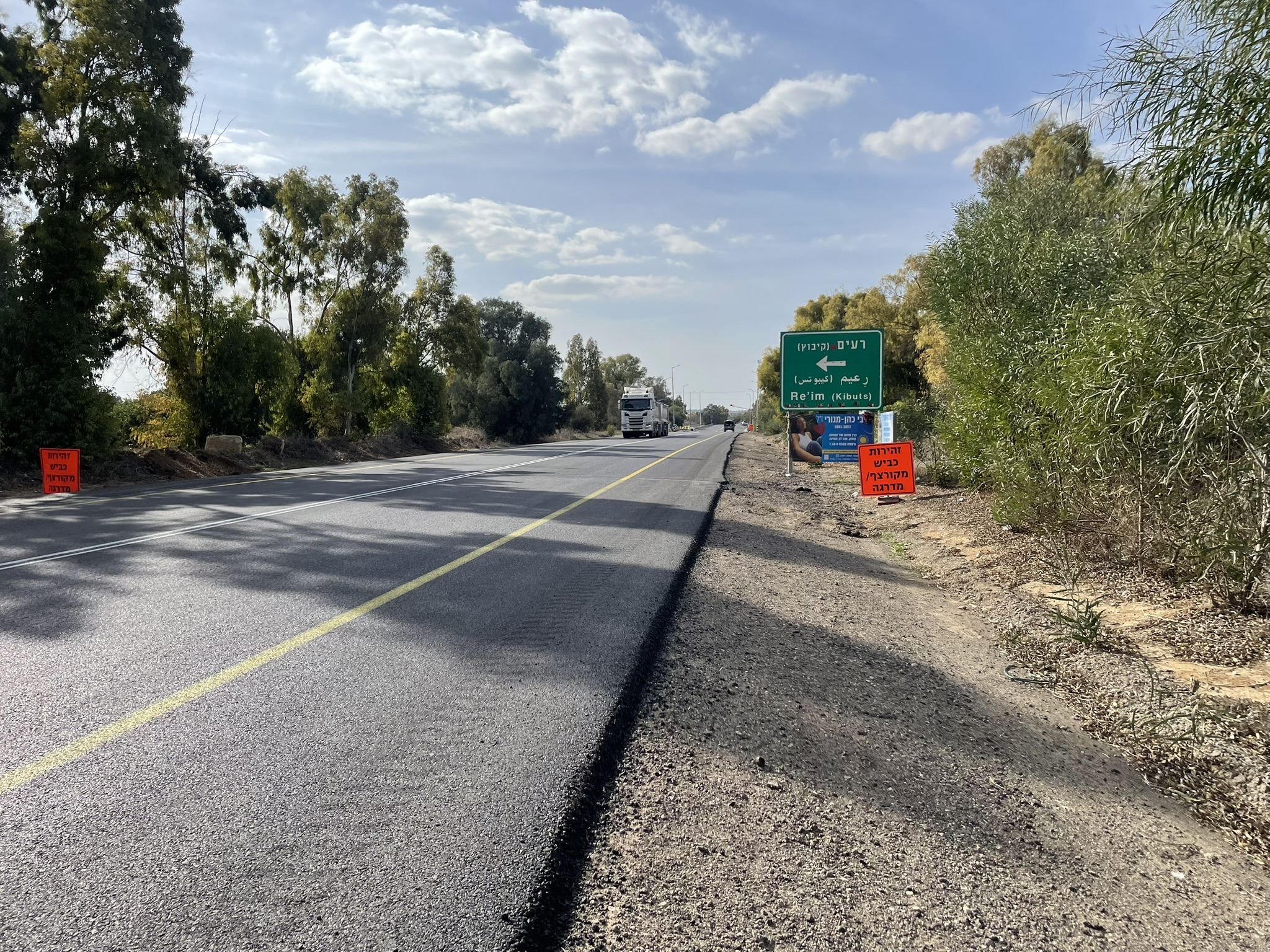
- Route 232 South approaching Re'im Junction

Route information
- Length: 81.4 km (50.6 mi)

Major junctions
- South end: Kerem Shalom border crossing
- North end: Nitzanim

Location
- Country: Israel

Highway system
- Roads in Israel; Highways
← Route 227	→ Route 234

Route 232 is a rural road in southern Israel. It begins at the Kerem Shalom Crossing at the border with the Gaza Strip, and it passes through the Gaza Envelope, near kibbutzim Re'im, Be'eri, and Kfar Aza, where it meets Highway 25. It continues Northeast to meet Highway 4 near Sderot, before turning northward to terminate on the same road north of Ashkelon. Since the October 7 attacks, the road has been given the monicker of "the bloody road (כביש הדמים)" within Israel.

== History ==
The northern part of the road (from Nitzanim to Nir Am area) was paved during the British Mandate. The road was a major axis for the Negev communities and the control of a number of battles during the 1948 Palestine war. The southern part of the road was paved in 1951 to connect the Western Negev communities: Be'eri, Magen, Re'im, Kissufim, Ein HaShlosha, Nirim and Merhavim Regional Council communities on the road. The road continued in being paved up to Route 241 in the south. In 1954-1955, the road was extended to Nir Yitzhak and in 1959 the road from Nir Yitzhak was extended to Kerem Shalom.

After the Six-Day War, the road was paved next to Kerem Shalom Road about 6 miles that connected to the coastal road in Sinai. This road served as the Israeli traffic to Sinai at the end of 1969, following many attacks on Highway 4 in the Gaza Strip to Israeli civilian traffic. As a result, the National Roads Company of Israel expanded the road.

In the mid-1980s, Highway 10 was paved as well as a connection from the road, near Sufa, to the Gaza Strip towards Morag and Gush Katif, (the road section was also called the Kissufim road and was part of Route 242), but its use was relatively little because of its remoteness from the population centers in Israel. In July 1991, the continuation of Route 242 was inaugurated from Highway 4 and most of the traffic to Gush Katif moved to Route 232 and from it to Route 242, especially after the Palestinian Authority was established and the transfer of power in the Gaza Strip. After the closure of the Karni crossing and the Erez crossing, all the trucks bearing goods designed for the Gaza Strip were directed to the Kerem Shalom crossing, which created heavy traffic loads on the road and raised protest by the residents of Hevel Eshkol.

In 2005-2019, 44 people were killed in road accidents. In 2014 the government decided to expand the road to two lanes, in 2019 construction began and 8.5 kilometers were upgraded.

Route 232 played a role in the 2023 Hamas-led attack on Israel. This road provides access to some of the worst affected communities, with Palestinian gunmen ambushing civilian vehicles fleeing along this route.

Dozens of partygoers to the Nova festival, itself adjoining Route 232, ran to bomb shelters along this road, particularly at Re'im and Be'eri, only to have grenades thrown inside to massacre them.

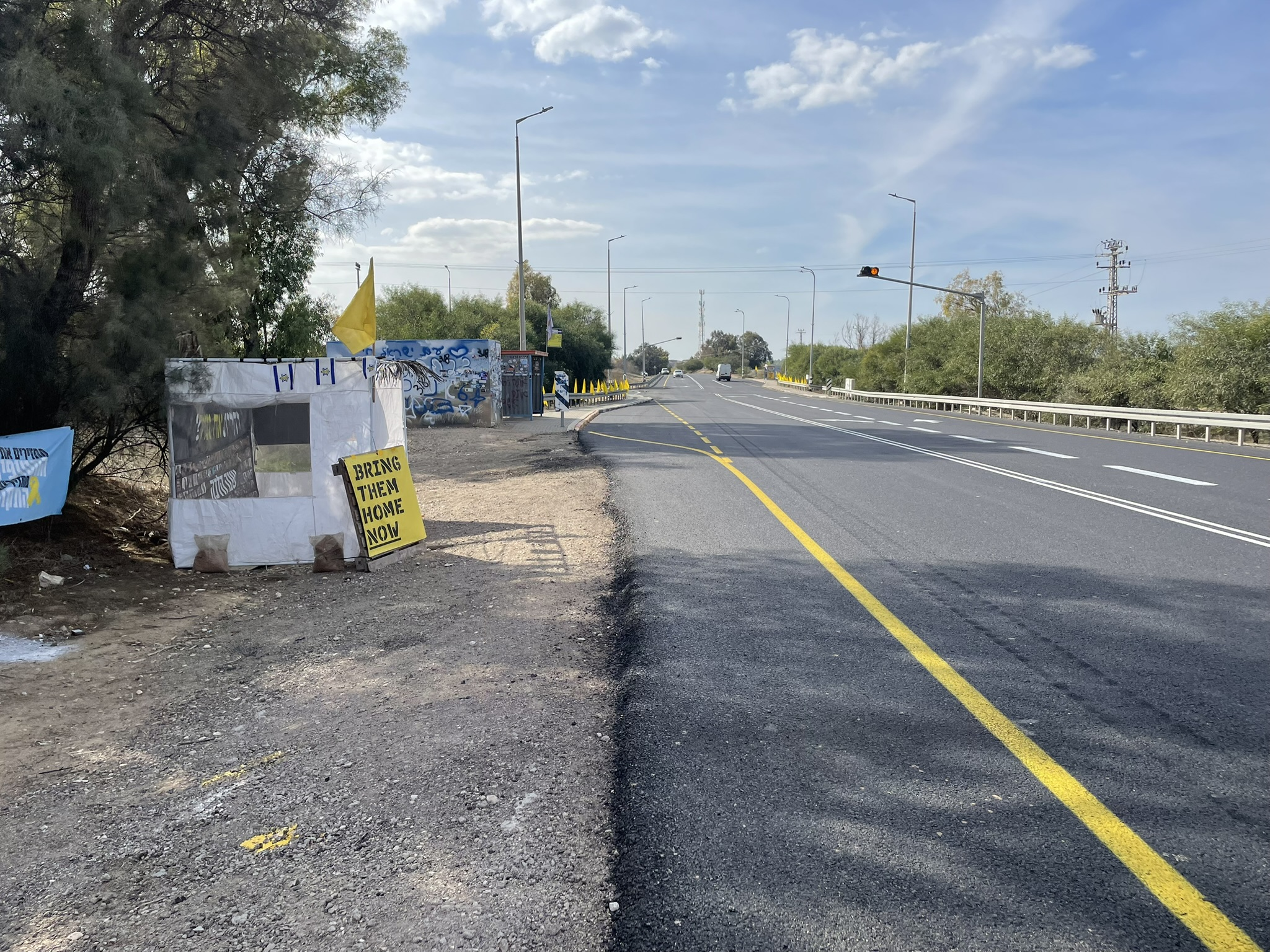
Re'im Junction, eastern side, bomb shelter visible.

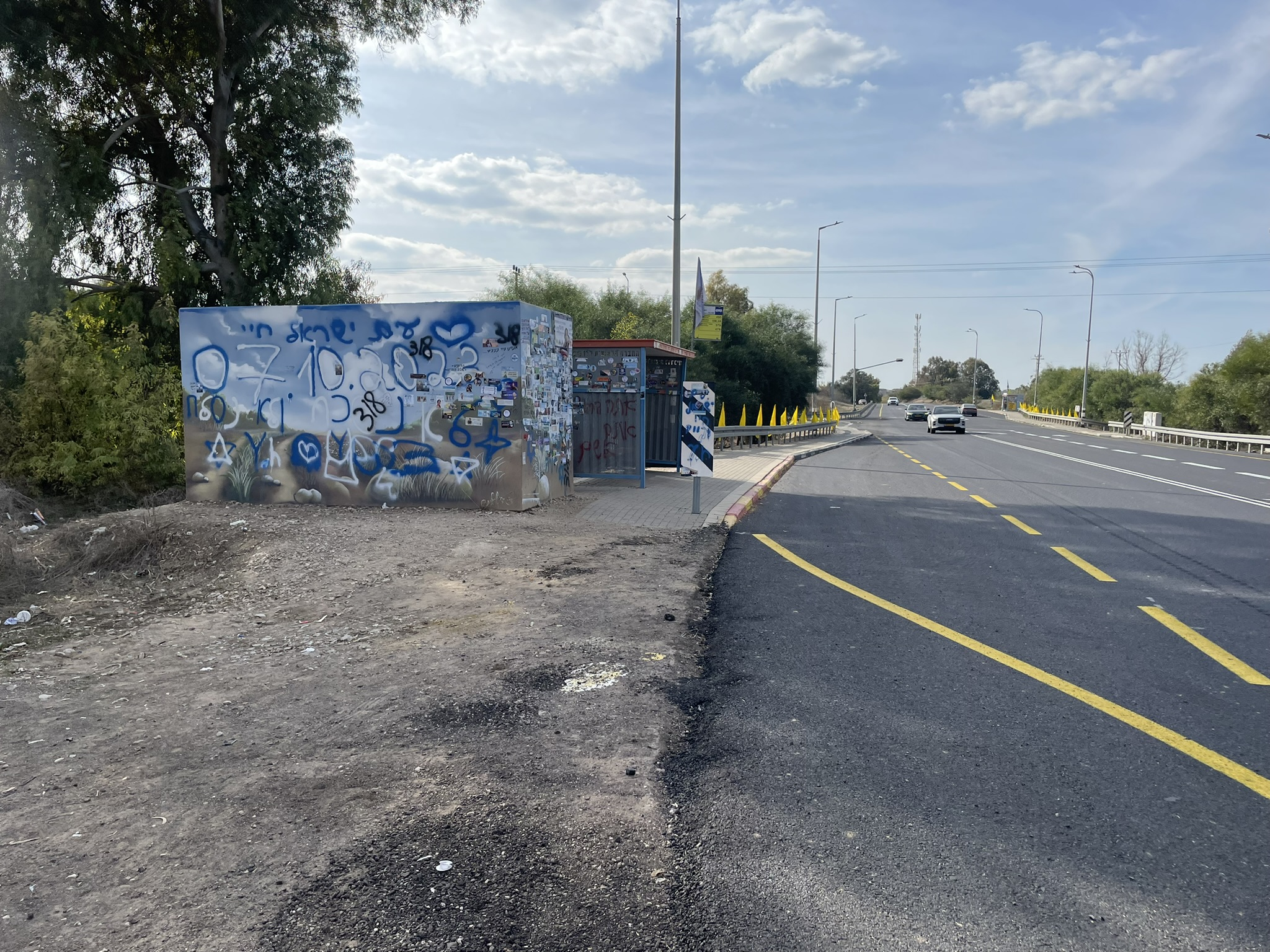
Mural on eastern bomb shelter

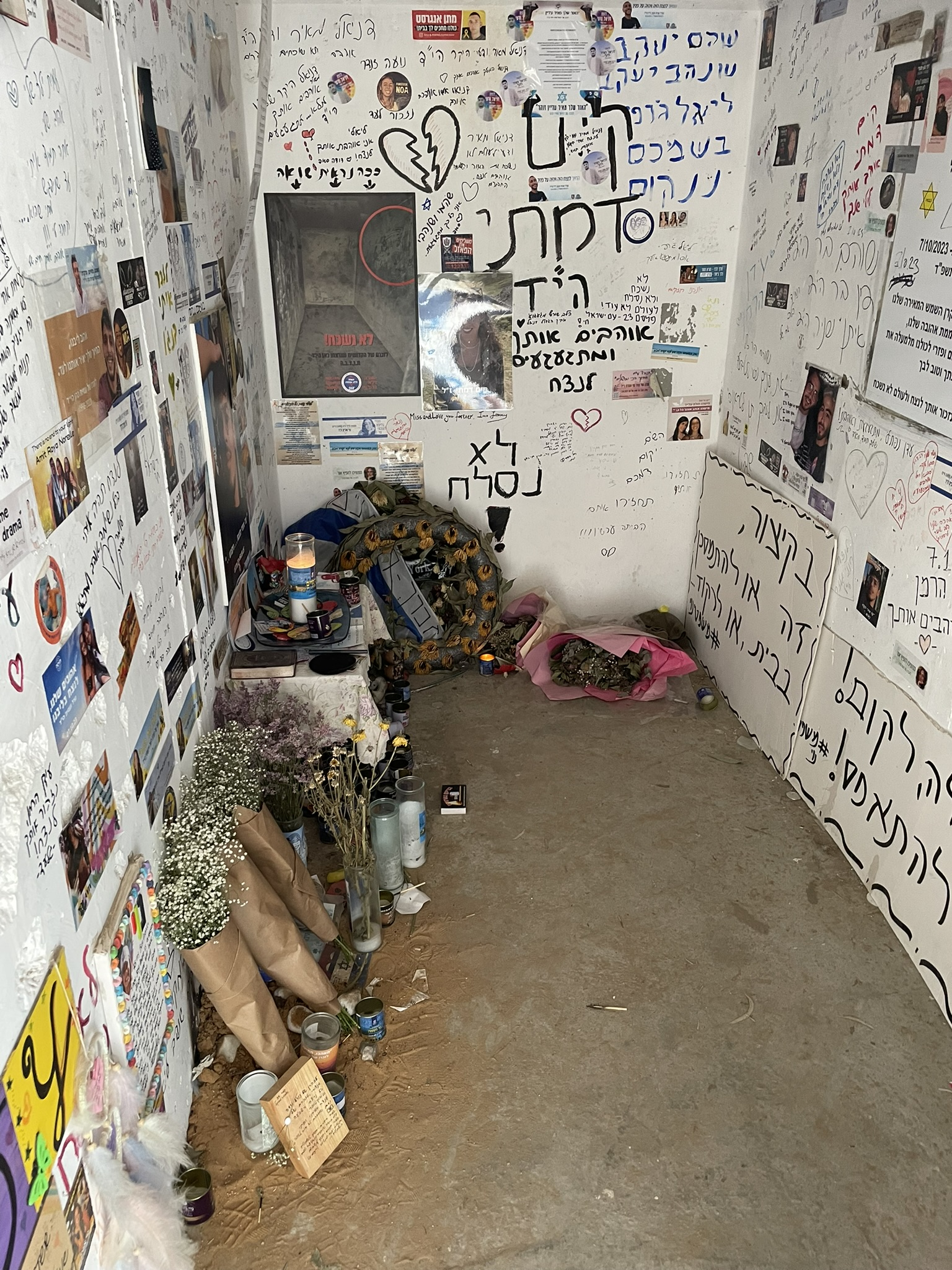
Memorials inside shelter

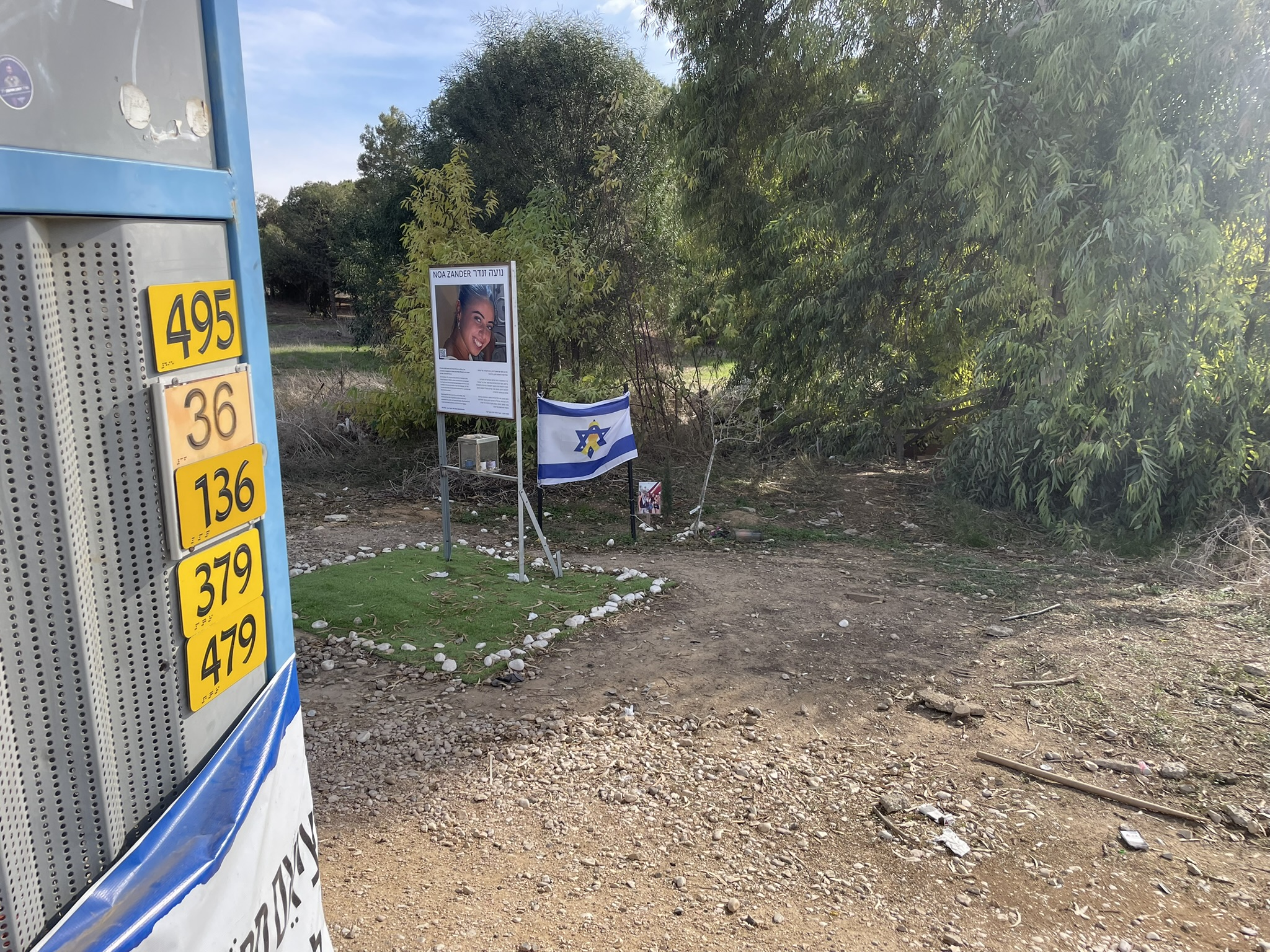
Memorial to Noa Zander, at Re'im Junction bus stop

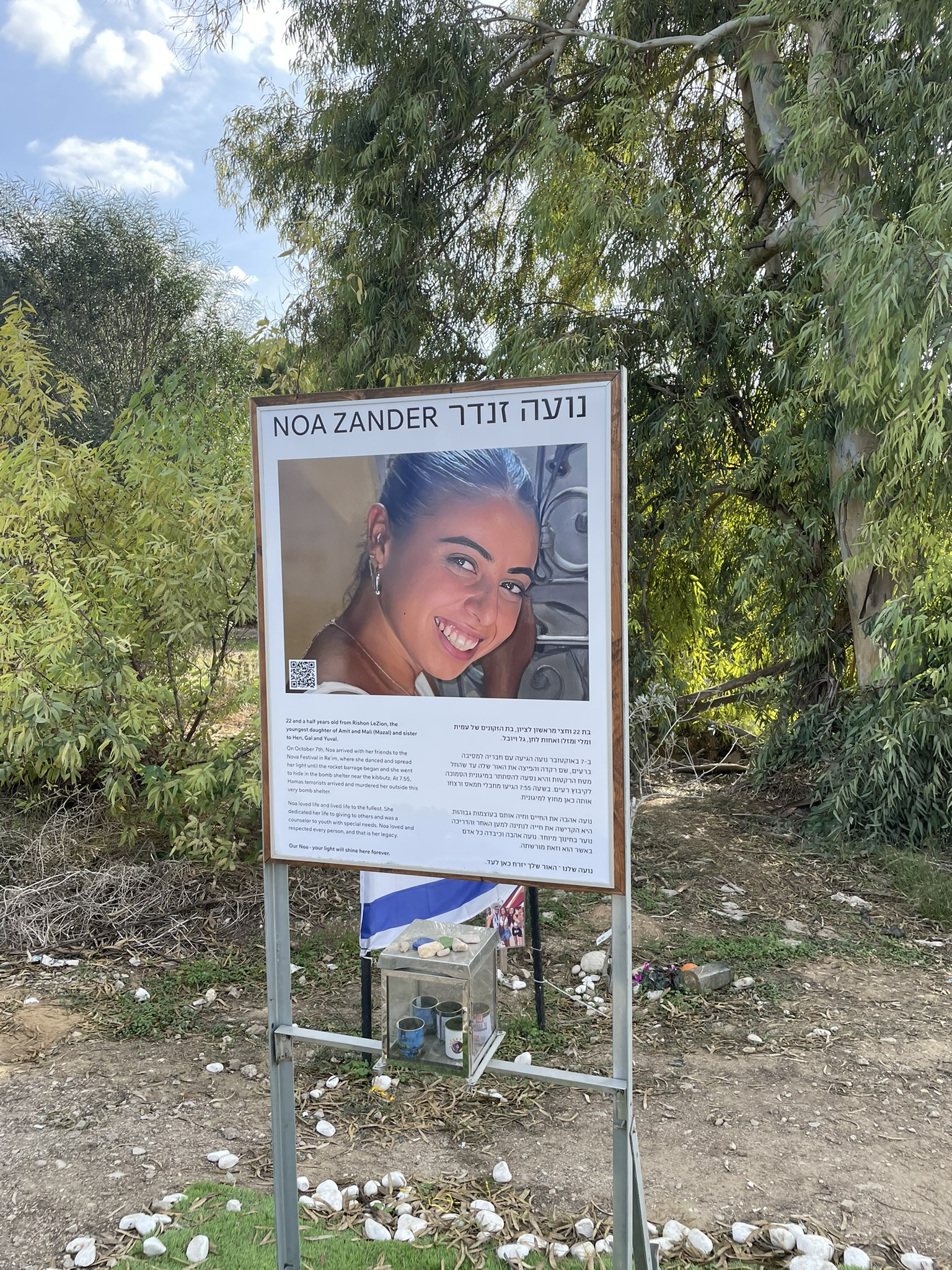
Detail of memorial

== Junctions & Interchanges ==
District	Location	km	mi	Name	Destinations	Notes
Southern	Near Kerem Shalom	0	0.0	צומת ליד כרם שלום (Junction near Kerem Shalom)	Highway 10	Access road to Kerem Shalom Crossing. Highway 10 is currently military use only.
Southern	Kerem Shalom	2.1	1.3	כרם שלום (Kerem Shalom)	Entrance to Kerem Shalom	
Southern	Sdei Avraham	5.5	3.4	צומת אבשלום (Avshalom Junction)	Road 2211	
Southern	Holit	6.5	4.0	צומת חולית (Holit Junction)	Route 240	
Southern	Pri Gan	7.8	4.8	צומת פרי גן (Pri Gan Junction)	Road 2200	
Southern	Nir Yitzhak	8.6	5.3		Entrance to Nir Yitzhak	
Southern	Mivtahim	13.9	8.6	צומת מבטחים (Mivtahim Junction)	Road 2310	
Southern	Ein HaBesor	17	11	צומת גבולות (Gvulot Junction)	Route 222	
Southern	Magen	20	12	צומת מגן (Magen Junction)	Entrance to Magen	
Southern	Magen	22.5	14.0	צומת מעון (Ma'on Junction)	Route 241; Road 2410	
Southern	Re'im	30	19	צומת גמה (Gama Junction)	Route 242	
Southern	Re'im	31	19	צומת רעים (Re'im Junction)	Route 234	
Southern	Be'eri	37.5	23.3	צומת בארי (Be'eri Junction)	Entrance to Be'eri	
Southern	Alumim	40.5	25.2	צומת עלומים (Alumim Junction)	Entrance to Alumim	
Southern	Sa'ad	43	27	צומת סעד (Sa'ad Junction)	Highway 25; Entrance to Sa'ad	
Southern	Sa'ad	43.5	27.0	צומת סעד (Sa'ad Junction)	Highway 25	
Southern	Sa'ad	44.2	27.5		Entrance to Sa'ad	
Southern	Kfar Aza	44.5	27.7	צומת כפר עזה (Kfar Aza Junction)	Entrance to Kfar Aza	
Southern	Mefalsim	49.5	30.8	צומת מפלסים (Mefalsim Junction)	Entrance to Mefalsim	
Southern	Sha'ar HaNegev	52	32	צומת שער הנגב (Sha'ar HaNegev Junction)	Highway 34	
Southern	Sapir Academic College	53.2	33.1		Access road to Sapir Academic College	
Southern	Sderot	54.6	33.9		Menachem Begin Rd.	
Southern	Sderot	55.4	34.4	צומת דורות (Dorot Junction)	Route 334	
Southern	Ibim	55.7	34.6	צומת איבים (Ibim Junction)	Entrance to Ibim	
Southern	Or HaNer	59	37	צומת אור הנר (Or HaNer Junction)	Entrance to Or HaNer	
Southern	Bror Hayil	59.3	36.8	צומת ברור חיל (Bror Hayil Junction)	Entrance to Bror Hayil	
Southern	Heletz	51	32	צומת חלץ (Heletz Junction)	Route 352	
Southern	Kokhav Michael	68.5	42.6		HaTzabar Street	
Southern	Sde Yoav	70.5	43.8	צומת גבעתי (Givati Junction)	Highway 35	
Southern	Hodaya	74.5	46.3	צומת הודיה (Hodaya Junction)	Highway 3	
Southern	Nitzanim	81.4	50.6	צומת אשכולות (Eshkolot Junction)	Highway 4	
1.000 mi = 1.609 km; 1.000 km = 0.621 mi: Closed/former

== See also ==
- List of highways in Israel
