= Garin Tzabar =

Israeli Lone Soldiers program

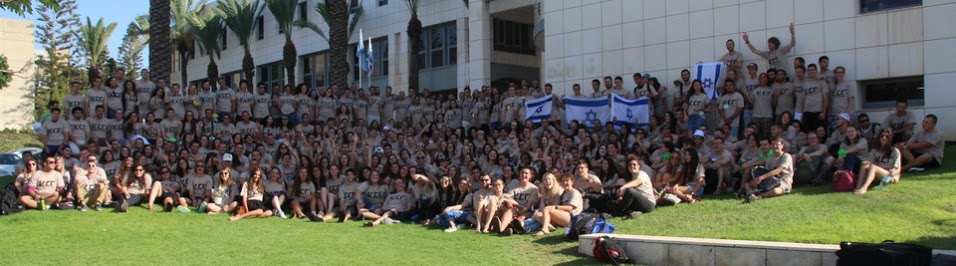
Garin Tzabar members - Summer 2015, Opening ceremony Israel Scouts

Garin Tzabar (Hebrew: גרעין צבר) is a program that facilitates service in the Israel Defense Forces (IDF) and provides a support system for Israelis and Diaspora Jews who do not have parents in Israel. Soldiers who do not have at least one parent living in Israel are called "Lone Soldiers". The Garin Tzabar members are Jewish young adults (ages 18-24, 23 for women) and sons and daughters of Israelis living abroad, who wish to make Israel their home and serve a meaningful service in the IDF as Lone Soldiers. Upon their Aliyah, the group is adopted by an Israel community (Kibbutz or the Absorption Center in Raanana) and live there for three months during which they study Hebrew and navigate the necessary bureaucratic and military processes that are required before their imminent draft. Upon enlistment, participants are required to remain on their respective Kibbutz for at least a year. In addition to Garin Tzabar staff, soldiers and educators from the IDF and teachers from the Ministry of Education assist with the transition.

It is affiliated with the Hebrew Scouts Movement in Israel.

== Etymology ==
In Hebrew, Garin means “core” or “seed”. Aside from its literal use, the word is also used in Israel to refer to a group of people who moved to Israel together. The Hebrew word Tzabar, translated in English as sabra, is used in Israel to mean a native-born Israeli Jew.

== History ==
Garin Tzabar was founded in 1991 and is run by Tzofim Tzabar Olami, a non-profit organization, with the support of the Ministry of Aliyah and Immigrant Absorption, and Nefesh B'Nefesh.

The program is largely funded by Israel's Ministry of Immigrant Absorption, but also receives money from the Jewish Agency for Israel, Ministry of Education (Israel), Ministry of Defense (Israel) and private donors. There are over 400 lone soldiers that are supported by Garin Tzabar every year, and come from all over the world including the United States, Canada, Russia, France, Australia, England, Nigeria, Thailand, Finland, Sweden, Switzerland, Germany, Poland, Spain, Brazil, Italy, Greece, Argentina and several other locations. Each lone soldier belongs to a group (Garin) of approximately 20 soldiers who live together at a kibbutz and experience their military service together as a social unit of mutual support and camaraderie. It is the largest IDF immigrant program in Israel, partnered with the Israel Ministry of Immigrant Absorption, with more than 2,500 soldiers since inception.

== Program ==
The Preparation Process

In this initial stage, the group meets for preparation seminars, which are built to provide a reflective and selective environment. Different aspects pertaining to the move to Israel are discussed and reflected upon, including study of the cultural, political and social characteristics of Israel and a thorough introduction to the IDF and its social role in Israeli society. Each individual is encouraged to undergo a personal maturing process that will be needed to move to Israel and joining the IDF.

Pre-Ulpan

(Mandatory to those with a low level of Hebrew, available in the summer session only)

A month and a half of extensive Hebrew Ulpan studies in the Garin Tzabar Village in Ra'anana. The participants come from all around the world, and are accompanied by social counselors. In the afternoons, there are social activities and volunteering.

The Absorption Process in Israel

Upon arrival in Israel, members of each Garin are placed on a hosting kibbutz. The first three months prior to basic training include:

- Teaching of the Hebrew language (under Ulpan)
- Pre-draft logistics such as a physical exam, mental-psychological fitness testing, and an interview with the IDF
- Acclimation to History of Israel geography, and culture.
- Trips throughout Israel
- Adoption of host families

Military Service in the IDF

Upon joining the army, each Garin member follows their individual path within the IDF. The Garin continues to exist as a support system and members meet in the Garin over the weekends and on time off from the army. The Garin staff, both from the adoptive community and the Israel Scouts, continues to work with the Garin members throughout their army service. Additional seminars and programs are designed and implemented to maintain the framework of the Garin.

Alumni

Each Garin Tzabar member who finishes their army service joins our extensive alumni network, with over 2,500 members. The main goals of the alumni network are: social and professional networking, personal development and cooperation with current Garin Tzabar members.

== Kibbutzim ==
Garin Tzabar has held groups of lone soldiers (Garinim) in over 30 Kibbutzim throughout Israel, and two Garin Villages (Ra'anana and Ibim). The current Kibbutzim with Garin’s (groups) of lone soldiers include Ein Tzurim, Kibbutz Yehiam, Nir Oz, Ein HaShlosha, Alumim, Lahav, Kissufim, Afikim, Nir Yitzhak, Moledet, Nir Etzion, Magen, Sde Boker, Dvir, Beit Rimon, Lavi, Ginegar, Hanita, Beit Zera, Ein Dor, Neve Eitan, Maoz Haim, Kvutzat Yavne, Be'erot Yitzhak, Kvutzat Kinneret, Geva, Regba, Sha'ar HaGolan, and Sa'ad.

== See also ==
- Mahal
- Sar-El
