= Route 222 (Israel) =

Route in southern Israel

Route 222
- כביש 222

Route information
- Length: 46 km (29 mi)

Major junctions
- South end: Mash'abim Junction
- North end: Gvulot Junction

Location
- Country: Israel

Highway system
- Roads in Israel; Highways
← Route 211	→ Route 224

Route 222 is a regional arterial road in the Negev that connects the Mash'abim Junction (Highway 40) within the Ramat Negev Regional Council and the Gvulot Junction (Route 232) within the Eshkol Regional Council. The length of the road is 46 km (29 mi).

== History ==
The construction of the road began in 1951, to connect Tze'elim, Gvulot, and Mivtahim to road 232.

The section of the road between the resource intersection (Bir 'Asluj) and Kibbutz Revivim was paved in 1953 after a dirt road ran through the place for 10 years of the kibbutz's existence.

The section of the road between Revivim and Kibbutz Tze'elim was paved as a temporary road for the purpose of laying a water pipe from Tze'elim to Revivim during the laying of the Yarkon-Negev water line, and therefore its quality was poor and it was blocked every time more than a few millimeters of rain fell. The road was re-paved in 1971. One of the reasons for the construction of the road was the need for the Revivim children to go to a school located in Kibbutz Magen on a long road that passed through Be'er Sheva.

The section of the road between Tze'elim and Kibbutz Gvulot was opened to traffic in November 1964.

The section of the road between Kibbutz Gvulot and Tzomet Gvulot was opened to traffic in February 1959.

== Junctions (South to North) ==
District	Location	km	mi	Name	Destinations	Notes
Southern	Mashabei Sadeh	0	0.0	צומת משאבים (Mash'abim Junction)	Highway 40	
Southern	Be'er Mash'abim	2	1.2	צומת ביר עסלוג' (Bir 'Asluj Junction)		
Southern	Revivim	7.5	4.7	צומת רביבים (Revivim Junction)	Entrance to Revivim	
Southern	Retamim	9	5.6	צומת רתמים (Retamim Junction)	Entrance to Retamim	
Southern	Tze'elim	33	21		Entrance to Tze'elim	
Southern	Tze'elim	34	21	צומת צאלים (Tze'elim Junction)	Route 234	
Southern	Gvulot	39	24		Entrance to Gvulot	
Southern	Ein HaBesor	46	29	צומת גבולות (Gvulot Junction)	Route 232	
1.000 mi = 1.609 km; 1.000 km = 0.621 mi

== See also ==
- List of highways in Israel
