= Route 234 (Israel) =

Route in southern Israel

Route 234
- כביש 234
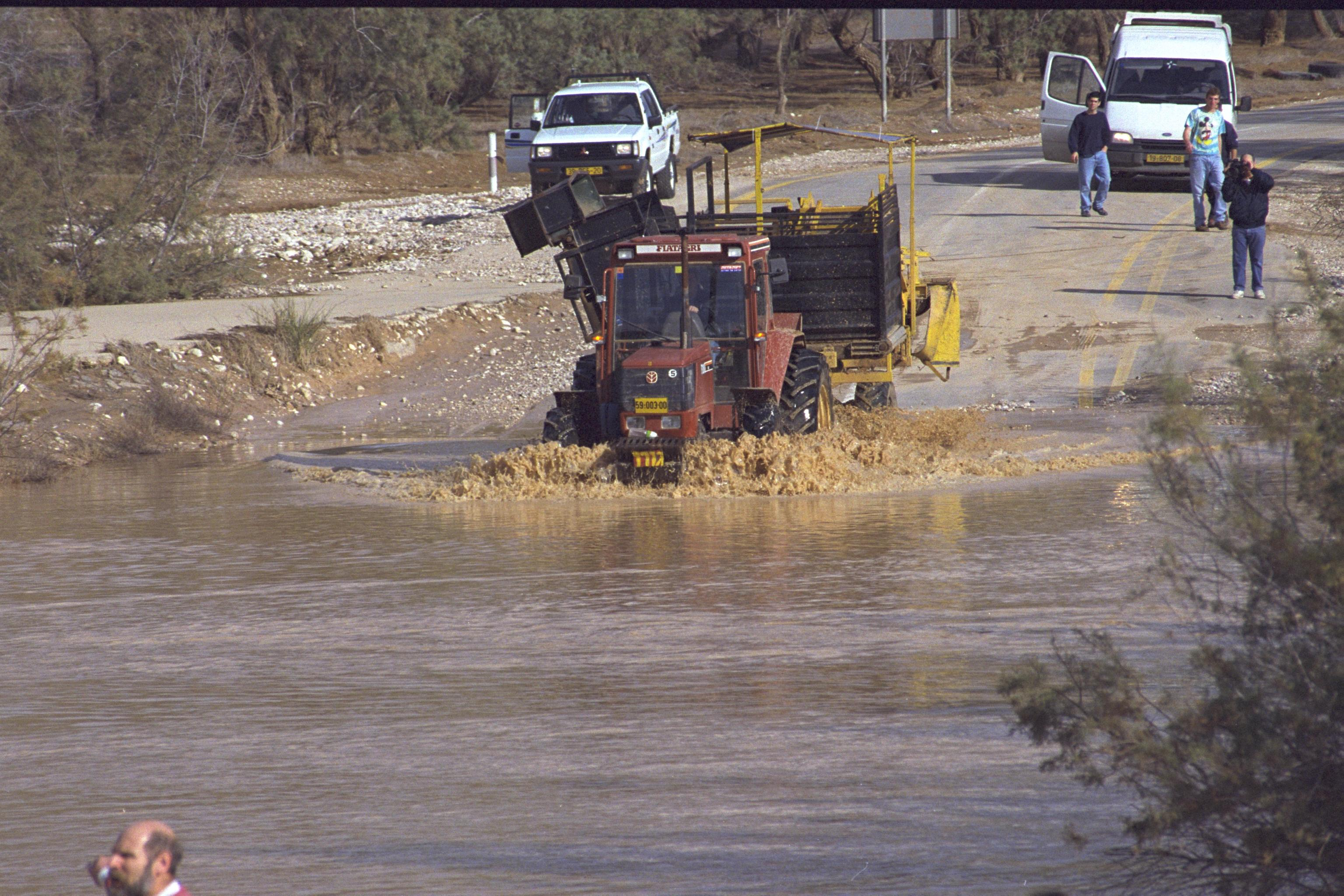
- A tractor attempts to cross the submerged Tze'elim Bridge after storms flooded the Negev.

Route information
- Length: 23.5 km (14.6 mi)

Major junctions
- South end: Tze'elim Junction
- North end: Re'im Junction

Location
- Country: Israel

Highway system
- Roads in Israel; Highways
← Route 232	→ Route 240

Route 234 is a regional highway in the western part of the northern Negev leading from the Tze'elim junction to the Re'im junction in the Gaza Envelope. Its length is about 23.5 km (14.6 mi).

== History ==
The section between Tze'elim and Urim was paved in the late 1950s. The Irish bridge that was paved in the channel of Nahal HaBesor, near the Tze'elim junction, was frequently flooded in winter floods and the blocking of the road by the flooding led to the disconnection of Tze'elim.

About a kilometre long, the short section between Urim and the Urim junction was paved only towards the end of the 1990s. (Note: Until the construction of this section, the road from Route 241 to Urim and Tze'elim passed from an intersection located about 2 km east of the current Urim intersection. Today, this intersection is closed to traffic.)

The section between the Urim junction and the Ra'im junction was paved in the 1970s and is sometimes referred to as the "Tal Or Road" because of the "Tal Or" agricultural farm located halfway along this section of road. This road was paved to allow the residents of the Eshkol Regional Council to move towards Be'er Sheva while Nahal HaBesor flooded Route 241 near the Eshkol National Park. It is true that in 1962 a Bailey bridge, nicknamed "Abraham's Bridge", was built in its place, but this bridge was also destroyed several times in severe floods and therefore Route 234 was paved as a bypass road.

== Junctions (South to North) ==
District	Location	km	mi	Name	Destinations	Notes
Southern	Tze'elim	0	0.0	צומת צאלים (Tze'elim Junction)	Route 222	
Southern	Urim	11.5	7.1		Road 2333	
Southern	Urim	13	8.1	צומת אורים (Urim Junction)	Route 241	
Southern	Re'im	23.5	14.6	צומת רעים (Re'im Junction)	Route 232	
1.000 mi = 1.609 km; 1.000 km = 0.621 mi

== See also ==
- List of highways in Israel
