= Eshkol National Park =

National park in Israel

- גן לאומי אשכול
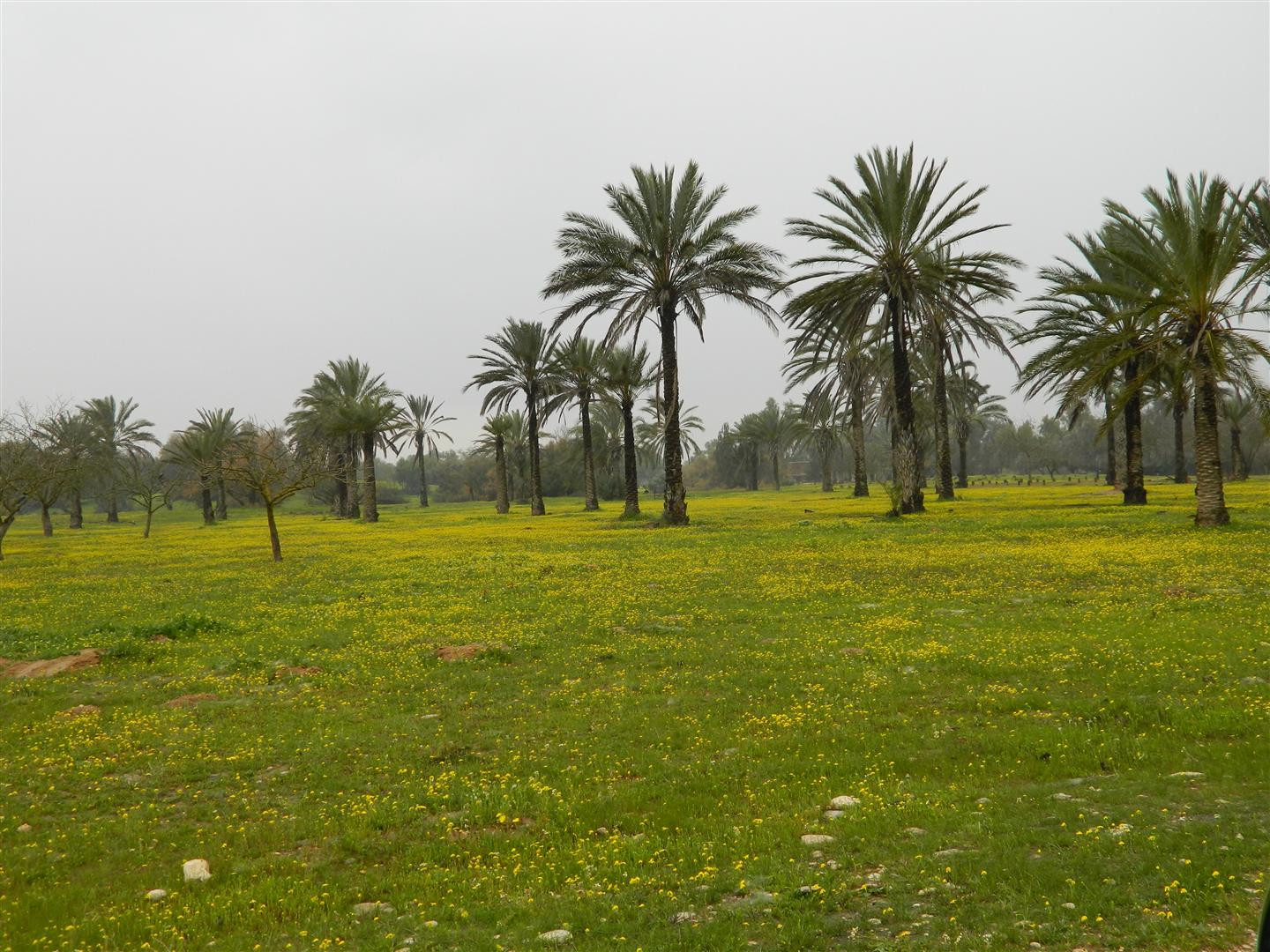
- Blooming flowers & palm trees in the park

- Location within Israel
- Location: Southern District, Israel
- Coordinates: 31°18′29.05″N 34°29′22.19″E
- Website: Eshkol National Park

Eshkol National Park (Hebrew: גן לאומי אשכול) is a national park located in Northern Negev, Israel, near Gaza.

== History ==
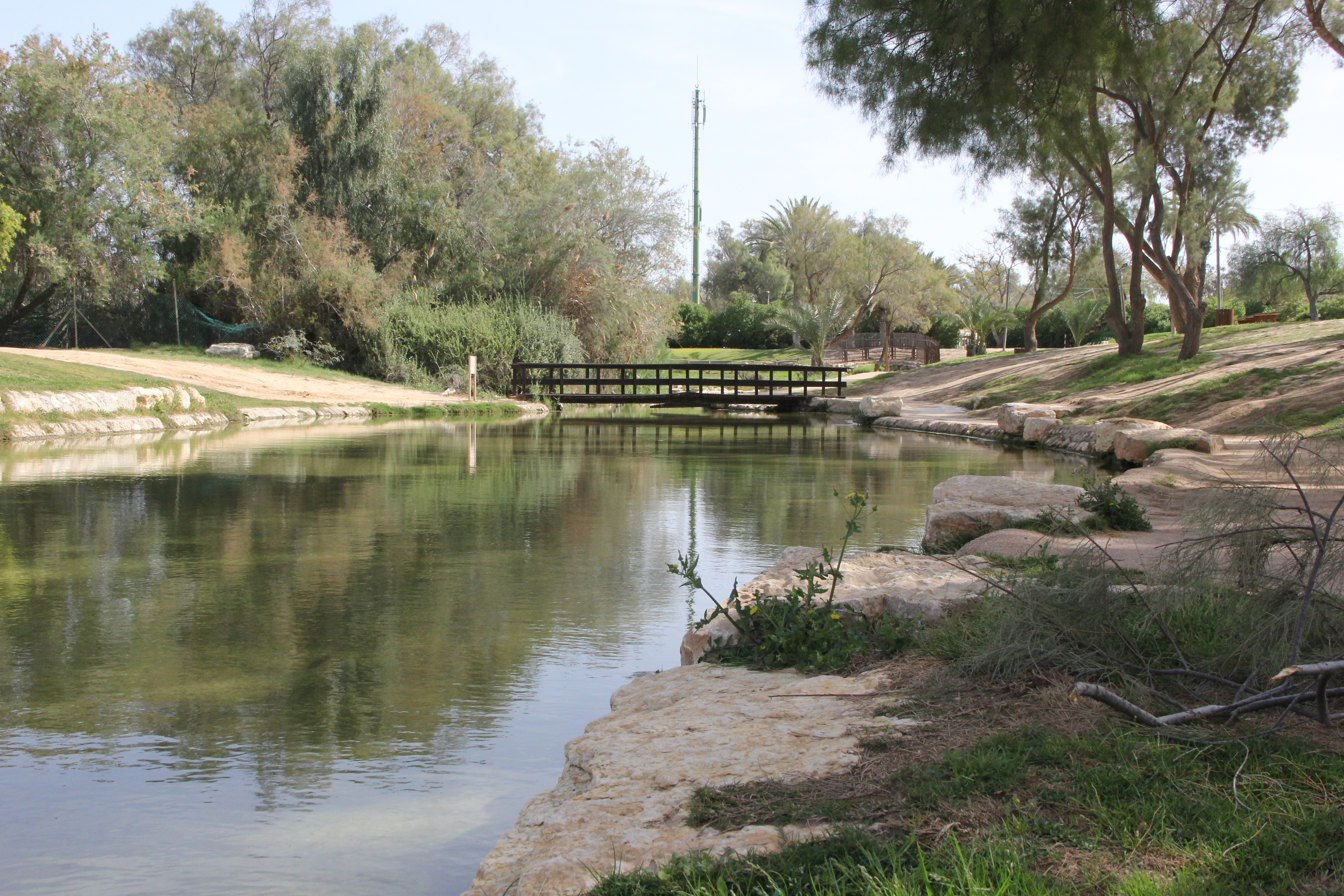
Ein Habesor spring

The 875-acre (3,540-dunam) park offers lawns and shaded picnic areas and has at its centre the largest spring in the Besor basin, known in Hebrew as Ein HaBesor and in Arabic as Ein Shalala. The spring taps the near-surface aquifer, which is fed by the runoff of winter rains.

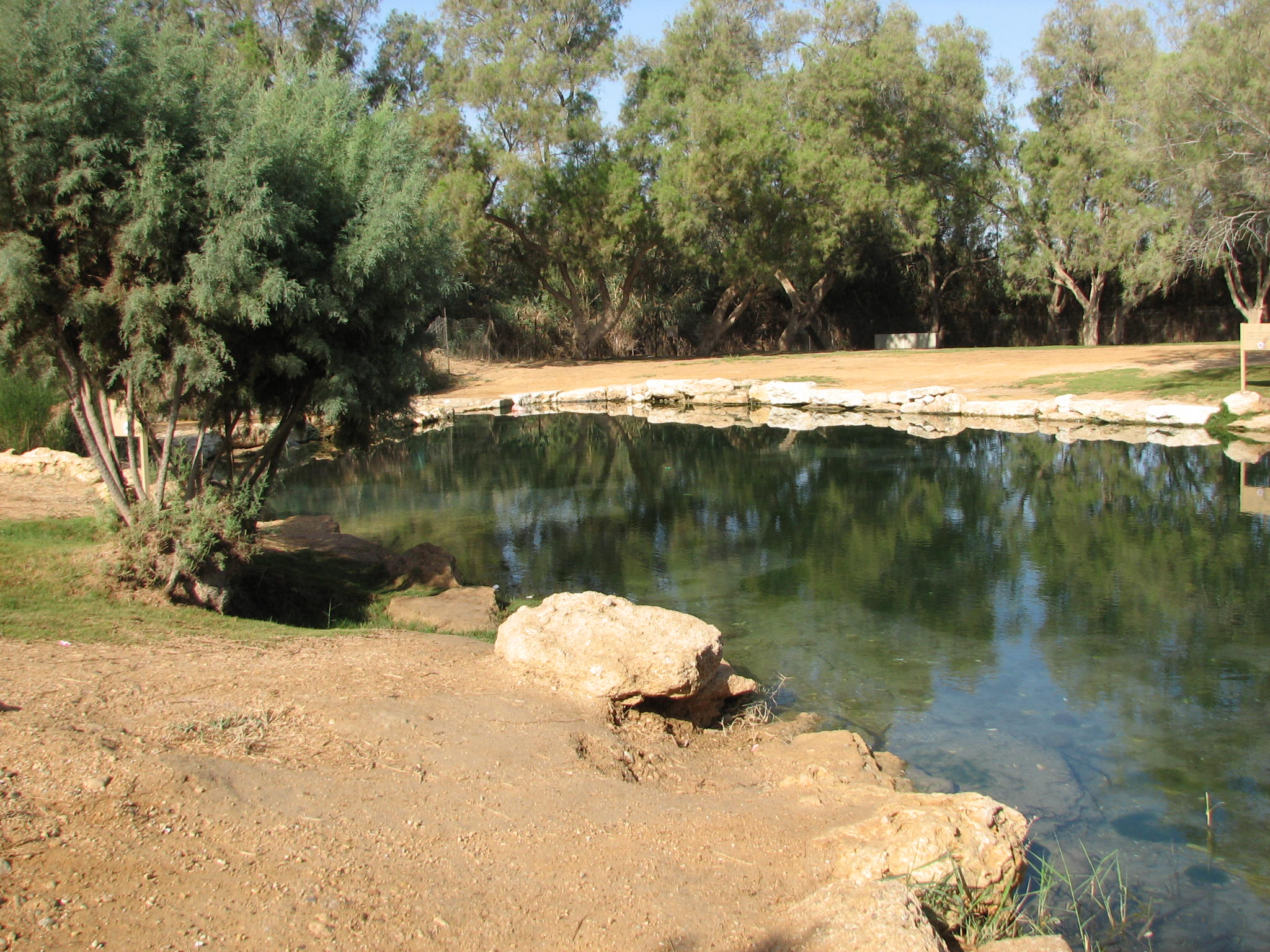
One of the open springs at Ein Habsor.

East of the springs, the mound of Khirbet Shalala dominates the landscape. At Shalala ANZAC troops discovered during the World War I Second Battle of Gaza an elaborate floor mosaic depicting a variety of animals, part of the ruins of a Byzantine church. The mosaic is now displayed in the Australian War Memorial in Canberra. Shalala is located some 3 km northeast, and across the Besor valley from the biblical archaeological site of Tell el-Far'ah (South).

Tell el-Far'ah (South) where human-like, anthropoid coffins were discovered in the mound. (Egyptian influence) The duration of the mound's existence was about 2000 years from the Early Bronze Age to the Roman Empire period. At the foot of the hill on the banks of the stream, the Romans built a supporting wall to prevent the hill from being eroded by the stream. At the bend of the stream near the palm trees, there is a water well from the gravel aquifer, Ein Sharuhen. At the foot of the hill runs a historic road from Beer Sheva to Rafah. The excavations in the mound were done by Flinders Petri.

== See also ==
- Tourism in Israel
- Darom Adom, Israel.
- Israel Museum, Jerusalem.
