= Re'im =

Kibbutz in southern Israel

Re'im: רֵעִים (Hebrew)
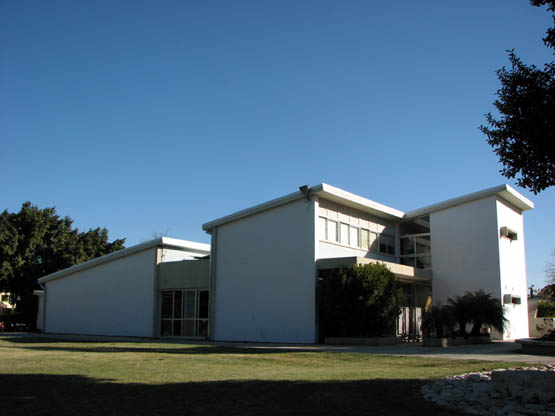
- The dining room was designed by Hanan Havron, a kibbutz member
- Etymology: Friends
- Location within Northwest Negev region of Israel Location within Israel
- Coordinates: 31°23′10″N 34°27′37″E
- Country: Israel
- District: Southern
- Subdistrict: Beersheba
- Council: Eshkol
- Affiliation: Kibbutz Movement
- Founded: 1949
- Founder: Scouts Federation and former Palmach members
- Population (2024): 479
- Website: www.reim.org.il

Re'im (Hebrew: רֵעִים, lit. 'Friends') is a secular kibbutz in southern Israel, and one of the Gaza vicinity villages. Located at the confluence of Besor Stream and Gerar Stream in the north-western Negev desert, it falls under the jurisdiction of Eshkol Regional Council. In 2024, it had a population of 479.

In 2008, Kibbutz Re'im launched a solar power project, becoming the first community in Israel—and possibly the world—fully powered by solar energy for domestic use. The project was estimated to cost ₪60–100 million, with expected returns within 10 years. Profits and costs were to be shared equally between the kibbutz and the Solar company, with surplus electricity sold to the Israel Electric Company.

Re'im was founded in 1949 by members of the Israel Boy and Girl Scouts Federation who were demobilized from the Palmach. The kibbutz was designed by the architect Hanan Havron. The building, which was used by the Havron for decades as his office, is today the kibbutz's heritage building, with a display of the history of the place.

== Geography ==
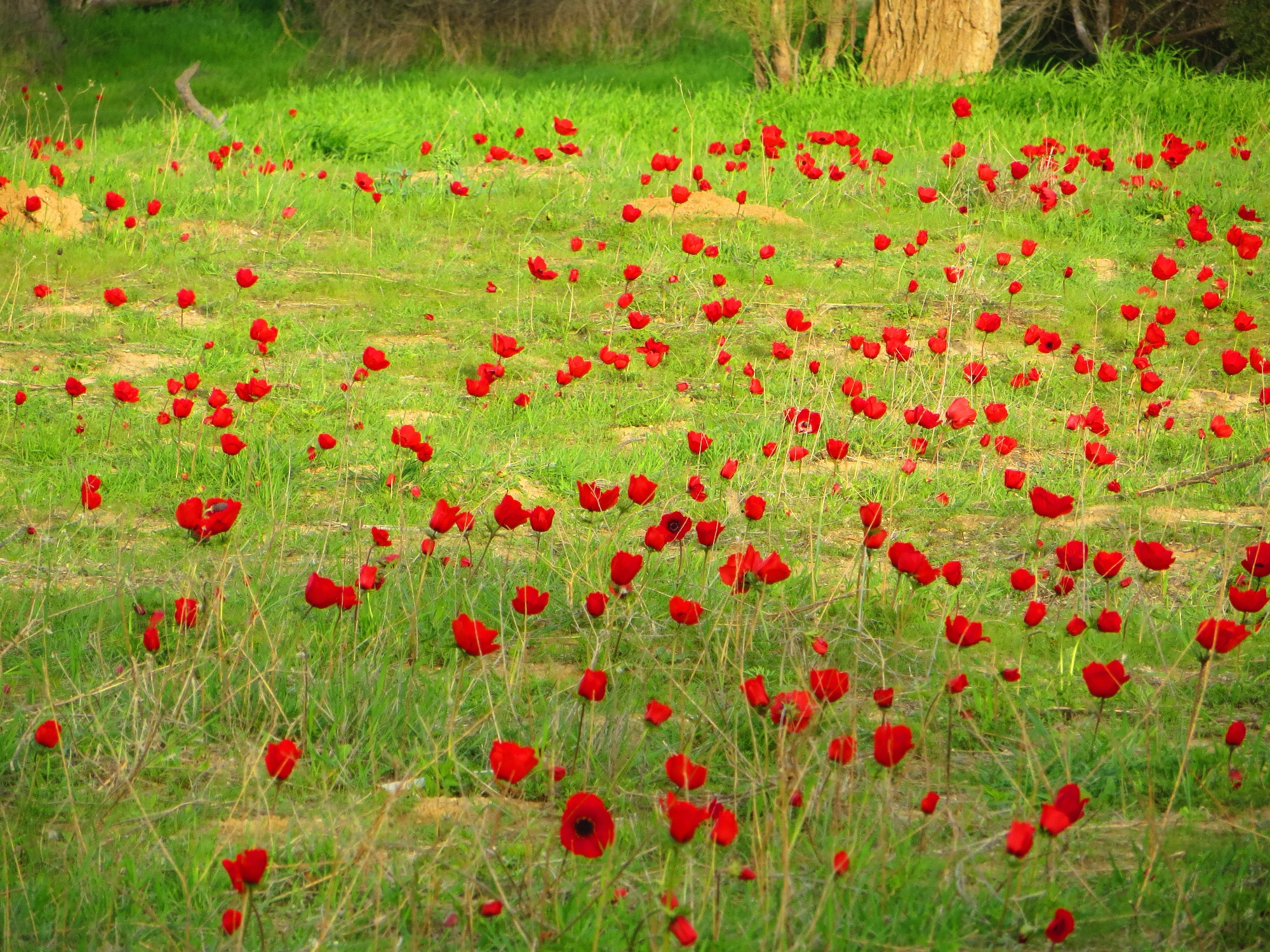
Anemone coronaria near Re'im

Re'im is located between roads 232 and 234 in the western Negev, next to the Re'im Junction and Gama Junction. The ruins of ancient Gama (Tell Jemmeh) are located to the west of the kibbutz. West of Re'im is the kibbutz Kissufim, and north is Be'eri. Re'im's elevation is 50 m (160 ft) above sea level, and the Besor Stream passes through its territory.

== History ==
The kibbutz was established in 1949 by former Palmach members with the provisional name HaTzofim Vav (lit. 'Scouts F'). It was then named Tel Re'im (Hebrew: תל רעים, lit. 'Hill of Friends') after the Arabic translation of the nearby archaeological site of Tell Jemmeh. It was eventually renamed Re'im in memory of members of the Gar'in who were killed in the 1948 Arab–Israeli War. The name, meaning 'friends', was taken from the Book of Proverbs (18:24) to symbolize them.

The kibbutz was planned by the architect Hanan Habaron, one of the founders of the kibbutz and a member until his death in 2002. The ascetic style was described as a visual expression of Habaron's social and architectural worldviews. Asaf Kashtan, an Israeli architect who wrote a book about Habaron, said that in recent years, Habaron's style fell out of favor with Re'im's residents.

The Israel Defense Forces (IDF) has a base near the kibbutz. Prior to the Israeli disengagement from Gaza in 2005, the base was used as a camp for the evacuating troops. After the disengagement, Re'im became the target of Qassam rockets fired at it from the Gaza Strip. In 2008, IDF troops at the nearby base close to Nahal Oz requested that the base be relocated to the area near Re'im, away from the range of Hamas' mortar fire.

On 7 October 2023, Re'im was attacked by Hamas during the battle of Re'im. Dozens of Israeli casualties were reported from the area. On the same day, the Nova music festival was taking place on the kibbutz grounds. Hamas overran the event and indiscriminately shot into the crowd, killing hundreds and committing acts of rape and sexual assault. Many other festival-goers were wounded and some were taken hostage by Hamas. In the aftermath, the kibbutz's surviving residents were evacuated to Eilat, before being relocated to Tel Aviv.

== Economy ==
As of 2008, the kibbutz's economy was based on agriculture and its laser factory, Isralaser. IsraBig, which manufactures dies for stamping, also has a factory in Re'im. The kibbutz also has a room letting business, including a Bedouin accommodation tent. It suffered as a result of the Israel–Gaza conflict, and the kibbutz lowered its prices sometime around 2008. The kibbutz’s economic operations are overseen by a business chairman and an economic management team responsible for preparing an annual business plan, ensuring that profits are reinvested into maintaining and improving community services including health, education, and cultural activities.

In 2008, Re'im embarked on a project that was planned make it the first community in Israel, and perhaps in the entire world, to rely entirely on solar energy for domestic consumption. Sunday, a company which marketed the technology in Israel, was to install solar panels on all 130 rooftops in the kibbutz. The cost of the project was estimated at ₪60–100 million and the investment was expected to pay for itself in 10 years. The cost and revenues from electricity were to be divided evenly between the kibbutz and Sunday, and any excess energy was to be sold to the Israel Electric Company.

Being one of the Gaza-vicinity villages, as of 2022, its residents are given an income tax benefit in accordance with Article 11 of the Income Tax Ordinance.

== Security ==
Re'im is eligible for support in building fortified residential shelters, Merkhav Mugan Dirati, available for localities situated within a 7-kilometer radius from the Gaza Strip.

In June 2015, the construction of these residential shelters within individual family homes was completed. Given kibbutz Re'im's geographic proximity to Gaza, when a Red Color alarm is triggered, residents are required to promptly find shelter within a window of 8–15 seconds.

== Archaeology ==
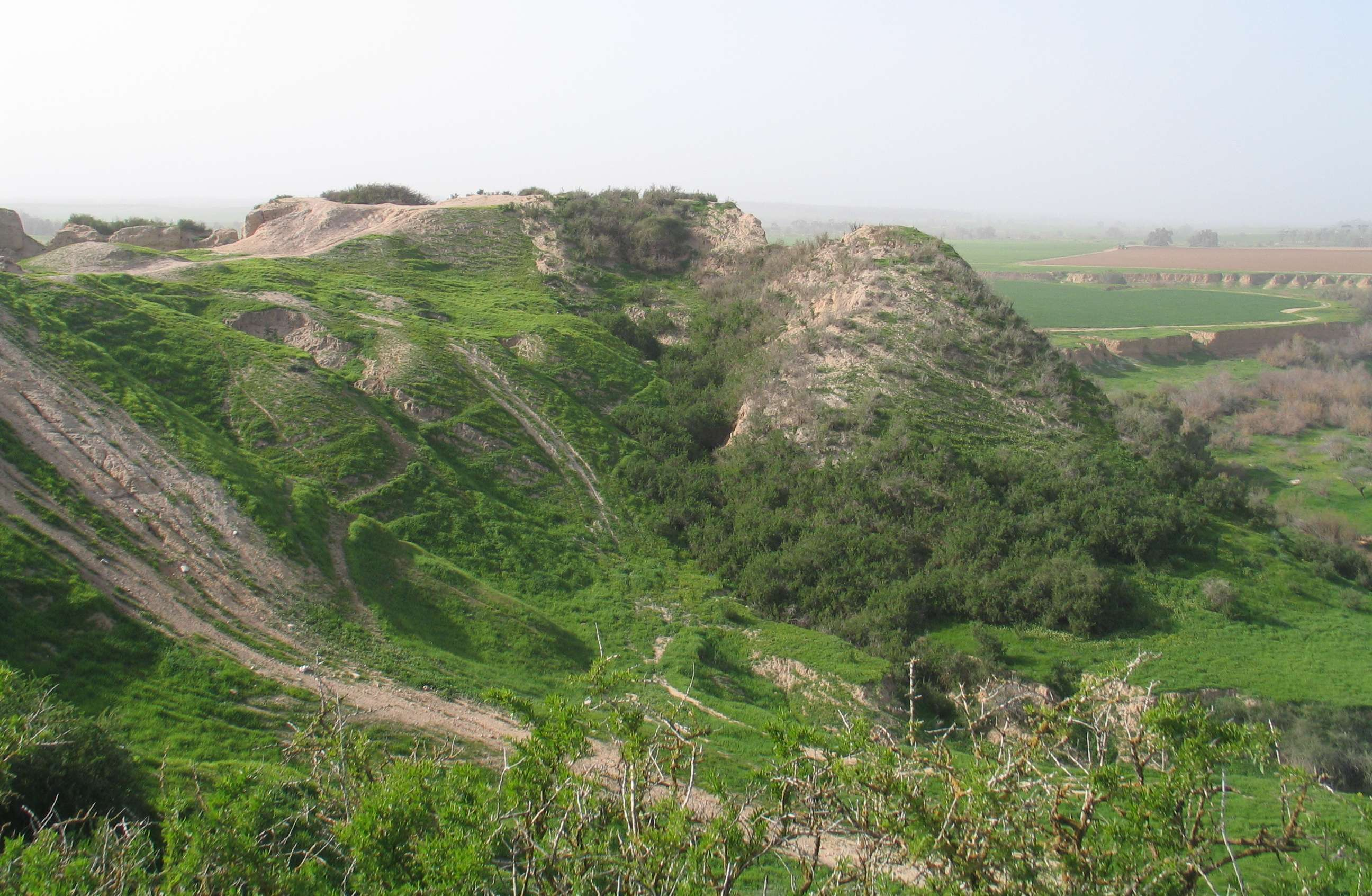
Tell Jemmeh, near kibbutz Re'im

Tell Jemmeh is a prominent 23 meter high mound located near Re'im. Archaeologists identify Tel Jemmeh with the Canaanite royal city of Yursa mentioned in the records of Thutmose III Pharaoh of Egypt who describes the city as the southernmost of the Canaanite cities that rebelled against Egypt.

During the period of the Amarna letters, a Canaanite governor named Pu-Ba'lu, who corresponded with Akhenaten, ruled the city.

Yursa is mentioned again in the inscription of Esarhaddon, King of Assyria, in which it is mentioned as one of the cities that rebelled against the Assyrian kingdom and as a result it was conquered and its queen was exiled to Nineveh.

Around a kilometre north to Re'im are remains that have been identified tentatively with those of the village of Kefar She'arta. These remains include an ancient building, a round cistern and fragments of pottery and glass from the Byzantine period. Yizhar Hirschfeld suggests that the building could have been the monastery of Zeno the Prophet, a 5th-century hermit.

== See also ==
- Netiv HaAsara massacre
- Be'eri massacre
- Kfar Aza massacre
