= Ibim =

Village in southern Israel

Ibim: אִבִּים, איבים (Hebrew)

Hebrew transcription(s)
  - Official: Ibbim
- Location within Ashkelon region of Israel
- Coordinates: 31°32′1″N 34°36′35″E
- Country: Israel
- District: Southern
- Subdistrict: Ashkelon
- Council: Sha'ar HaNegev
- Founded: 1992
- Population (2024): 575

Ibim (Hebrew: אִבִּים, lit. 'Blossoms') is a village in southern Israel. Located near Sderot, it falls under the jurisdiction of Sha'ar HaNegev Regional Council. In 2024 it had a population of 575.

== Etymology ==
Ibim is a biblical name derived from verse 6:11 in the Song of Solomon; "I went down to the nut orchard to look at the blossoms of the valley'"

== History ==
Originally a farm, in 1953 the center for Sha'ar HaNegev Regional Council was established on the site. In 1992 a student village with the same name was established in order to provide dwellings for immigrants from Ethiopia and the former Soviet Union who were studying at the nearby Sapir Academic College.
