= Ein HaBesor =

Moshav in southern Israel

Ein HaBesor: עֵין הַבְּשׂוֹר (Hebrew)
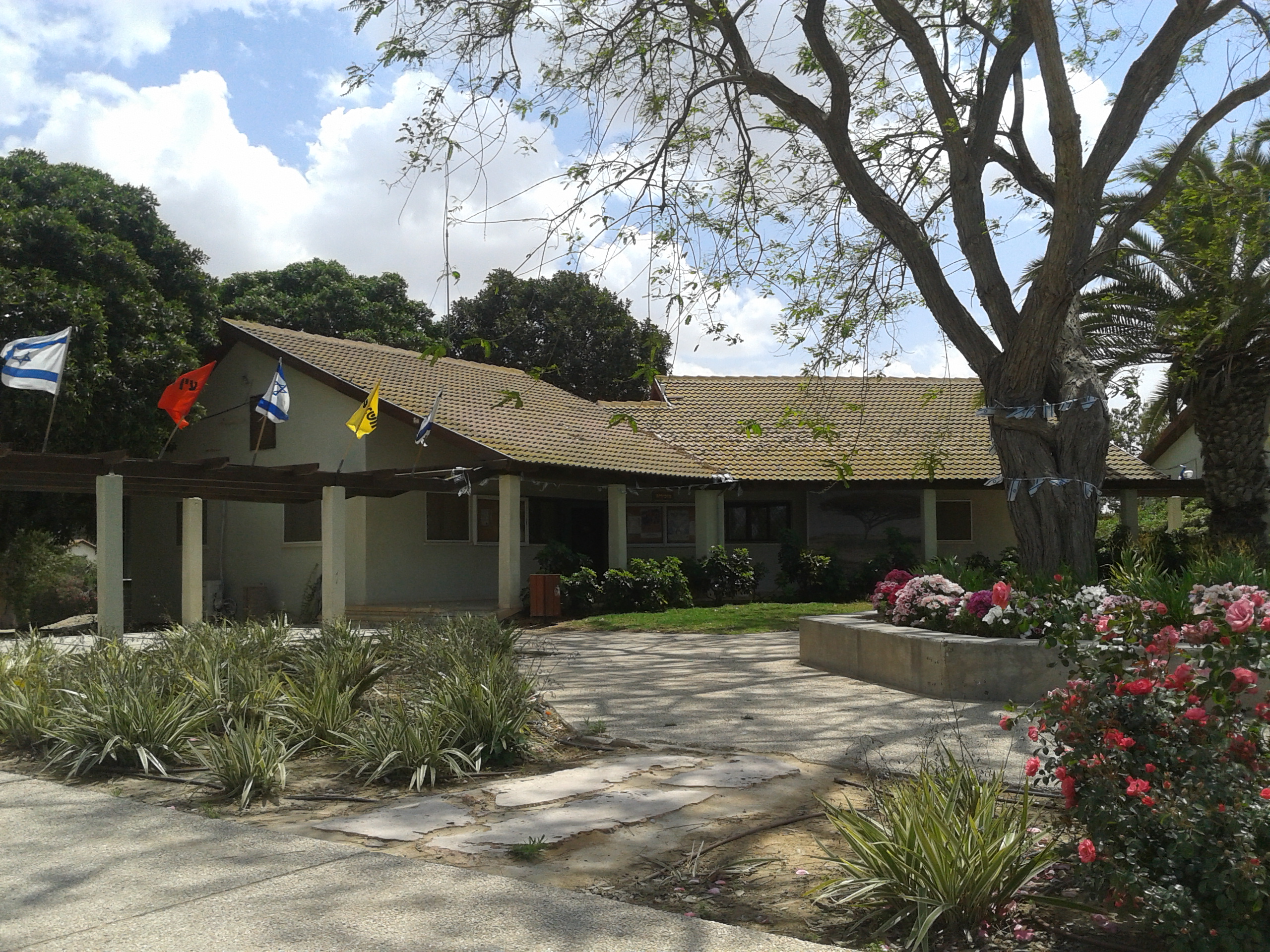

- Location within Northwest Negev region of Israel Location within Israel
- Coordinates: 31°16′56″N 34°27′1″E
- Country: Israel
- District: Southern
- Subdistrict: Beersheba
- Council: Eshkol
- Affiliation: Moshavim Movement
- Founded: 1982
- Founder: Evacuated settlers
- Population (2024): 1,501

Ein HaBesor (Hebrew: עֵין הַבְּשׂוֹר, lit. 'Spring of the Besor') is a moshav in southern Israel. Located in the Hevel Eshkol area of the north-western Negev desert near the border with the Gaza Strip and around a kilometre from Magen, it falls under the jurisdiction of Eshkol Regional Council. In 2024 it had a population of 1,501.

== History ==
=== Early Bronze Age ===
En Besor was an Egyptian First Dynasty staging post along the "ways of Horus" trade route in the northern Negev. The staging post was contemporary with Tell es-Sakan, and covered an estimated 1,200 square metres (13,000 sq ft). Archaeologists Pierre de Miroschedji and Moain Sadeq hypothesise that En Besor was within an area of permanent Egyptian settlement.

=== History after 1982 ===
The modern moshav was established in 1982. Some of the residents were from Sadot, an Israeli settlement in the Sinai Peninsula evacuated after signing of the Egypt–Israel peace treaty.

On 7 October 2023, Ein HaBesor was attacked by Hamas. Moshav residents, armed with four M16 rifles and some pistols, repelled the attack.
