= Ein HaShlosha =

Kibbutz in southern Israel

Ein HaShlosha: עין השלושה (Hebrew)
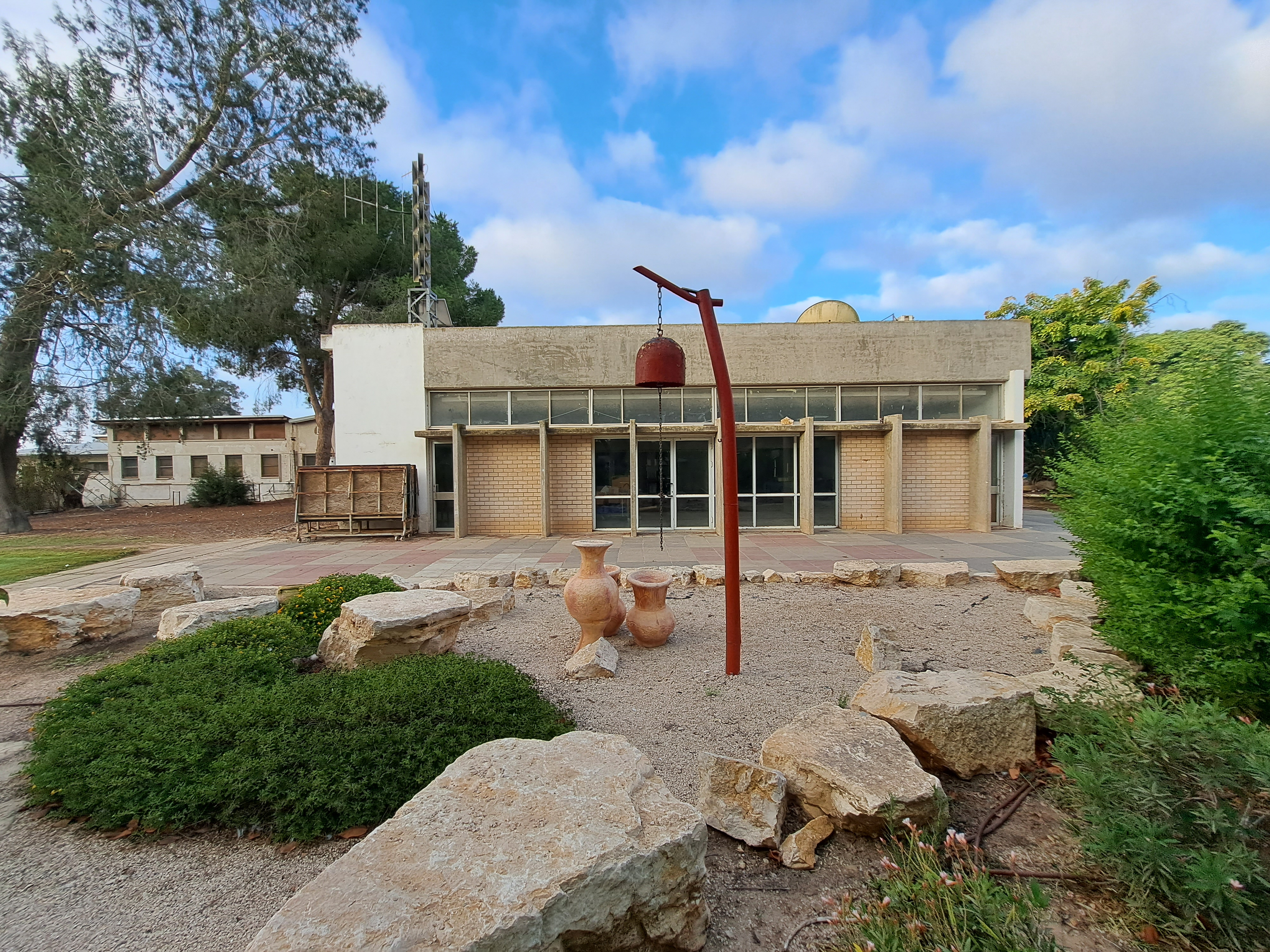
- Kibbutz dining room
- Etymology: Spring of the Three
- Location within Northwest Negev region of Israel Location within Israel
- Coordinates: 31°21′1″N 34°24′9″E
- Country: Israel
- District: Southern
- Subdistrict: Beersheba
- Council: Eshkol
- Affiliation: Kibbutz Movement
- Founded: 1950
- Founder: South American immigrants
- Population (2024): 379

Ein HaShlosha (Hebrew: עין השלושה, lit. 'Spring of the Three') is a kibbutz in the western Negev desert, and also in the Gaza envelope in Israel. It falls under the jurisdiction of Eshkol Regional Council.

== History ==
The kibbutz was named in memory of three of the founding members who were killed during the 1948 Arab–Israeli War: Deborah Epstein, Yaakov Baruch and Avraham Geller. It was established during the 1950s by a Nahal group of Zionist youth from South America, members of the youth movement HaNoar HaTzioni, on lands of the former kibbutz Neve Yair (Neve Yair was established in 1949 by members of the Lehi but was abandoned in June 1950).

During its first years the kibbutz suffered bombardment by the Egyptian army. Almost adjacent to the Gaza border with Khan Yunis, the kibbutz was regularly hit by Palestinian gunfire during the Gaza–Israel conflict in 2008. On 15 January 2008, an Ecuadorian volunteer, Carlos Chavez, was shot and killed by a Hamas sniper while working on the kibbutz.

During Operation Protective Edge, at least 825 rockets were fired at the Eshkol region, where the kibbutz is located. In some cases, asbestos roofs were damaged after being hit with rocket fire. The kibbutz, being near the border, has a rocket alarm only 5 seconds before the probable hit. When there are tensions, villagers stay long hours and sometimes days in bomb shelters, being unable to leave it even for a short period of time. People reportedly said they were afraid to shower, and were unable to even cook.

=== 2023 attacks ===
As part of the October 7 attacks, approximately 90 militants infiltrated the kibbutz, killing four civilians, looting, shooting, and burning houses. After a 5-month evacuation to Eilat, the kibbutz's 320 residents, including 92 children, returned in March 2024.

== Economy ==
The kibbutz is largely agricultural, relying on turkey and dairy farming. It also has a small factory that manufactures lever arch files. In March 2006 hundreds of turkeys were found dead, spreading fears of the bird flu virus in Israel.

== Notable people ==
- Yizhar Shai (born 1963), member of the Knesset
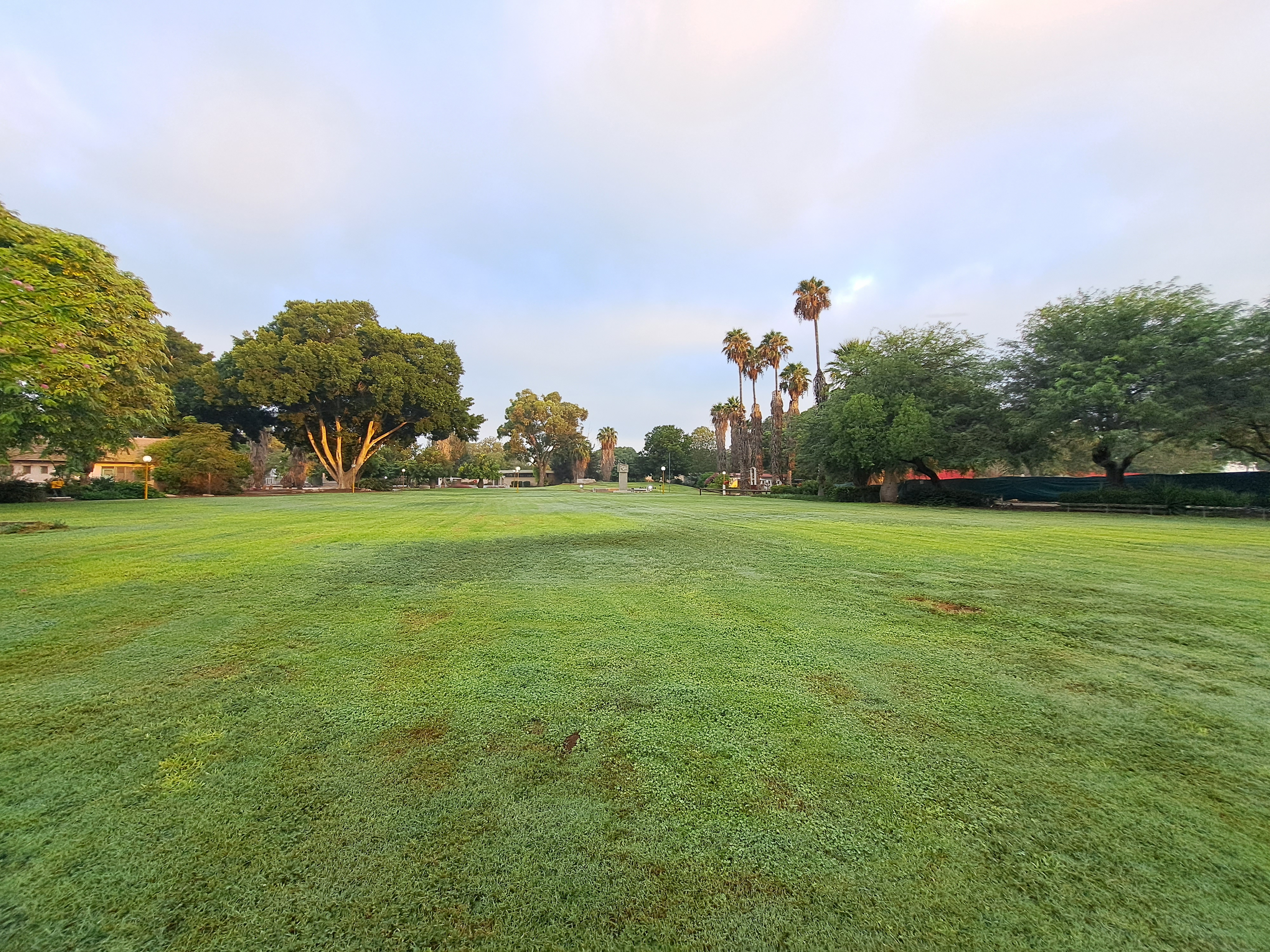
The main lawn in Kibbutz Ein Hashlosha

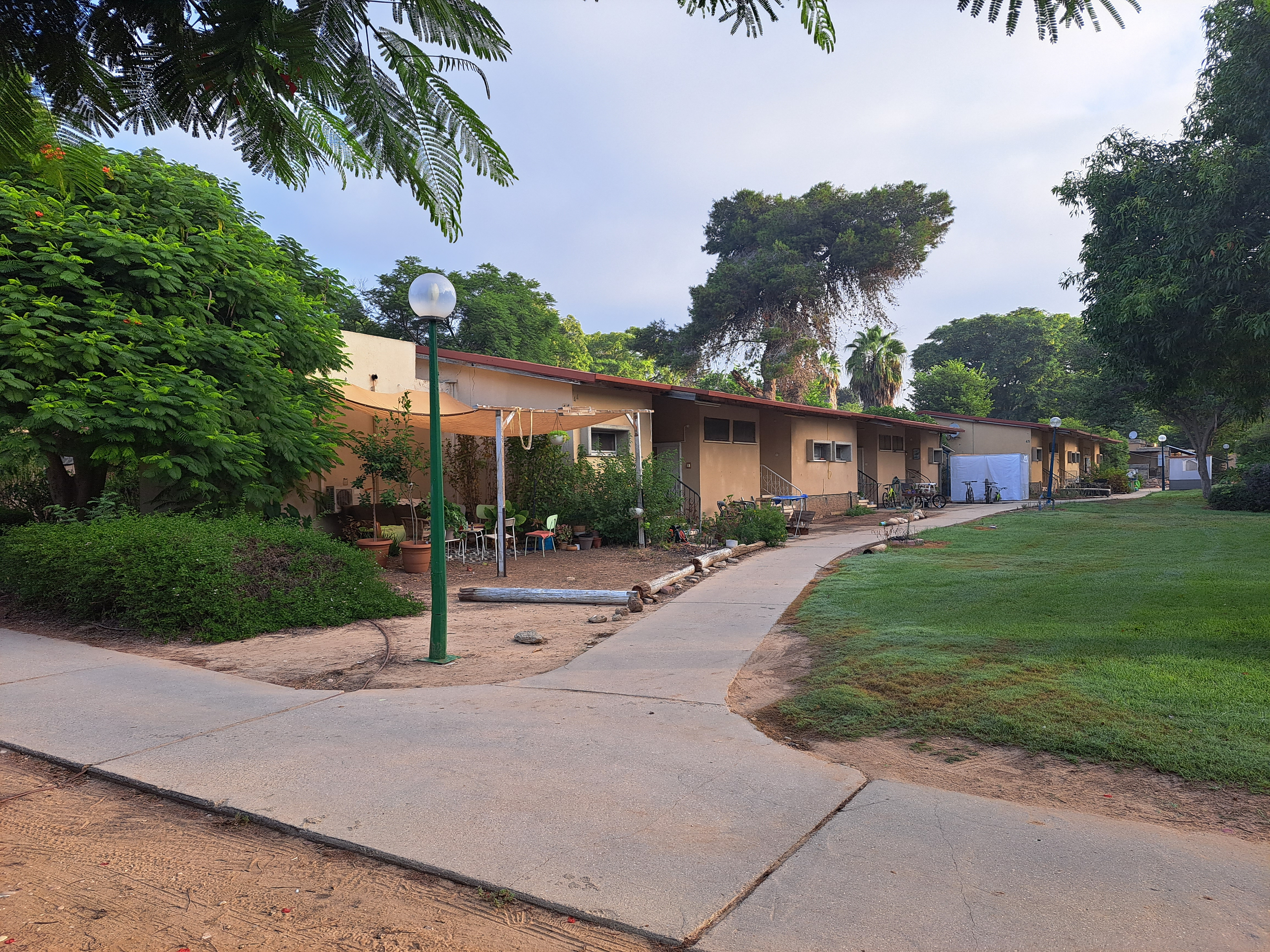
Residences

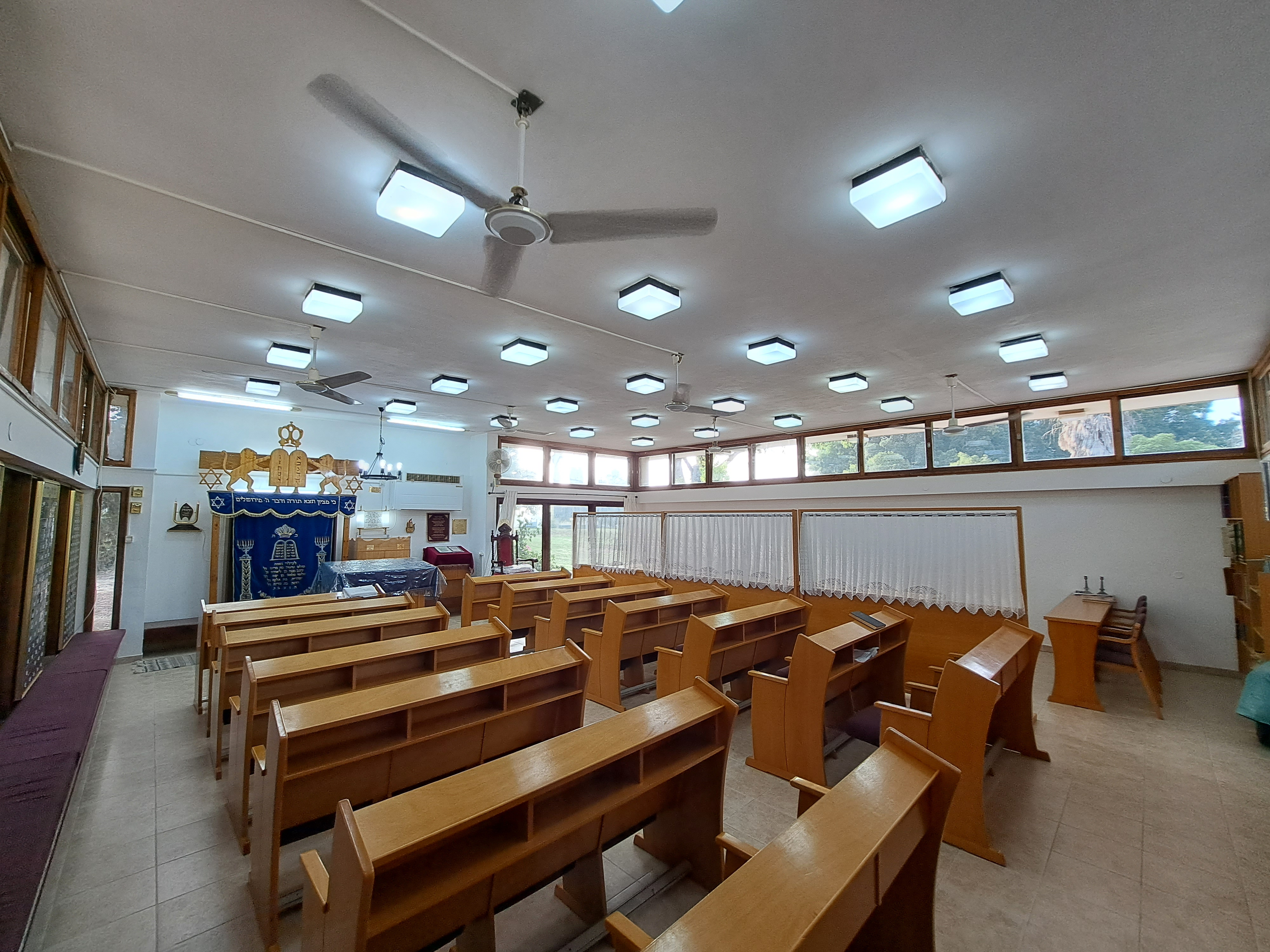
synagogue
