= Sa'ad =

Kibbutz in southern Israel

Sa'ad: סעד (Hebrew)
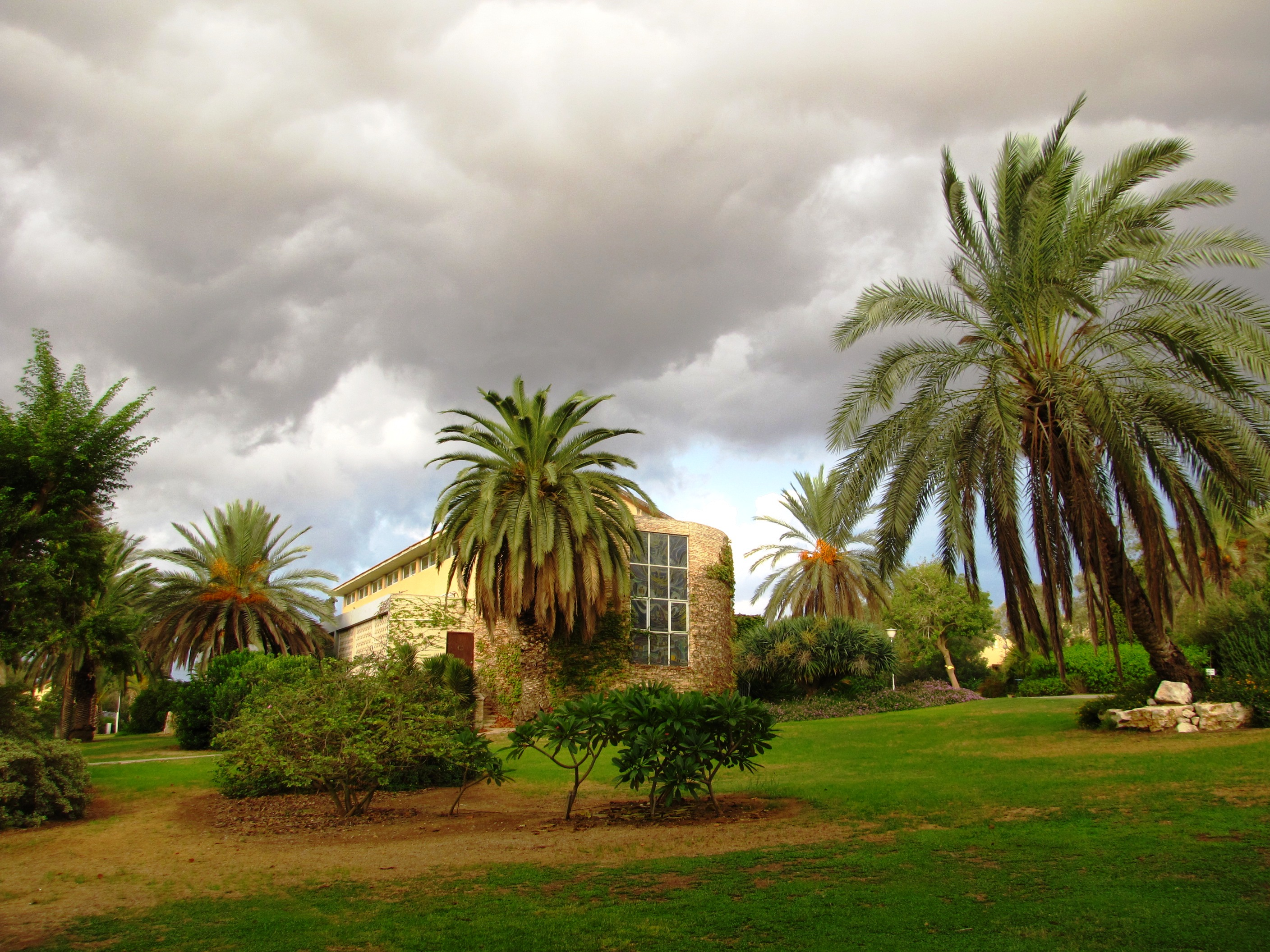
- Etymology: Aid
- Location within Northwest Negev region of Israel Location within Israel
- Coordinates: 31°28′13″N 34°32′6″E
- Country: Israel
- District: Southern
- Subdistrict: Beersheba
- Council: Sdot Negev
- Affiliation: Religious Kibbutz Movement
- Founded: 30 June 1947
- Founder: Former Bnei Akiva members
- Population (2024): 1,100
- Website: Website

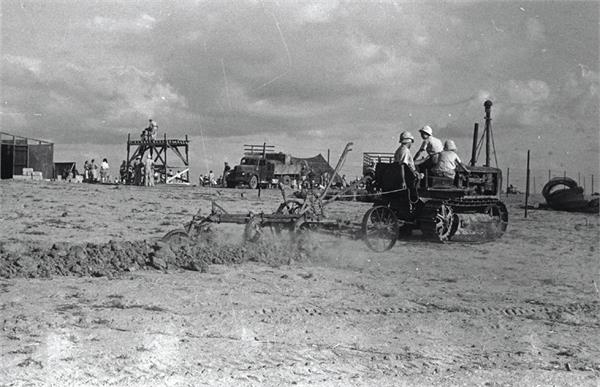
Sa'ad under construction

Sa'ad (Hebrew: סעד, lit. 'Aid') is a religious kibbutz located in the northwestern Negev desert in southern Israel. Located near the Gaza Strip, and the cities of Sderot and Netivot, it falls under the jurisdiction of Sdot Negev Regional Council. In 2024, it had a population of 1,100.

== History ==
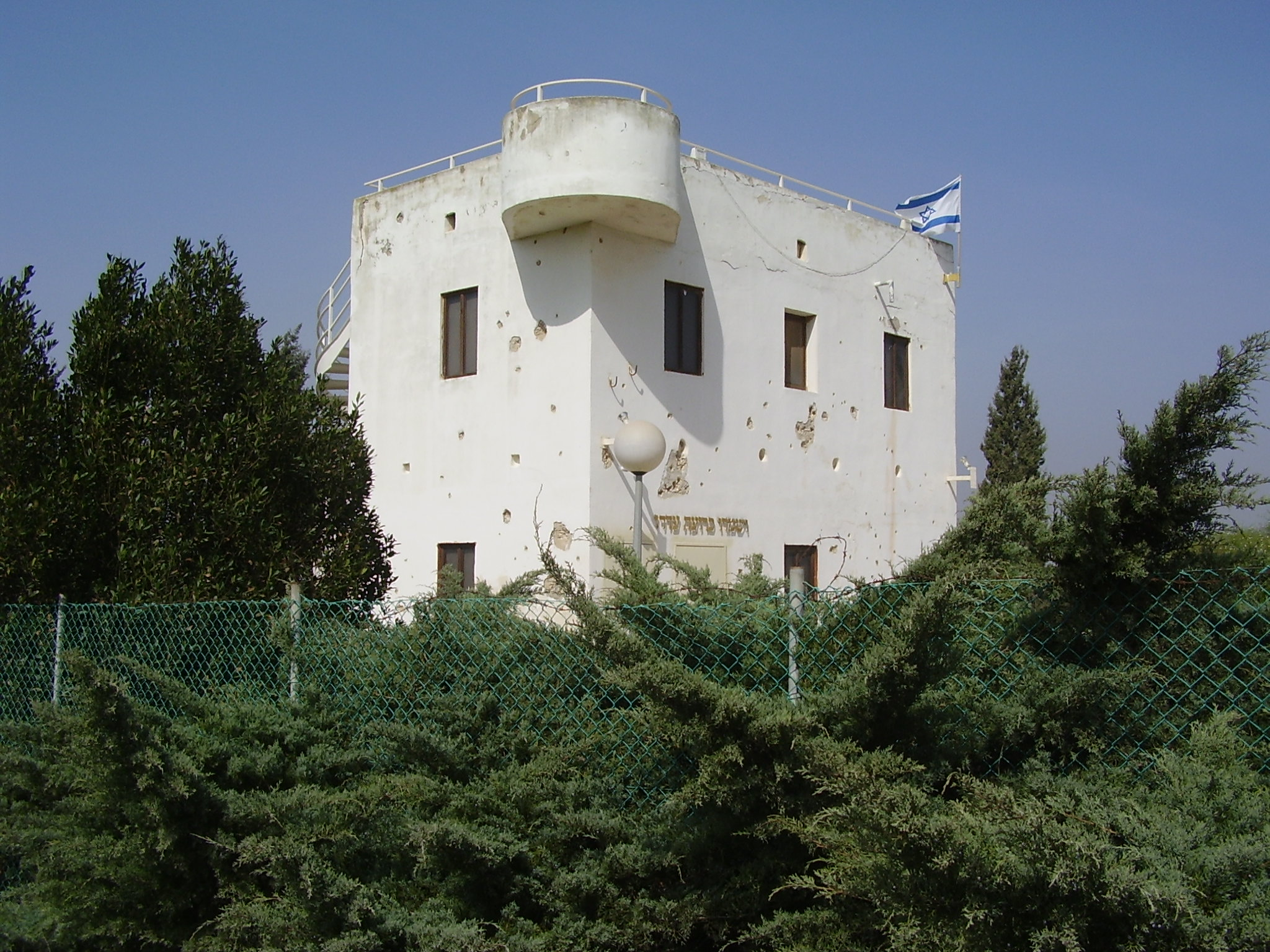
Historic watchtower

The kibbutz was founded on 30 June 1947, the day after the one-year anniversary of Operation Agatha, by graduates of the Bnei Akiva movement. It was established in a manner similar to the tower and stockade settlement campaign of the late 1930s, and was the first religious kibbutz to be founded by Sabras. During the 1948 War, the kibbutz was almost entirely destroyed by the Egyptian army. The local museum "Ma'oz Mul 'Aza" (Stronghold at Gaza) details the history of the war in this area, opposite the Gaza strip.

Following the war, the kibbutz members returned to cultivating their land, developing a multi-generational population that generates its income from agriculture and industry for more than 75 years.

On October 7, 2023 about 30 terrorists were stopped at the entrance gate by a shootout with the kibbutz’s standby squad and there were no casualties.

== Economy ==
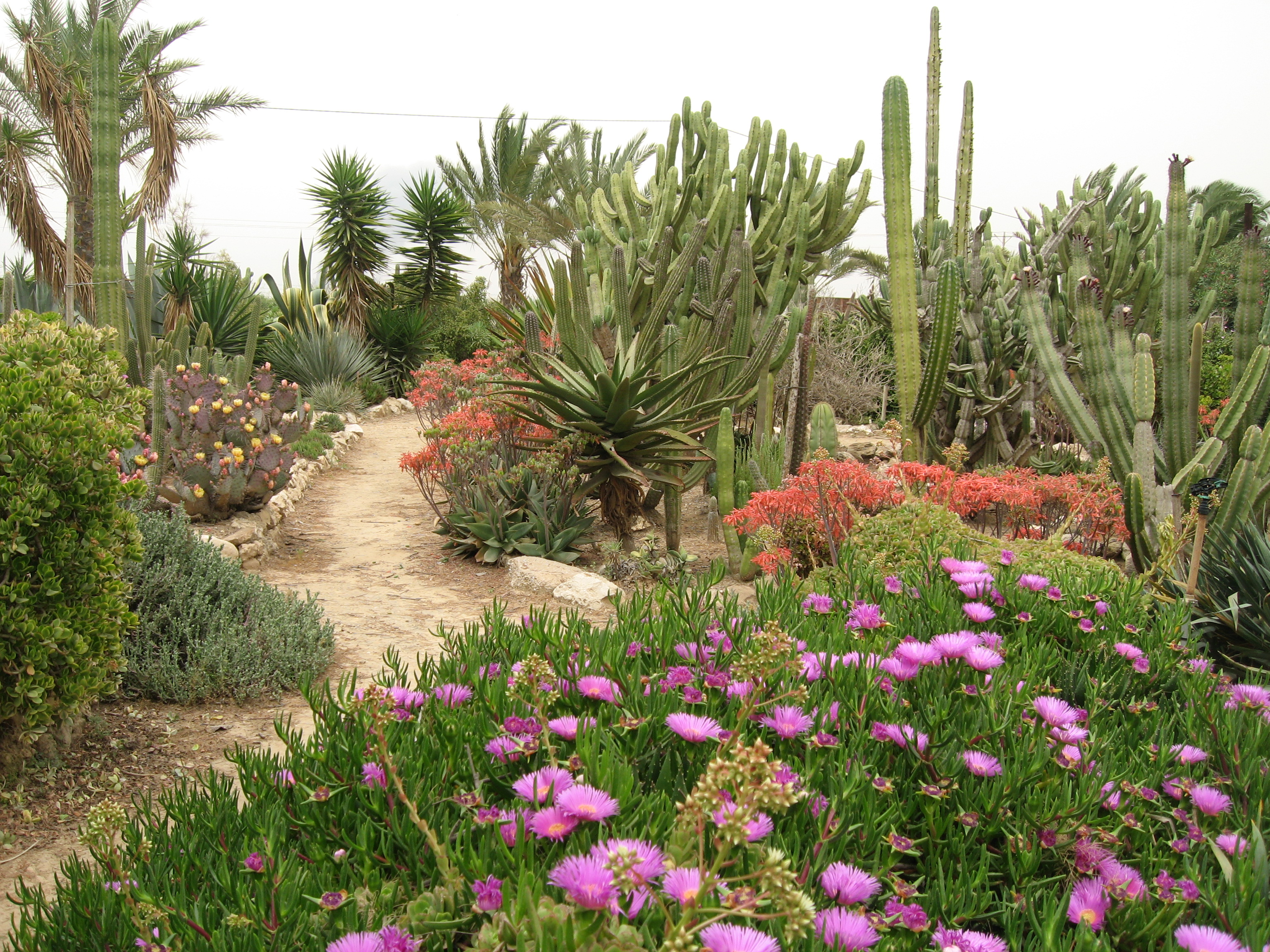
Garden in Sa'ad

Sa'ad is one of Israel's largest producers of carrots, with a quarter of the country's production. Other crops include potatoes, avocados, almonds and citrus fruit. Sa'ad has a large dairy farm and a poultry farm.

Sa'ad's industries include Syfan, a plant that manufactures plastic shrink film for packaging, and Popli, which supplies popcorn products and pet food.

The kibbutz also operates Beit Shikma, a convalescent and geriatric home for patients who require full-time care.

The dairy farm on the kibbutz was the Israeli leader in 2011 for productivity with an average of 13 785 litres per head that year. A dairy cow named Kharta, was the world record holder giving 18 208 litres of milk.

== Education ==
The kibbutz runs and participates in several unique educational frameworks such as Youth Education, a school and dormitory framework for teenagers from broken homes; Foster Family, for grade school children; Conversion Ulpan, for families and young people who are converting to Judaism; and Nativ, the USY year program in Israel for American teens.

Sa'ad has a regional religious elementary school for grades 1 through 9 under the auspices of Israel's Ministry of Education. kibbutz Sa'ad, kibbutz Alumim, and moashav Tkuma cooperate in running the Da'at School for their children. Pupils from towns in the surrounding area also attend.
