= Sapir Academic College =

College in Israel

Sapir College
- המכללה האקדמית ספיר
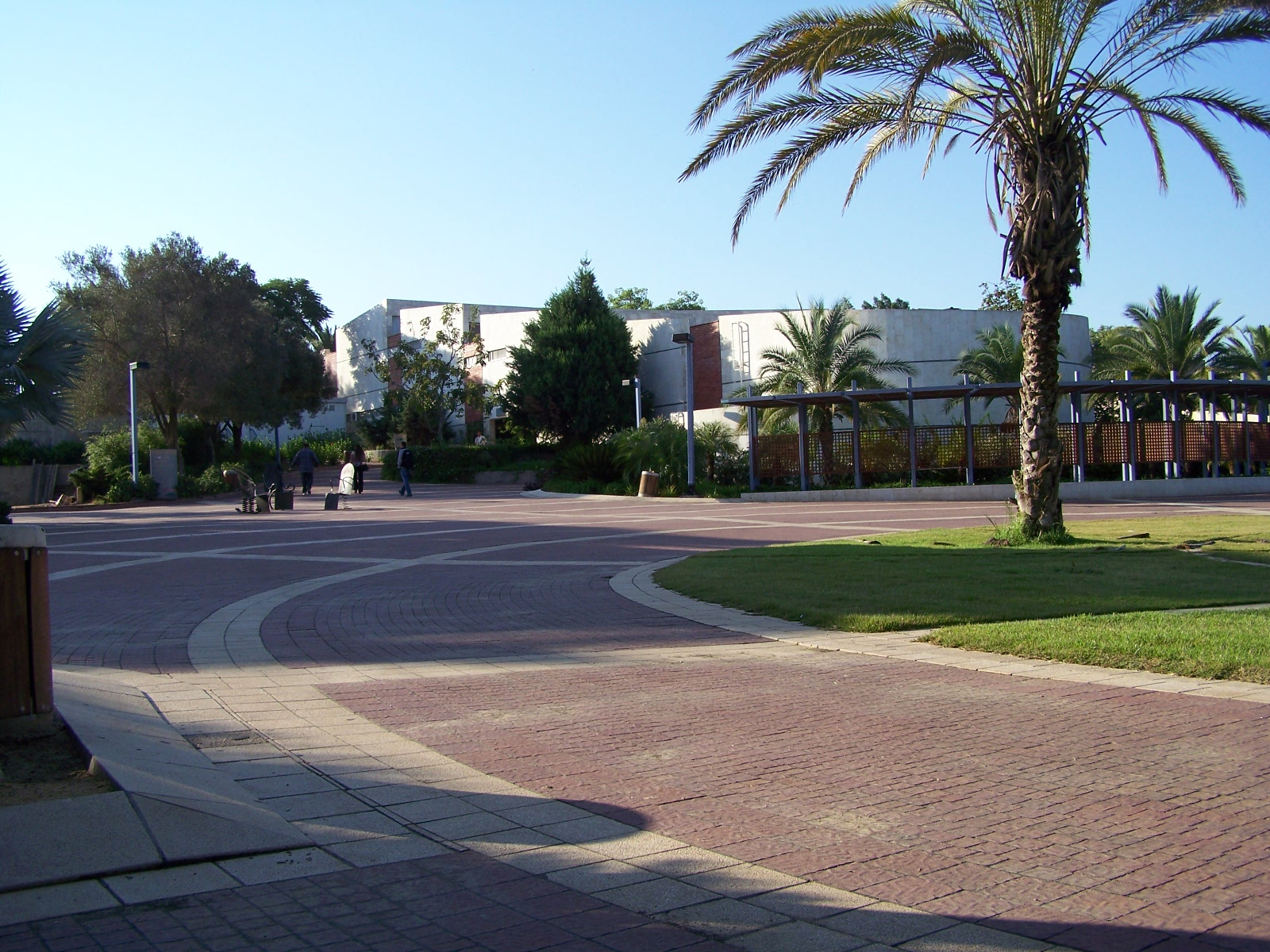
- Established: 1963
- President: Prof. Nir Kedar
- Students: 8,000
- Location: Sderot, Negev, Israel; 31°30′35″N 34°35′58″E
- Radio station: "Kol Hanegev" (106.4FM)

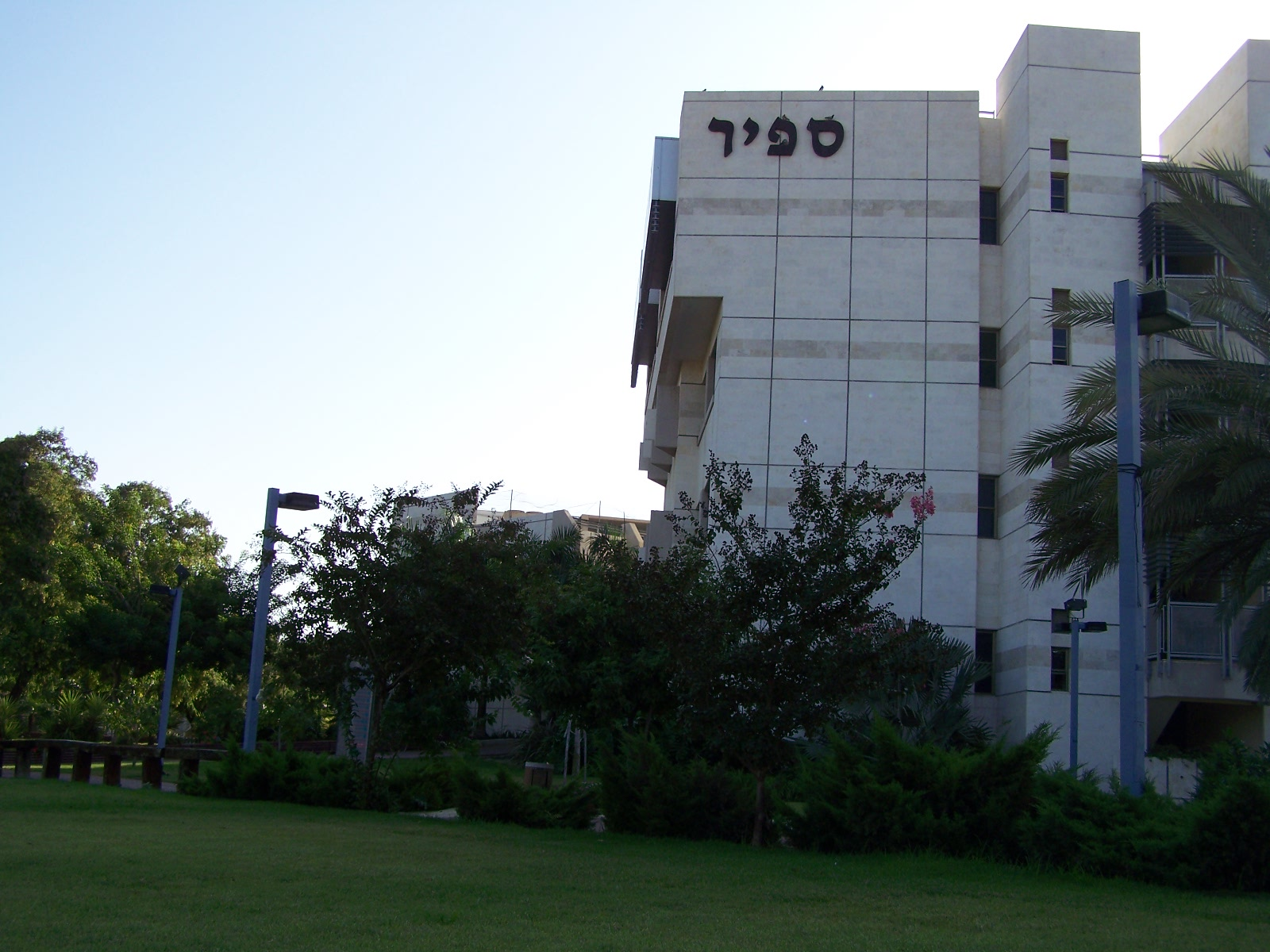

Sapir College (Hebrew: המכללה האקדמית ספיר, HaMikhlela HaAkademit Sapir) is a college in Israel, located in the northwestern Negev desert near Sderot.

It is one of Israel’s largest public colleges and the largest employer in the Gaza Envelope region. The college has 7,500 students from a diverse range of backgrounds in academic and vocational programs; and employs 1,300 faculty and staff members. Named after former Israeli Finance Minister Pinchas Sapir, the college offers programs intended to support regional development and improve access to higher education.

== Background ==
The college awards Bachelor's degrees in Communication, Cinema and Television, Software Systems, Marketing, Administration and Public Policy, Industrial Management, Law, Human Resources Management, Cultural Studies, Logistics, Economics, and Social Work, as well as a multidisciplinary B.A. in the Humanities and Social Sciences. The college also awards a Master of Arts degree in Administration and Public Policy and in Cultural Studies. The college also offers study in further five subjects (with degrees awarded by Ben-Gurion University of the Negev in Beersheba), and provides training for engineering technicians.

Several annual conferences and events are organized at the college:

- The Sderot Conference for Society is an annual event bringing together political and economical experts to discuss relevant social issues and conflicts.
- The Film Festival of the South - an international film festival organized by the department of film and television.

== History ==
The communities of Sha'ar HaNegev Regional Council established the college in 1963 as an evening school for adult higher education. It later became an Academic College affiliated with Ben-Gurion University of the Negev. Sapir was granted independent academic accreditation from the Council for Higher Education in 1998.

During the October 7 attacks on Israel, 47 members of the Sapir community were murdered. The College conducted efforts to evacuate staff and students, establish emergency funds, and provide psychological support. Following the attacks, Sapir launched an emergency fund for basic needs and emotional support. It also offered special aid for displaced students, reserve soldiers, and trauma-affected individuals.

Due to the Gaza war, the 2023-2024 academic year took place at locations throughout Israel and online. Sapir re-opened for in-person lectures and campus activities on November 3, 2024.

== See also ==
- List of universities and colleges in Israel
