= Magen, Israel =

Kibbutz in southern Israel

Magen: מָגֵן (Hebrew)
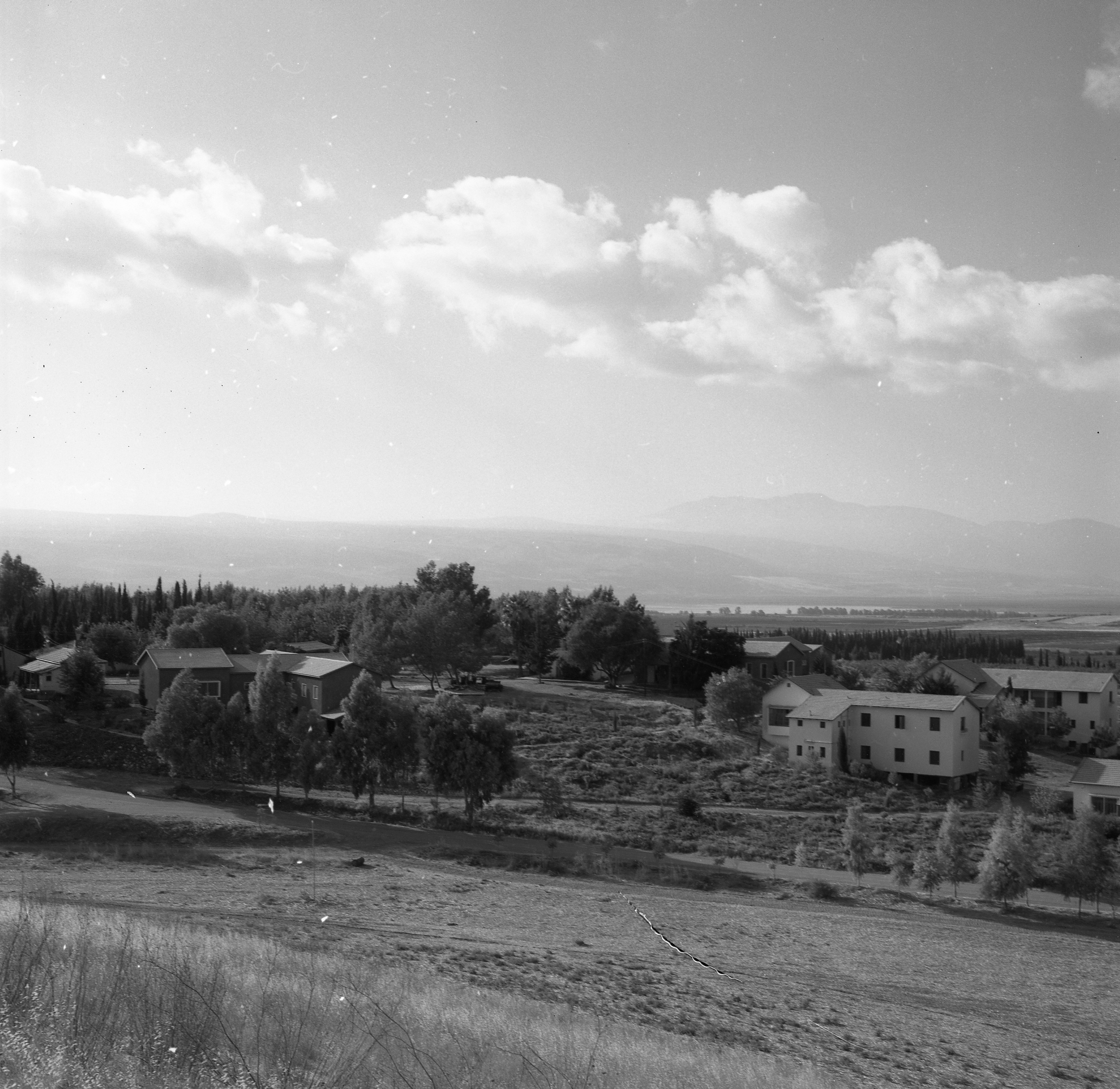

- Location within Northwest Negev region of Israel Location within Israel
- Coordinates: 31°17′59″N 34°25′37″E
- Country: Israel
- District: Southern
- Subdistrict: Beersheba
- Council: Eshkol
- Affiliation: Kibbutz Movement
- Founded: 16 August 1949
- Founder: Romanian Jews
- Population (2024): 540
- Website: www.magen.org.il

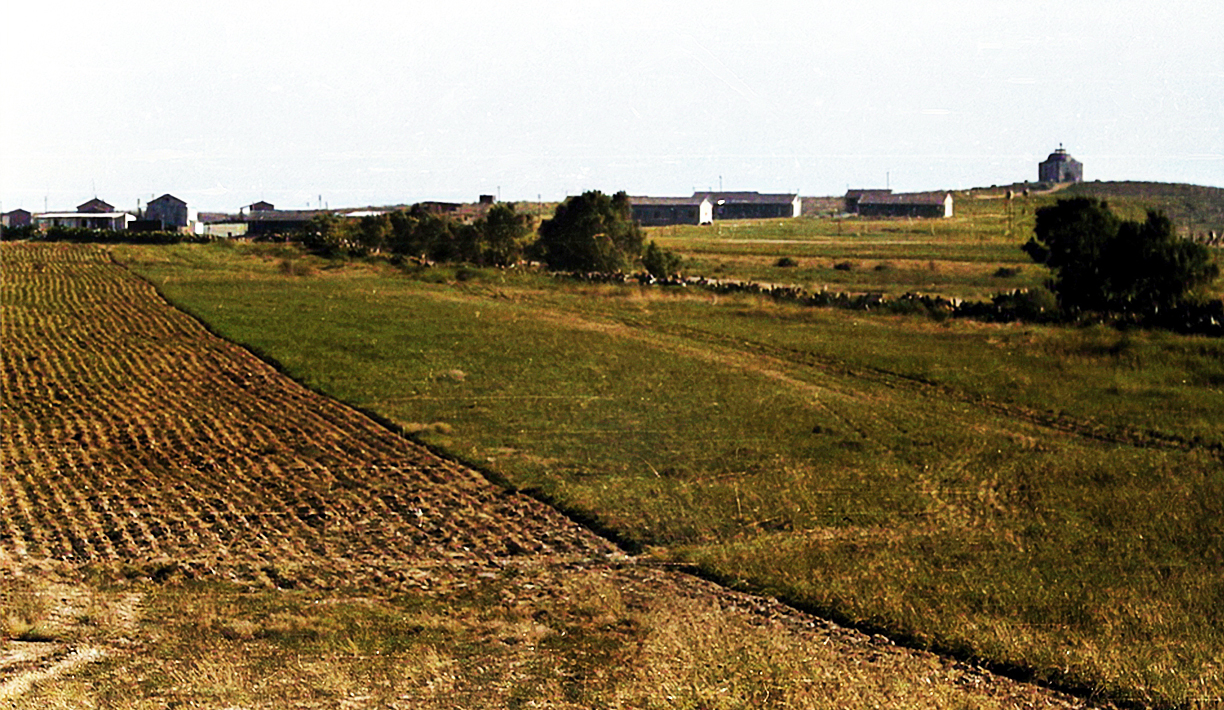
Magen in 1949

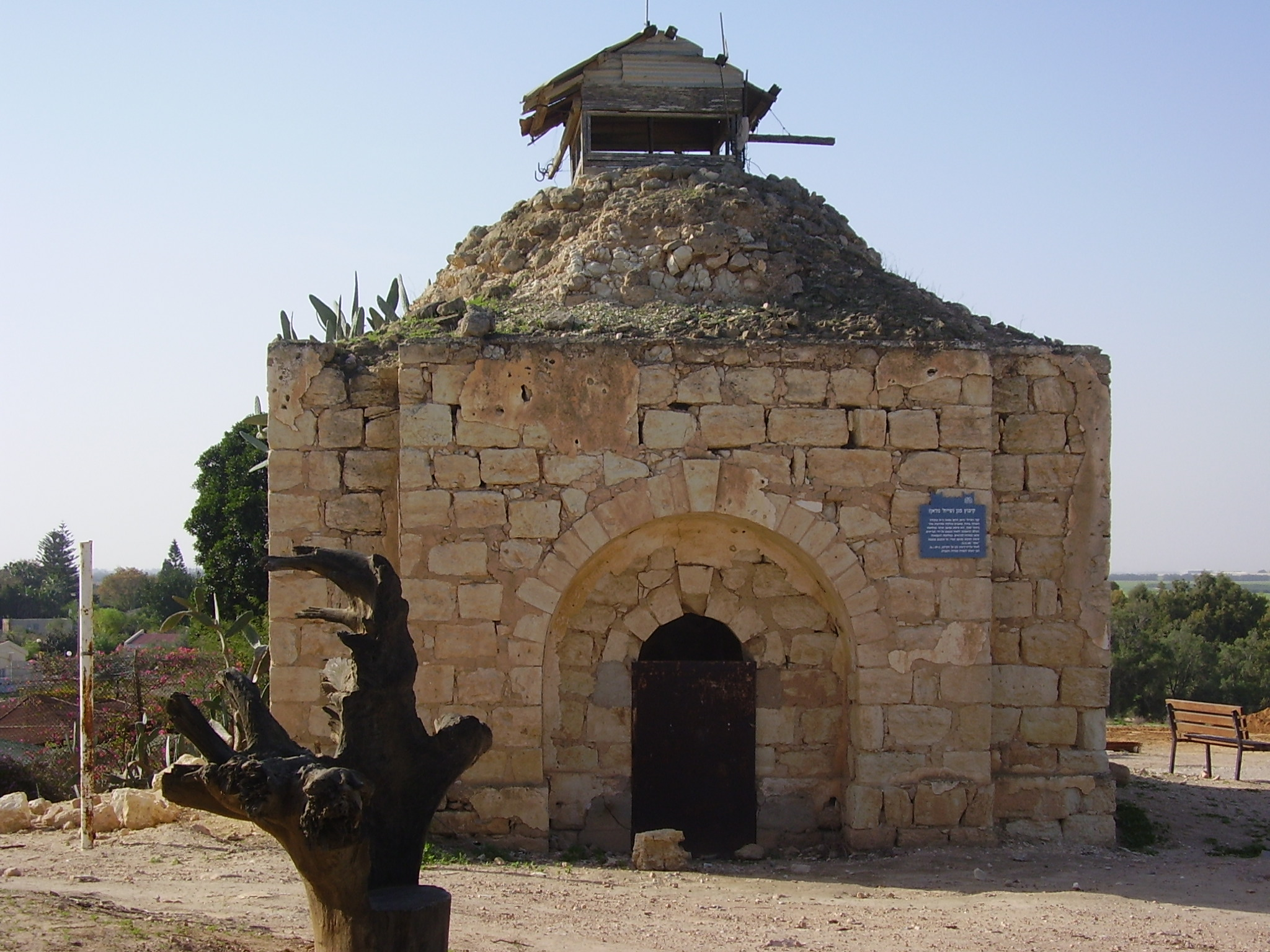
Tomb of Sheikh Nuran

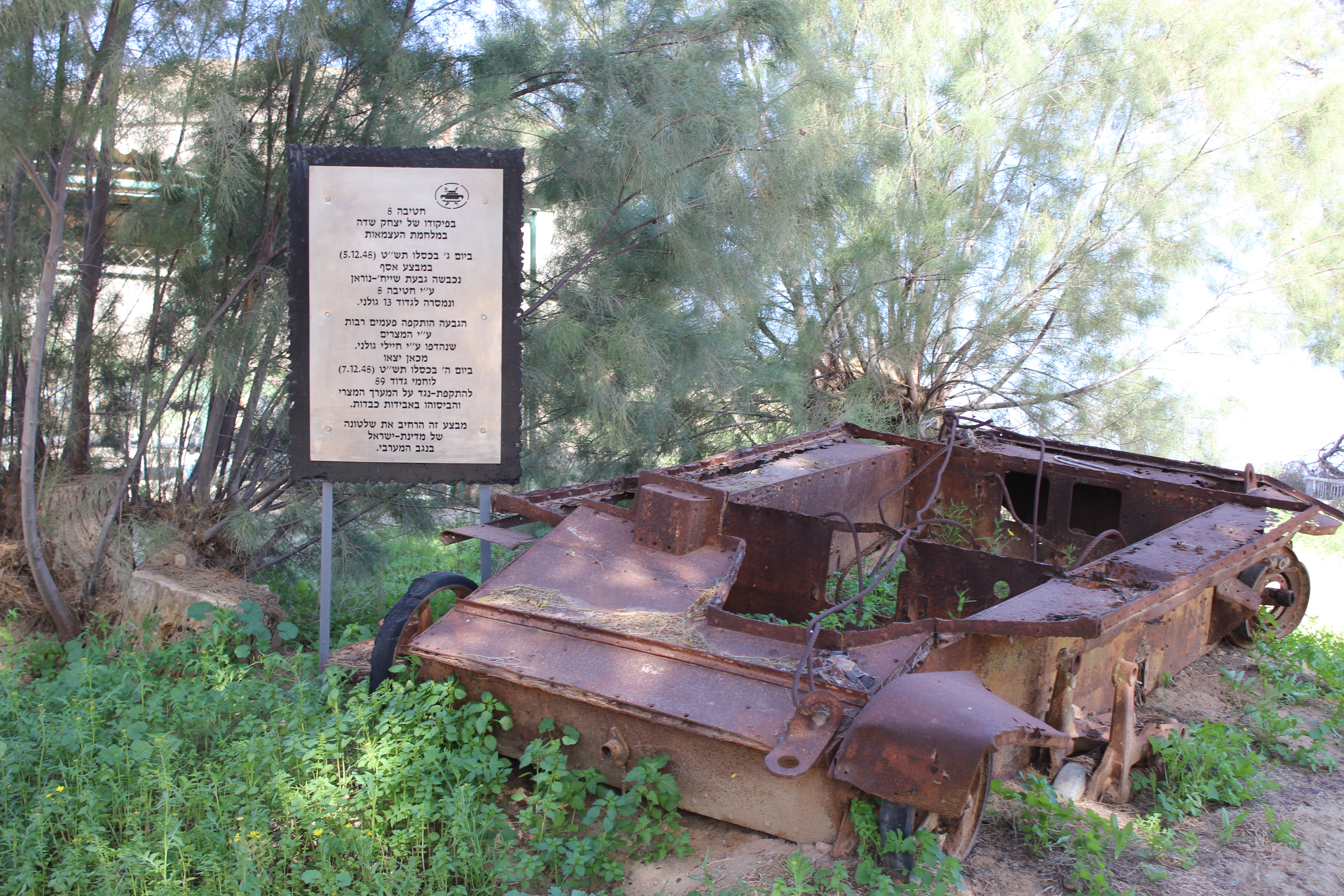
Remnants of the 1948 Arab–Israeli War

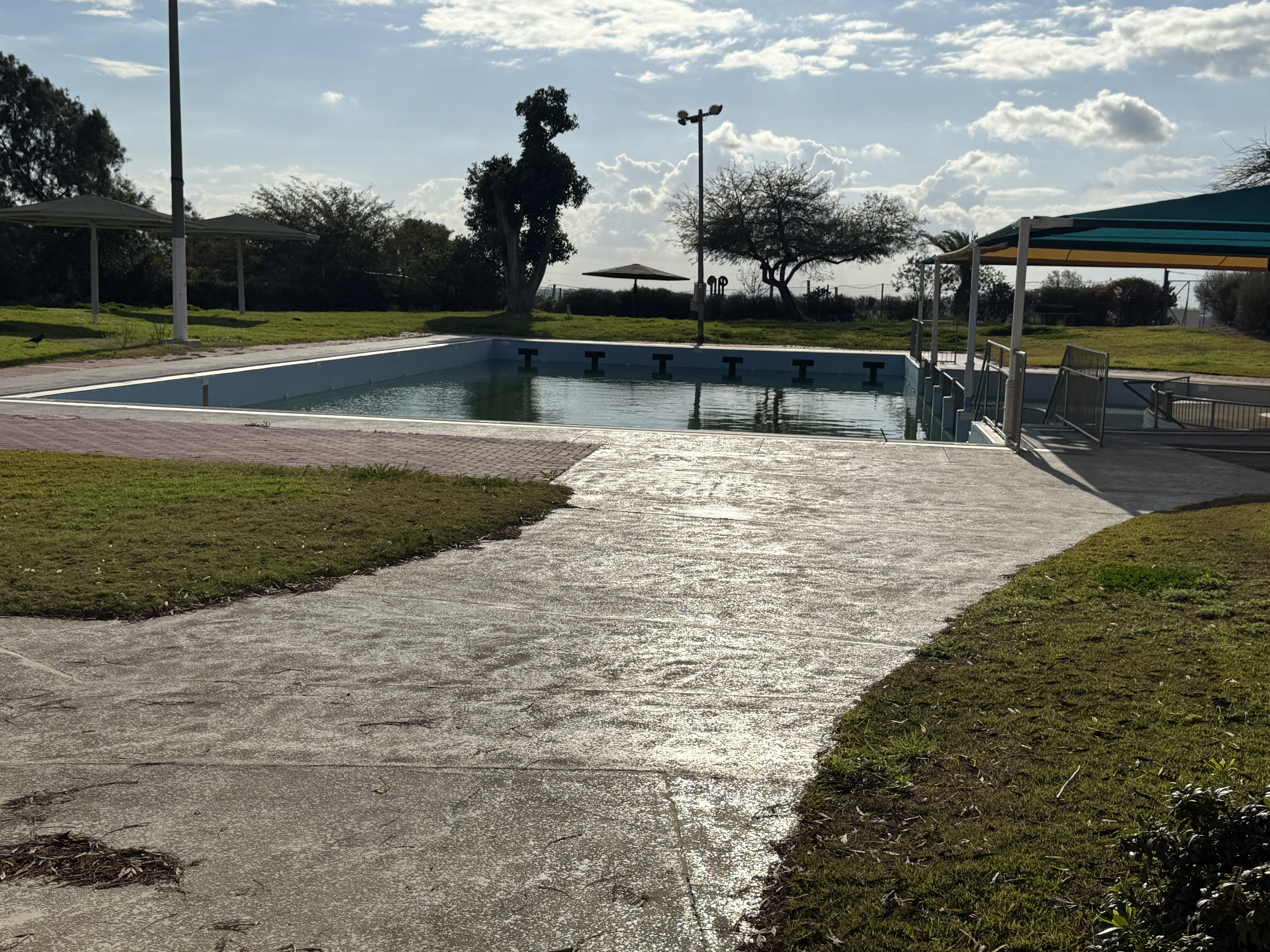
Swimming pool in Magen

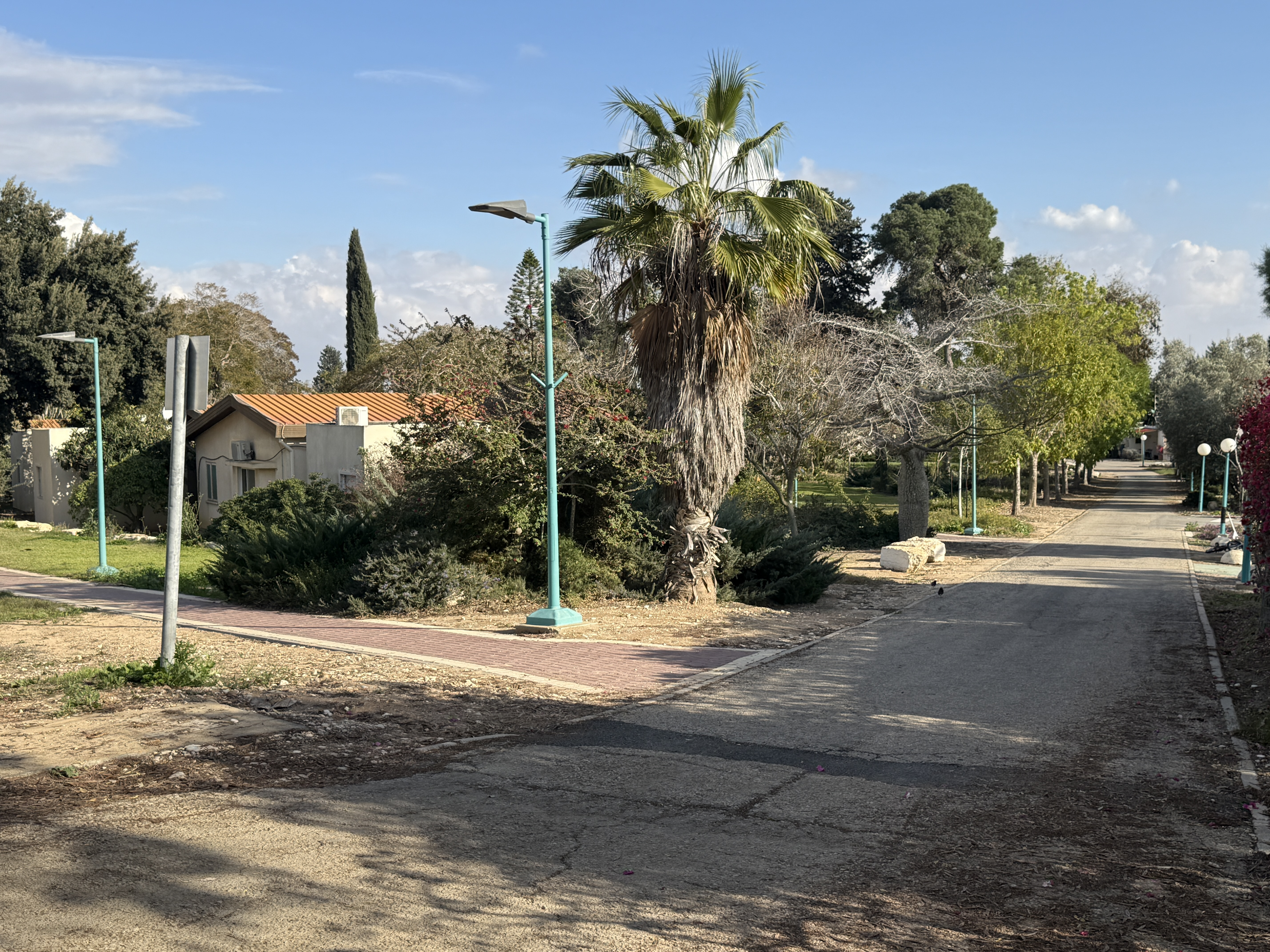
Street and house

Magen (Hebrew: מָגֵן, lit. 'Shield') is a kibbutz in southern Israel. Located in the north-western Negev desert and covering 8,500 dunams, it falls under the jurisdiction of Eshkol Regional Council. In 2024, it had a population of 540.

== History ==
During World War I British forces established an air base at the village site after the withdrawal of the Turks. The kibbutz was established by immigrants from Romania on 16 August 1949. The site also contains the remains of the maqam of Sheikh Nuran, either the site of the biblical town of Bethul (Joshua 19:4) or the site of a fourth-century Byzantine monastery.

Excavations revealed traces of Late Ottoman infant jar-burials, commonly associated with nomads or itinerant workers of Egyptian origins.

Magen is considered, according to Le Monde, a leftwing kibbutz. Magen produced avocados and peanuts. Today it manufactures solar panels and has agricultural enterprise.

During the 2023 Hamas-led attack on Israel, Magen was one of the Israeli villages attacked, but its civil defense team fought off the Hamas militants. Israeli forces counterattacked with tanks the following day, successfully eliminating the remaining Hamas assailants in the vicinity of the kibbutz. The militants blew up the fence of the kibbutz and Hamas motorbikes and cars were in the perimeter of Magen. The Civil defence first tried to speak with the approaching armed men. The militants opened fire and a battle began. Some of the civilians continued to fight even when injured. Two Kibbutz members were killed by Hamas. After the battle the kibbutz had to evacuate to the Dead Sea, they had only a few hours to pack their things. The kibbutz was the first Israeli community to return.

The swimming pool at the 1996 Atlanta Olympics, at which the Israeli 4×100 meters medley relay squad made the finals, was heated by solar panels manufactured by the kibbutz.

== Archaeology ==
A church complex consisting of four buildings was discovered at kibbutz Magen which sheds light on features of church construction during the Byzantine period. It was a basilica dedicated to St. Elias. Mosaics, inscriptions, glass, pottery and several coins were unearthed in these excavations.
