= Blueprint Negev =

Jewish National Fund project

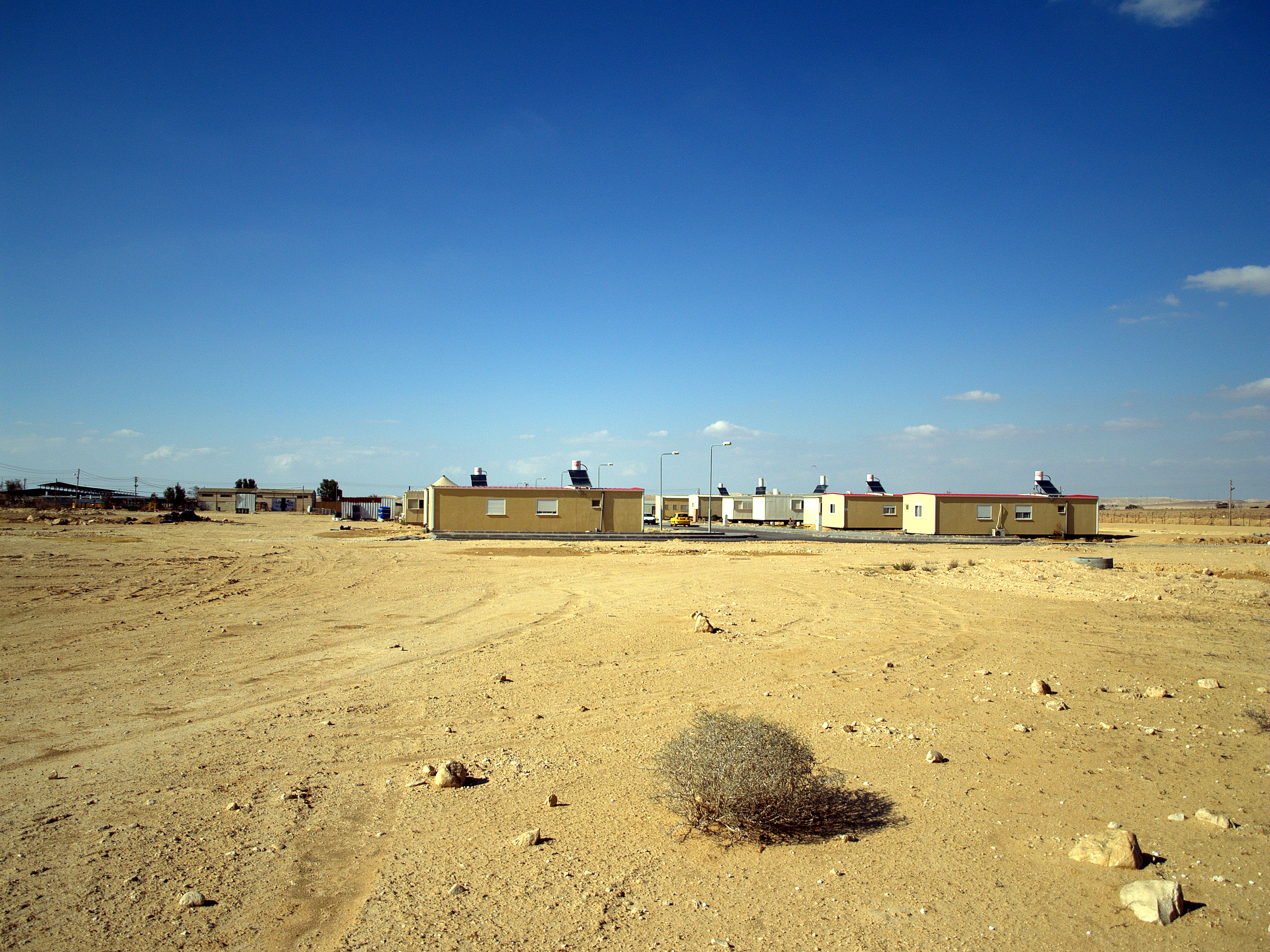
A community made up of Blueprint Negev mobile homes

Blueprint Negev is a Jewish National Fund (JNF) project to construct new Jewish communities in the Negev region of Israel and boost Jewish settlement in the region.

== History ==
The last large-scale development project to accommodate and promote new Jewish immigration was during the 1980s, when "Operation Promised Land" was launched to accommodate massive upsurge of Jewish immigration from the Soviet Union and Ethiopia.

In May 2006, Shimon Peres said that his first task as Minister of Development of the Negev and Galilee would be to promote the construction of a new Jewish community in the Negev, Karmit, the first to be built under the Blueprint Negev plan after Be'er Milka. Ynet reported that the community was "designated for wealthy, young American immigrants who want to make aliyah and live in style." Former JNF President Ronald Lauder said that Blueprint Negev answers the need for Jews looking to make aliyah the pioneering way.

== Population redistribution ==
The plan aims to bring 250,000 new residents to the Negev over ten years. Toward that goal, the project has sought to direct Anglo (English-speaking) immigration to the Negev and has compiled a database (currently containing some 10,000 names) of current Israeli citizens interested in relocating to the Negev. After the Disengagement together with the Or Negev settlement movement, the JNF was instrumental in helping Gaza evacuees find new homes in the Negev as cohesive units.

== Beersheba redevelopment ==
The plan aims to increase the population of Beersheba, the Negev's largest city. One of the main projects undertaken there is the Be’er Sheva River Walk, creating a 900-acre (3.6 km^{2}) park inspired by San Antonio's River Walk. The plan includes green spaces, an amphitheater for events, a lake for boating and promenades for strolling. The JNF supported cleanup of the riverbed.

== New suburban communities ==
The plan envisions the creation of 25 new suburban communities. Seven communities that have already been established are Sansana (1999) 54 families, Tzukim (2001) 72 families, Merchav Am (2002) 34 families, Giv’ot Bar/Shomria (2004) 30 families, Haruv (2005) 30 families, Be'er Milka/Kmehin (2006) 12 families, Karmit, and Kasif. Sansana is part of the Har Hebron Regional Council governing Hebron-area settlements.

== Environmental and social criticism ==
Israeli and Jewish American environmental groups have expressed concern that creation of isolated suburban communities in the Negev will lead to water and energy intensive suburban sprawl and strain Bedouin-Jewish relations. They argue that the planned developments will require a large public investment per capita that benefits a small number of comparatively well-off immigrants in a region with high poverty rates. Daniel Orenstein claims the project is not the answer to overdevelopment in the north. Blueprint Negev has been accused of discriminating against Bedouins and endangering their way of life.

== Clean-Tech clustering project ==
In 2012, the OECD presented a paper for promoting development in the Negev, "Clean-Tech Clustering as an Engine for Local Development: The Negev Region." It cited the Negev's "niche in research, demonstration and testing in renewable energies and water efficiency," and described the region's 50 clean-tech businesses, 4 technological incubators and clean-tech research capacity as a "serious comparative advantage."
