= Carmit =

Community settlement in southern Israel

Carmit: כרמית (Hebrew)
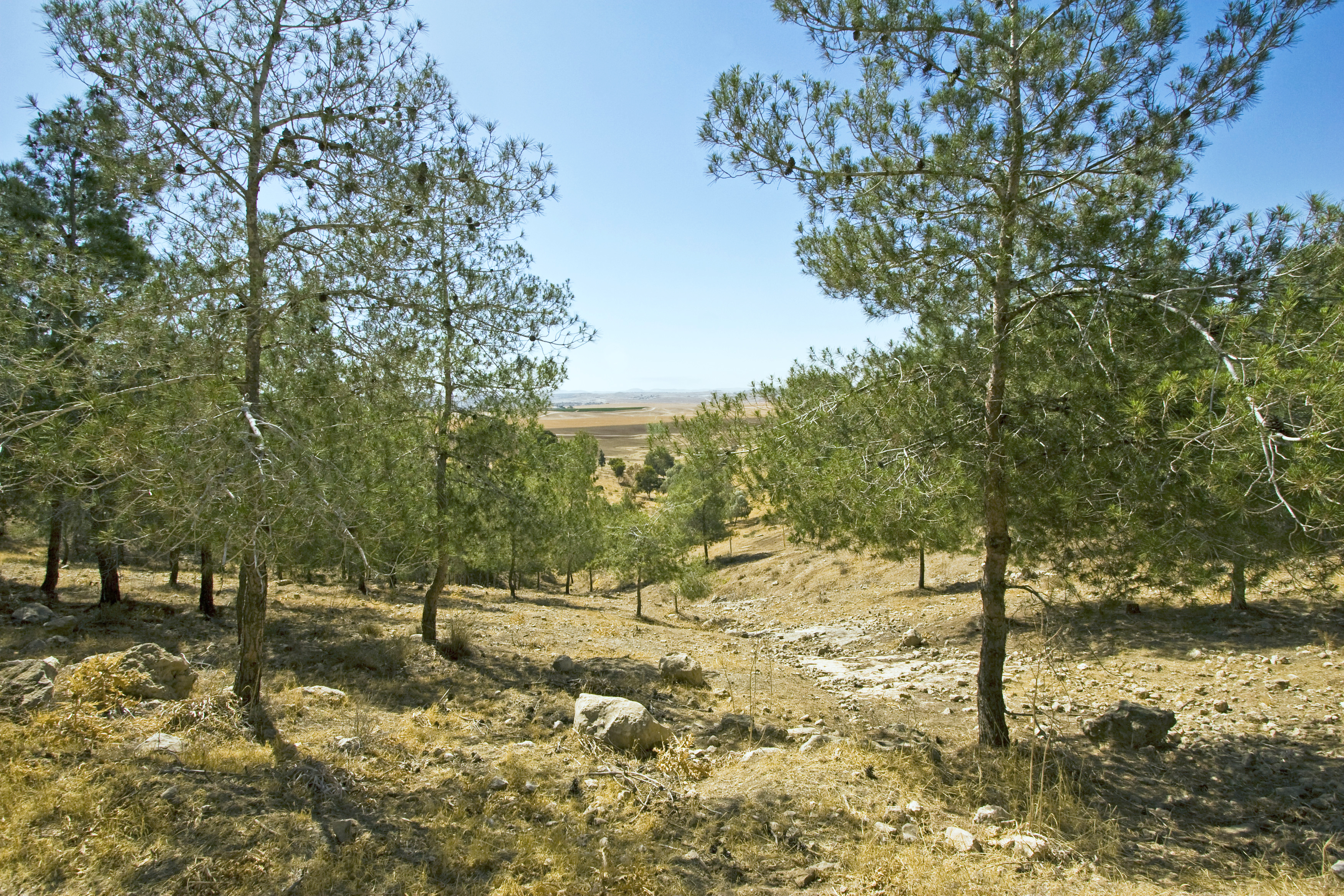

- Location within Northern Negev region of Israel Location within Israel
- Coordinates: 31°20′9″N 34°54′1″E
- Country: Israel
- District: Southern
- Founded: 2005

Carmit (Hebrew: כרמית) is a community settlement in the northern Negev desert in Israel, within the jurisdiction of Meitar located near Kramim forest.

== History ==
The community was founded for olim from North America. A neighborhood for ultra-Orthodox Jews was also planned. In 2005 the District Planning and Building Commission of the Southern Region approved the construction of 739 housing units for Carmit's Phase A. Residents moved into the first neighborhood during 2013, with the community eventually intended to comprise over 2,500 housing units, each on an area of 1/8 acre (1/2 dunam).

Absorption to Carmit is being carried out by the Jewish National Fund, the Jewish Agency, the Meitar local council and the OR Movement that has established six new communities in the Negev, West Bank and Galilee – Sansana (West Bank, est. 1997-2000), Merchav Am, Mitzpe Ilan, Haruv (2004), Be'er Milka (2006), and Giv'ot Bar (2004).

In 2011, marketing for plots of land began.

== Gallery ==
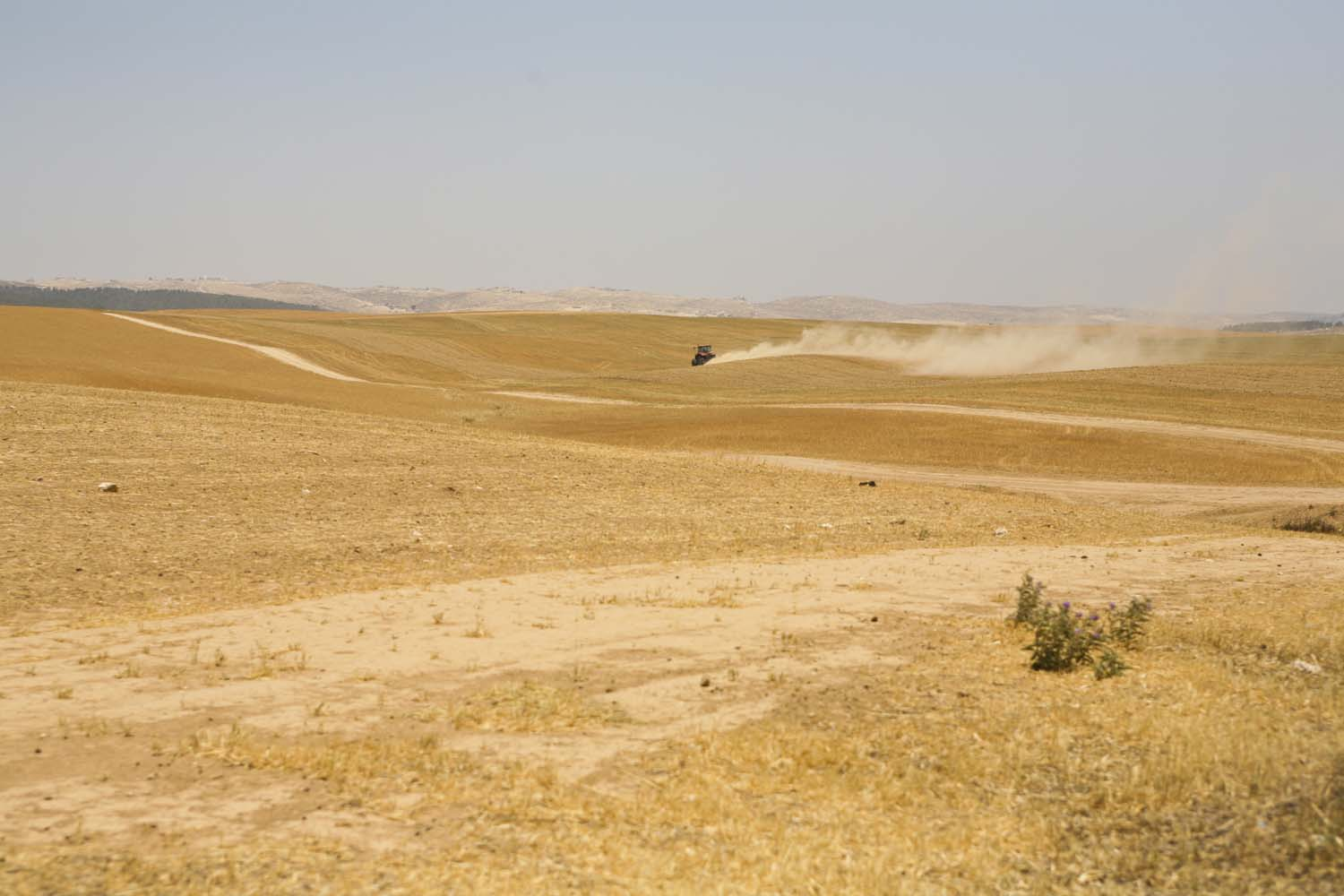

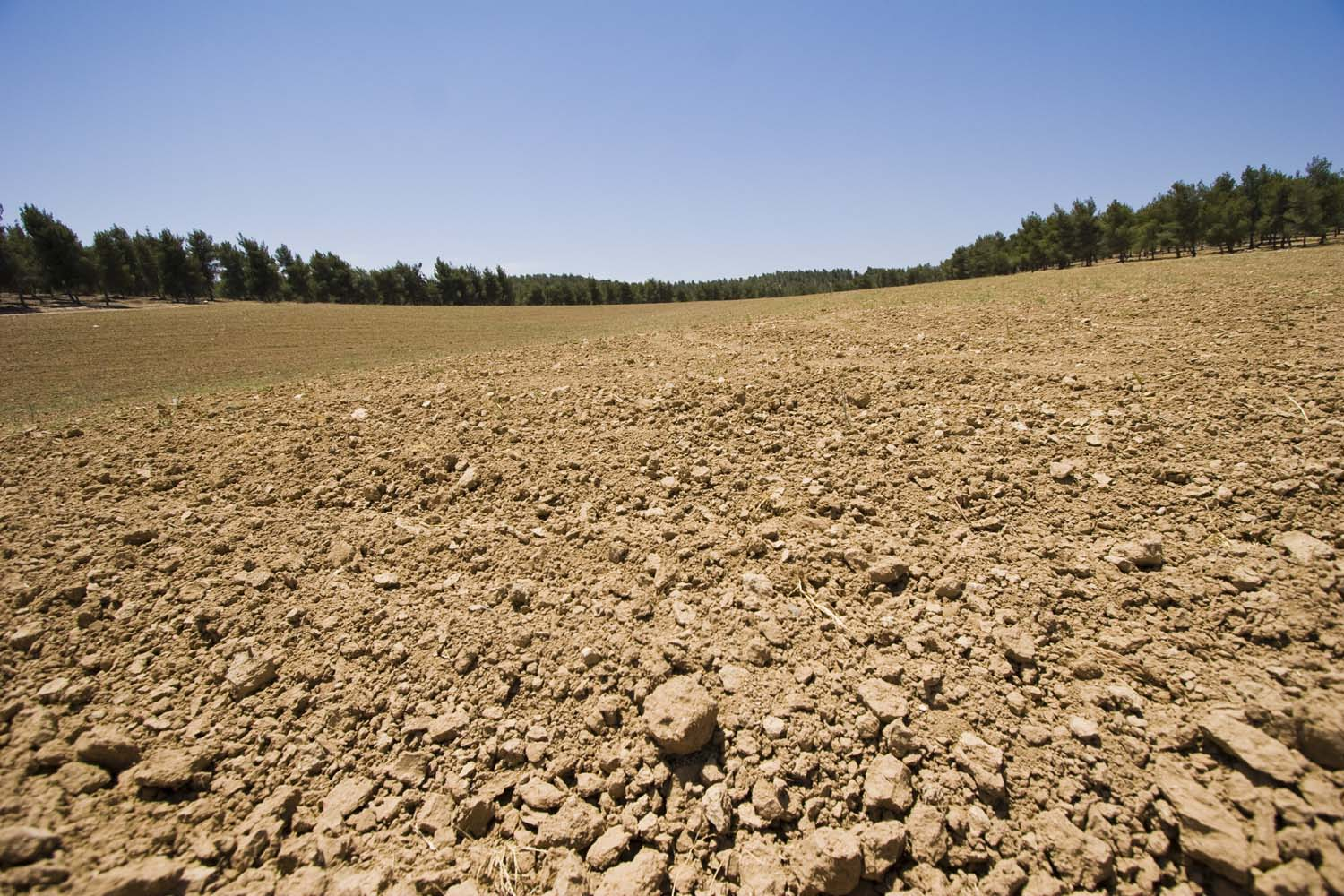

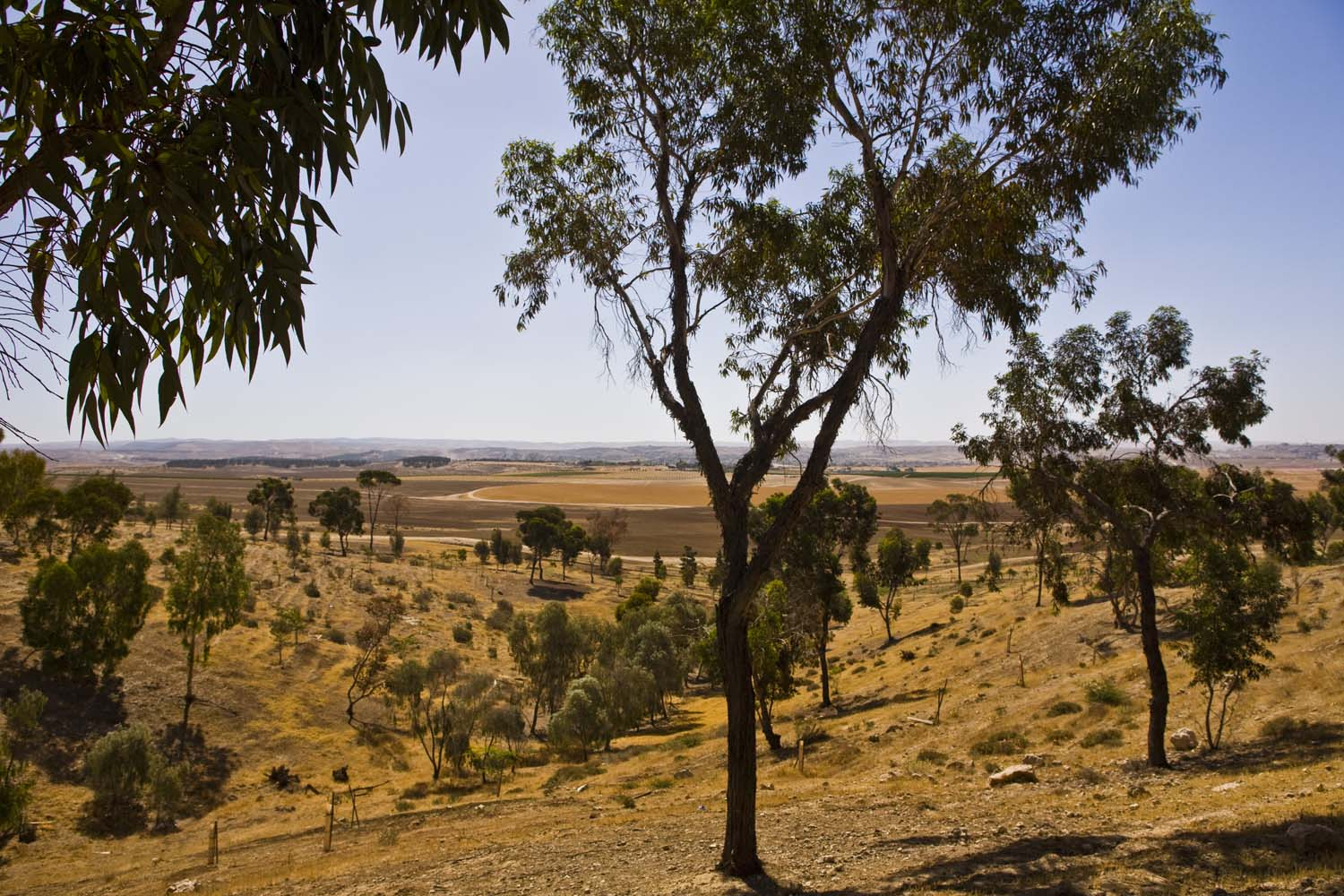

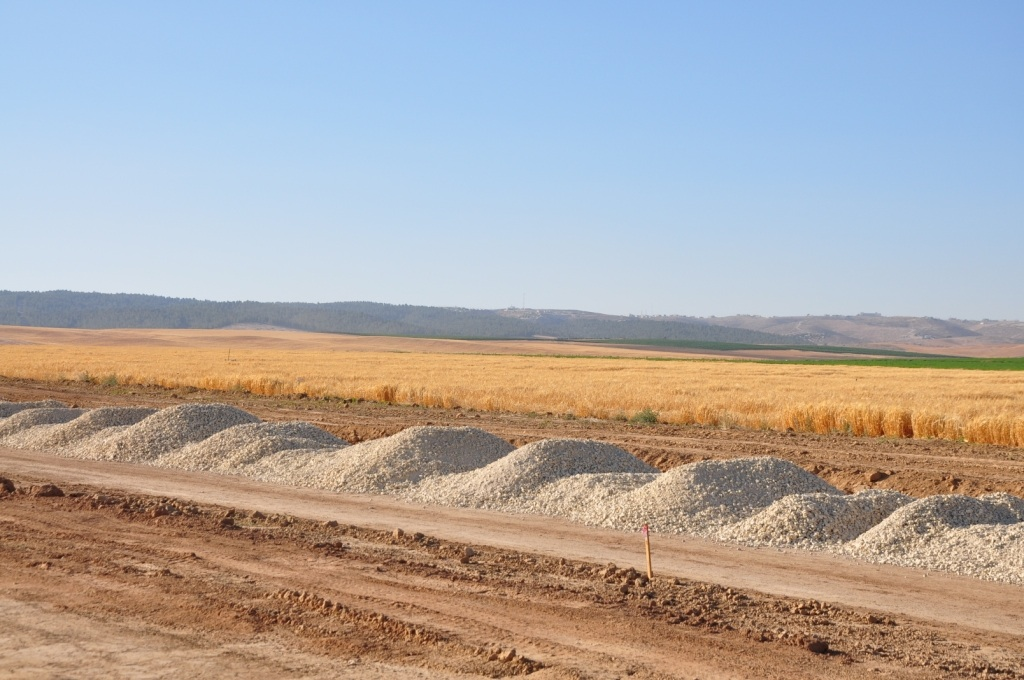

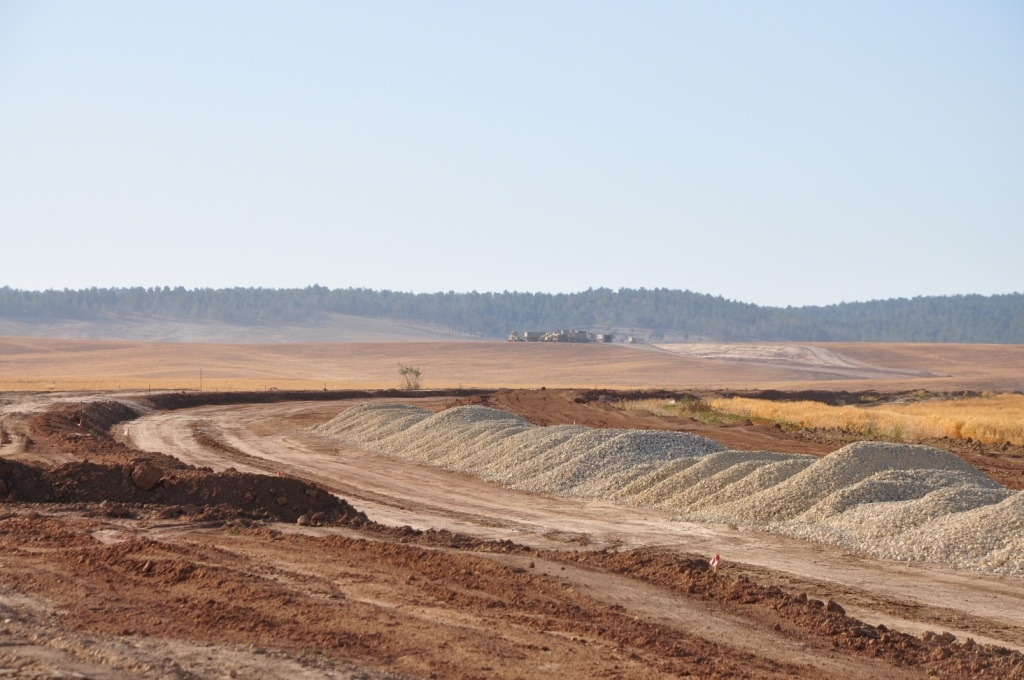
