= Desert Stars (non-profit) =

- Formation: 2013
- Headquarters: Lahav, Israel
- Website: https://www.desertstars.org.il/homepage-english

Desert Stars (Arabic: نجوم الصحراء, romanized: Nujūm al-ṣaḥrāʼ, Hebrew: כוכבי המדבר, romanized: Kochvi HaMidber) is an Israeli non-profit focused on developing the leadership skills of Bedouin youth and preparing them for higher education. The organization was founded in 2013, as part of a collaboration between Bedouin mayor Muhammad al-Nabari and Jewish entrepreneur, Matan Yaffe.

== History ==
In an effort to promote equality, all management positions at Desert Stars are jointly held by a Bedouin and an Israeli Jew.

Desert Stars' initially offered a yearlong boarding school program for male high school graduates in Ruhama. The program included activities like wilderness training, and lessons in Hebrew, math, and emotional intelligence from both Bedouin and Jewish instructors. As of 2018, 60 graduates participated, with plans to expand the program to include young women as well.

The organization later expanded, opening the Desert Stars Rawafed Empowerment Center, an after-school center which offers volunteering opportunities, clubs, art programs, and sports teams.

In 2016, the group opened a co-ed "leadership high school," with 210 students from multiple Bedouin tribes.

The organization plans to open Israel's first Bedouin youth village, the Jusidman Campus for Bedouin Leadership.

== Impact ==
As of 2019, around 80% of high schoolers involved with Desert Stars earned a full matriculation diploma, and as of 2023, 70% of graduates went on to higher education, with very few dropping out.

Desert Star alumni have received media attention for their community work, as in 2021 when a group of 20 alumni repaired a Jewish cemetery after it was vandalized by other Bedouin youth.

== Awards ==
In 2018, the organization received the Israeli Hope Prize.

In 2019, the organization received the Zusman-Joint Distribution Committee Prize.

In 2023, co-founders al-Nabari and Yaffe received the IIE Victor J. Goldberg Prize for their work with Desert Stars.
