= Kramim =

Kibbutz in southern Israel

Kramim: כְּרָמִים (Hebrew)
- Etymology: Vineyards
- Location within Northern Negev region of Israel
- Coordinates: 31°20′1″N 34°55′7″E
- Country: Israel
- District: Southern
- Subdistrict: Beersheba
- Council: Bnei Shimon
- Affiliation: Kibbutz Movement
- Founded: 1980
- Founder: Hashomer Hatzair Members
- Population (2024): 601

Kramim (Hebrew: כְּרָמִים, lit. 'Vineyards') is a kibbutz in southern Israel. Located around a kilometer west of Meitar, it falls under the jurisdiction of Bnei Shimon Regional Council. In 2024 it had a population of 601.

== History ==
The kibbutz was founded in 1980 by an urban society group organized by the Kibbutz Movement.

== Economy ==
The kibbutz grows peaches, potatoes, carrots, garlic, peppers and wheat in collaboration with kibbutz Lahav and kibbutz Shomria, and has recently planted olive orchards alongside its wine-grape vineyards. Kibbutz industries also operates Gan HaKramim Country Lodging and a chicken coop. Enlight Renewable Energy entered a leasing agreement with Kibbutz Kramim to build a 5 megawatt photo-voltaic solar field on the kibbutz's land.
