= Moshavei Yahdav =

Coordinates: 31°22′31″N 34°38′13″E

The Moshavei Yahdav (Hebrew: מושבי יחדיו, lit. the Together Moshavim) is a group of three moshavim located in the north-western Negev desert between Netivot and Ofakim and under the jurisdiction of Bnei Shimon Regional Council. They are:

- Brosh (lit. "Cypress")
- Ta'ashur (lit. "Larch")
- Tidhar (lit. "Plane tree")

The three moshavim were all established in 1953 by Moroccan immigrants and refugees who were members of the Bnei Moshavim movement. They are all named after a passage from the Book of Isaiah, specifically Isaiah 41:19:

I will plant in the wilderness the cedar, the acacia-tree, and the myrtle, and the oil-tree; I will set in the desert the cypress, the plane-tree, and the larch together;

As the end, the passage describes the three trees set in the desert "together", from which the group takes its name.
