= Adanim Youth Village =

Youth village in southern Israel

Adanim: עדנים (Hebrew)
- Location within Northwest Negev region of Israel
- Coordinates: 31°26′15″N 34°45′36″E
- Country: Israel
- District: Southern
- Council: Bnei Shimon
- Founded: 2007

Adanim Youth Village (Hebrew: כפר נוער עדנים, Kfar No'ar Adanim) is a youth village in the northwestern Negev desert of southern Israel. Located close to Beit Kama, it is within the borders of Bnei Shimon Regional Council.

The youth village was established in 2007 and houses a boarding school catering for around 60 pupils age 12 to 18 with mental and emotional difficulties. It is under the jurisdiction of the Ministry of Welfare and Social Services.
