= Yonatan Shamriz =

Israeli social and political activist

- יונתן שמריז
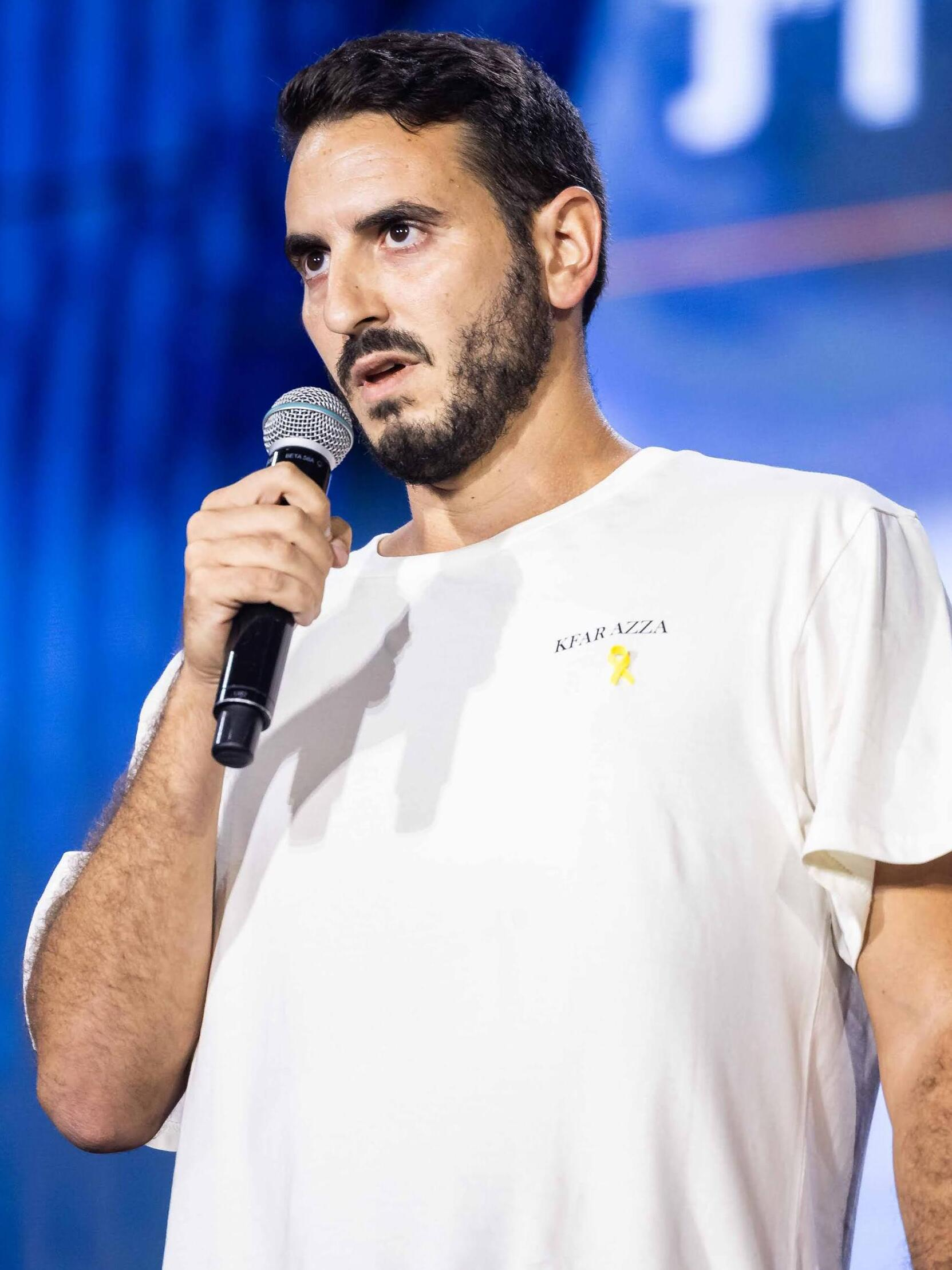
- Yonatan Shamriz
- Born: January 1, 1990 (age 36); Mishmar HaNegev
- Known for: Social activism

Yonatan Shamriz (Hebrew: יונתן שמריז; born January 1, 1990) is an Israeli social activist and founder of the "Kumu" (Awaken) movement, a national grassroots movement he founded with families affected by the October 7 attacks.

== Biography ==
Shamriz was born in Mishmar HaNegev to Dikla, a kindergarten teacher, and Avi Lulu Shamriz, an immigrant from Iran, an accountant and businessman. In 1993, the family moved to Kibbutz Kfar Aza. He attended the Shaar Negev Regional High School. In the army, Shamriz served in the Coordination of Government Activities in the Territories Unit as a course sergeant. He graduated with a bachelor's degree in business administration and politics and government from Ben-Gurion University of the Negev and an additional bachelor's degree in law from Sapir College. In 2014, Shamriz founded the "Generation of Qassams" movement, a movement that sought to raise awareness of the security dangers in the Gaza parameter and present them as a broad national problem. Together with his brothers Ido and Alon, they founded the "Avsha - Packaging Solutions" factory in Kibbutz Saad. On October 7, when a surprise attack began on the settlements in the encirclement, Shamriz barricaded himself with his pregnant wife and two-year-old daughter in the safe room for more than 20 hours.

Shamriz was selected to The Marker Magazine's and Ice Magazine's 40 Most Promising Young People list for 2024 and was included in Calcalist's list of 100 most influential people that same year.

On November 6, 2025, it was announced that Shamriz had decided to join politics.

== Activities for the return the hostages ==
Alon, Shamriz' younger brother, was one of the hostages in the Hamas attack on Israel in October 2023. Following the kidnapping, Shimriz became a central figure in the struggle to free the hostages. He met with leaders in Israel and around the world, including speaking at the United States Congress, to exert diplomatic pressure on the terrorist organization Hamas to release the hostages. Shamriz met with the president of the Red Cross and the prime minister and president of the European Union to pressure Qatar and Hamas to lead to an immediate deal to free the hostages.

=== The struggle for recognition and commemoration of his brother Alon as an IDF fallen soldier ===
Alon, who was held hostage in Gaza, escaped from his captors with two other abductees, Yotam Haim and Samer Al-Talalka. The three survived for five days in the heart of a bombed neighborhood in the Shaja'iyya neighborhood and were eventually accidentally killed by IDF forces on December 15, 2023. Alon was called up for reserve duty on the morning of October 7 along with his comrades in the Yahalom unit, and his family therefore demanded that he be recognized as an IDF fallen soldier. After the IDF refused, the family launched a fight to have him recognized. As part of the fight, the family petitioned the Supreme Court.

=== "Alon, my brother, the hero" ===
"Alon, My Brother, The Hero" (2024) is an Israeli documentary film directed by Omri Koren. The film, which began as a final project at the Sam Spiegel Film and Television School, documents the Shamriz family's struggle to return their son Alon, who was kidnapped to Gaza on October 7, 2023. The film focuses on Yonatan, who is the eldest brother, and documents his journey with the family in an attempt to secure Alon's release, including participation in demonstrations and meetings with various parties in Israel and around the world. The film's title is taken from Yonatan's label of his brother in his phone contact list. The story reaches a crisis point upon receiving the news of Alon's death, and ends with the circumcision ceremony of Yonatan's son, which was held three weeks later.

== The "Kumu" movement ==
In 2024, Shamriz founded the "Alon Foundation - for Building an Exemplary State," whose goals include commemorating Alon by changing the discourse in Israeli society and fostering ethical and unifying leadership to reform the state and public service at the local and national levels.

As part of the association's activities, the "Kumu" (Awaken) movement was established. Since the movement's establishment, its members have worked extensively on behalf of communities and children in the surrounding areas and the north in the areas of education, health, and security and logistical assistance, such as school protection and transportation for students. The movement's founders formed an education forum in collaboration with several university heads in Israel to help with the plight of tens of thousands of children in the north who were left without an educational framework. They also initiated collaborations with centers of excellence that will be opened in the north and south in collaboration with the Weizmann Institute, designed to provide an educational response to children evacuated during the war. In addition, the movement organizes events, conferences, and lectures throughout the country in an attempt to restore trust between citizens and the state. Shamriz, Shirel Hogeg, and Omri Shafroni, who grew up in the communities of the Gaza parameter, Kfar Aza, Ofakim, and Be'eri during those years, but did not know each other before the October 7 attack, were among the initiators of the national memorial ceremony of the families of October 7, at which Shamriz gave a speech that aroused many echoes. In his speech, Shamriz called for the establishment of a national commission of inquiry, for the return of the hostages, and for the building and repair of the state by the new generation that emerged from the fracture of the October 7 attack.

== Personal life ==
Shamriz is married with two children
