= Ta'ashur =

Moshav in southern Israel

Ta'ashur: תְּאַשּׁוּר (Hebrew)

Hebrew transcription(s)
  - Standard: Te'ashur
- Etymology: Larch
- Location within Northwest Negev region of Israel
- Coordinates: 31°22′20″N 34°38′38″E
- Country: Israel
- District: Southern
- Subdistrict: Beersheba
- Council: Bnei Shimon
- Affiliation: Moshavim Movement
- Founded: 1953
- Founder: Moroccan Jewish immigrants
- Population (2024): 462

Ta'ashur (Hebrew: תְּאַשּׁוּר, lit. 'Larch') is a moshav in southern Israel. Located in the north-western Negev between Ofakim and Netivot, it falls under the jurisdiction of Bnei Shimon Regional Council and covers an area of around 1,200 dunams. In 2024 it had a population of 462.

== History ==
The moshav was established in 1953 by Moroccan Jewish immigrants and refugees. Its name is taken from the Book of Isaiah, specifically Isaiah 41:19:

I will plant in the wilderness the cedar, the acacia-tree, and the myrtle, and the oil-tree; I will set in the desert the cypress, the plane-tree, and the larch together;

Two other nearby moshavim, Brosh (cypress) and Tidhar (plane-tree) take their name from this passage and the three of them are known as the Moshavei Yahdav (lit. the "Together Moshavim").
