= Matan Yaffe =

Israeli social activist and entrepreneur

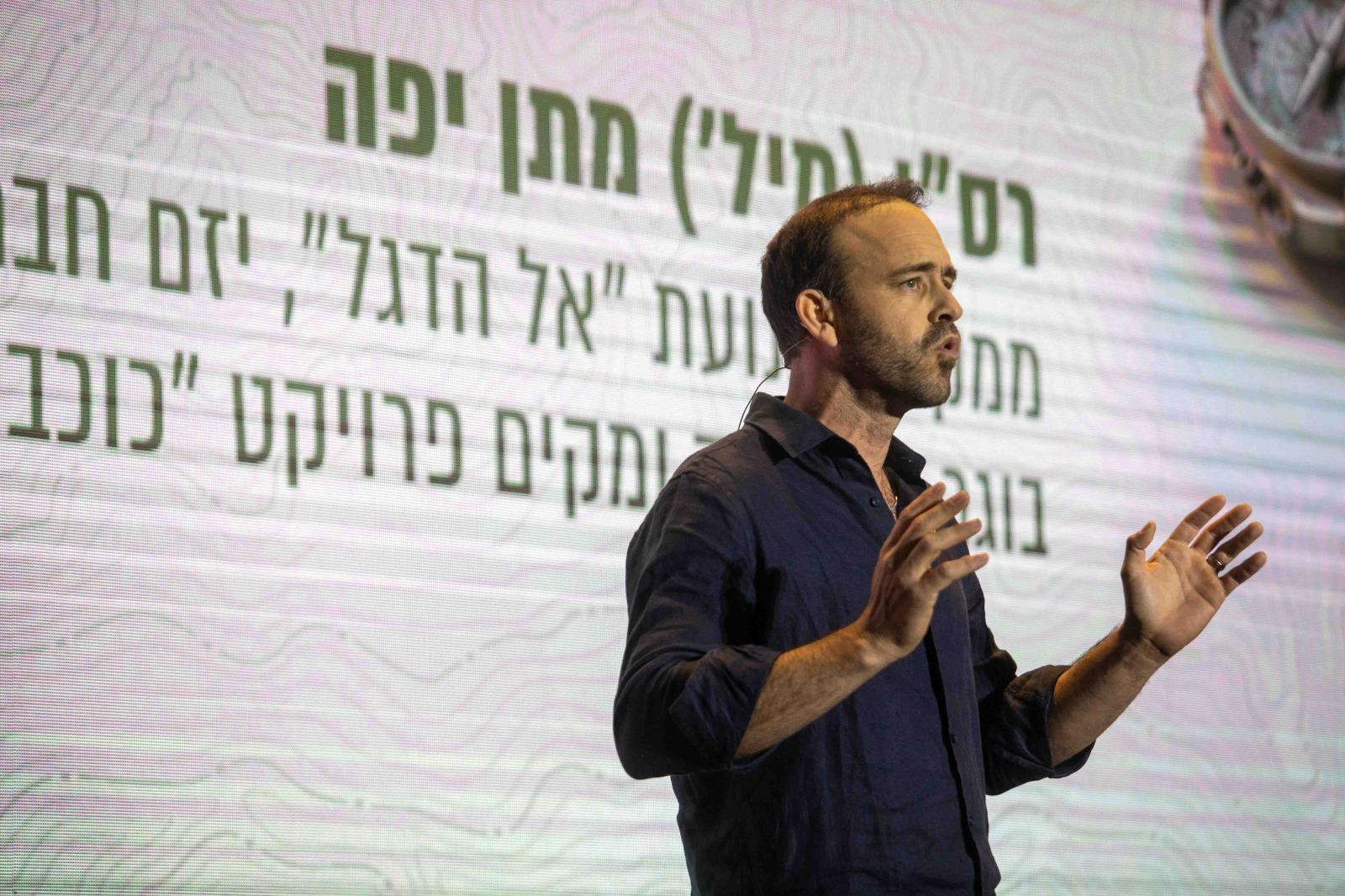
Matan Yaffe

Matan Yaffe (born October 5, 1984) is an Israeli social activist and entrepreneur, serving as the chairman of the "Shoresh Foundation" and a member of the leadership of the Zionist organization "El HaDegel."

Yaffe holds the Major (res.) rank in the Commando Brigade and is the founder of the "Desert Stars" organization. This non-profit operates a pioneering program for developing and empowering leadership among Bedouin youth. He served as the organization's CEO from 2012 to 2022.

== Social activity and community contribution ==
In 2013, Yaffe and Dr. Mohammad Alnabari founded the "Desert Stars" organization to nurture a new generation of young Bedouin leaders, integrating them as an inseparable part of Israeli society. The idea to establish "Desert Stars" emerged after the birth of his first son, when Yaffe realized that the lifestyle of Jewish settlements in the Negev—fortifying themselves behind fences and walls against Bedouin residents—was unsustainable. To ensure security and tranquility for Negev residents, he believed promoting the Bedouin society and providing its youth with the same opportunities available to Jewish youth in Israel was essential. At that point, Yaffe initiated a series of meetings with Bedouin figures, educators, politicians, and local government officials to study the issue and propose innovative, creative, and effective solutions.

In June 2022, Matan Yaffe moved to Boston, Massachusetts, to pursue a Master’s in Public Administration at Harvard University's Kennedy School of Government. During his studies, he and two fellow Israeli students proposed a class project emphasizing Israel as a liberal Jewish democracy. Their professor found the theme offensive, comparing "Jewish democracy" to "White supremacy," and demanded they change their topic. When the students refused, they faced marginalization and received lower grades. Feeling discriminated against, Yaffe and his peers filed a complaint against Harvard, alleging a hostile learning environment. An independent investigation confirmed these claims. Yaffe and his friends filed an official complaint and sued Harvard with the assistance of Brandeis Center. In January 2025, Harvard settled the lawsuit by adopting the International Holocaust Remembrance Alliance's definition of antisemitism and committing to measures ensuring a welcoming environment for Jewish and Israeli students.

At the end of summer 2023, Yaffe returned to Israel with his family. Shortly thereafter, following the outbreak of the October 7 war, he was called up for reserve duty, serving for 300 days in the Commando Brigade.
