= Eliezer Rafaeli =

Founding president of the University of Haifa

- אליעזר רפאלי
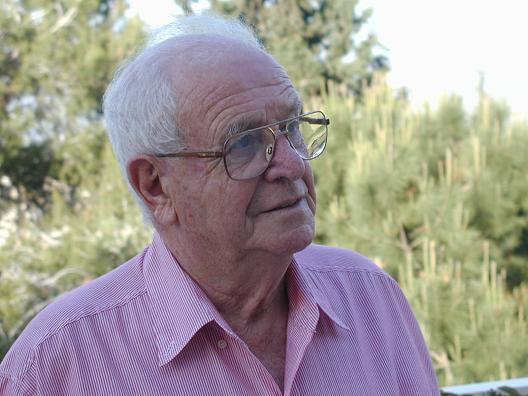
- Eliezer Rafaeli
- Born: 18 September 1926; Tel Aviv, Mandatory Palestine
- Died: 27 May 2018 (aged 91)
- Resting place: Degania Bet, Israel
- Known for: founding President of the University of Haifa

Eliezer Rafaeli (Hebrew: אליעזר רפאלי; September 18, 1926 – May 27, 2018) was the Israeli founding President of the University of Haifa.

== Biography ==
Rafaeli was born in Tel Aviv, Mandatory Palestine. He was in the Palmach from 1944 to 1948, and in the Israel Defense Forces from 1948 to 1951. He lived in Kibbutz Mishmar Hanegev from 1946 to 1952, and Kibbutz Maagan Michael from 1952 to 1957.

He taught at The New School for Social Research from 1957 to 1959, and at Columbia University from 1960 to 1963.

Rafaeli was the founding President of the University of Haifa from 1973 to 1977.

In 2000, Rafaeli was the Chancellor of the University of Haifa, and founder of its Jewish-Arabic Center.

Rafaeli died on May 27, 2018, and was buried in Degania Bet, Israel.
