= Kamada Ltd. =

Pharmaceutical company

- Company type: Public
- Traded as: TASE: KMDA; Nasdaq: KMDA
- Industry: Pharmaceutical
- Founded: 1990; 36 years ago
- Headquarters: Rehovot, Israel
- Key people: Lilach Asher Topilsky (chairman of the board); Amir London (CEO)
- Products: Cytogam, KamRAB, Hepagam B, WinRho SDF, Varizig, Glassia
- Number of employees: 450 (2024)
- Website: kamada.com

Kamada Ltd. is a global biopharmaceutical company specializing in the research, manufacturing, and commercialization of specialty pharmaceuticals derived from human plasma.

The company’s portfolio includes 6 FDA-approved plasma-derived products, which are distributed in over 30 international markets.

The company's headquarters and laboratories are located in the park of Kiryat Weizmann Institute of Science in Rehovot, Israel. The production facility is located in Kibbutz Beit Kama, Israel. The company also has offices in the United States, located in Hoboken, New Jersey.

== History ==
Kamada was founded in 1990 by David Tzur, Ralph Hahn and Kamapharam Ltd., which was wholly owned by Kibbutz Beit Kama, until then Kamapharam was producing albumin, and its production facilities were acquired in full by Kamada In 1999, (35%) to a company owned by Hahn and another investor for $2.5 million. Hahn and Tzur headed the company by the beginning of 2013. The company completed its first public offering in 2005 on the Tel Aviv Stock Exchange.

Today, the company specializes in the development, manufacture and marketing of proteins, especially for orphan diseases. The company produces about 10 injectable and marketed drugs in more than 15 countries around the world.

Kamada is a member of the Biomed index on the Tel Aviv Stock Exchange, and as of December 2012, its shares were included in the Tel Aviv 100 index.

In 2012, the company was ranked 456 among the 500 fastest growing companies in Europe (and 15th in Israel) according to the Deloitte Index, based on their income in 2007–2011.

In May 2014, the company announced that it had not met the target set for the trial for a hereditary emphysema in inhalation. Following the failure of the experiment, the company's market value fell within a year from $500 million to $150 million.

== Products ==
=== Glassia: Alpha-1 Antitrypsin for infusion (AAT IV) ===
Glassia is approved by the FDA to treat lung disease caused by alpha 1-antitrypsin deficiency. The active ingredient in the drug is the protein alpha-1 Antitrypsin (AAT). Glassia is indicated for patients suffering from lung disease called emphysema, due to a genetic deficiency in the AAT protein. Takeda holds the license to manufacture and distribute Glassia in the United States, Canada, Australia, and New Zealand, following a completed technology transfer from Kamada. Under the terms of the agreement between the companies, Kamada is entitled to royalties from Glassia sales in Takeda’s markets. In other countries where Glassia is available, Kamada partners with local distributors to sell the medicine.

=== Production of immunoglobulins ===
The company has developed a technological platform for the production of specific immunoglobulins (IgG's). It produces a specific antibody against the rabies virus, and a product for the treatment of HDN – disease of the newborn hemolytic (Hemolytic Disease of the Newborn) – a disease caused from Rh negative in the fetus.

The company cooperates with the Israeli Ministry of Health, in the framework of which it established a GMP standard for the production of serum against snake venom. The product is manufactured from the serum of hyper-immune horses .

The company has a strategic agreement with Kedrion Pharmaceuticals for the development and marketing of the KamRab rabies immunoglobulin in the United States.

== See also ==
- Economy of Israel
- Research and development in Israel
