= Tidhar =

Village in Israel

Tidhar: תִּדְהָר (Hebrew)
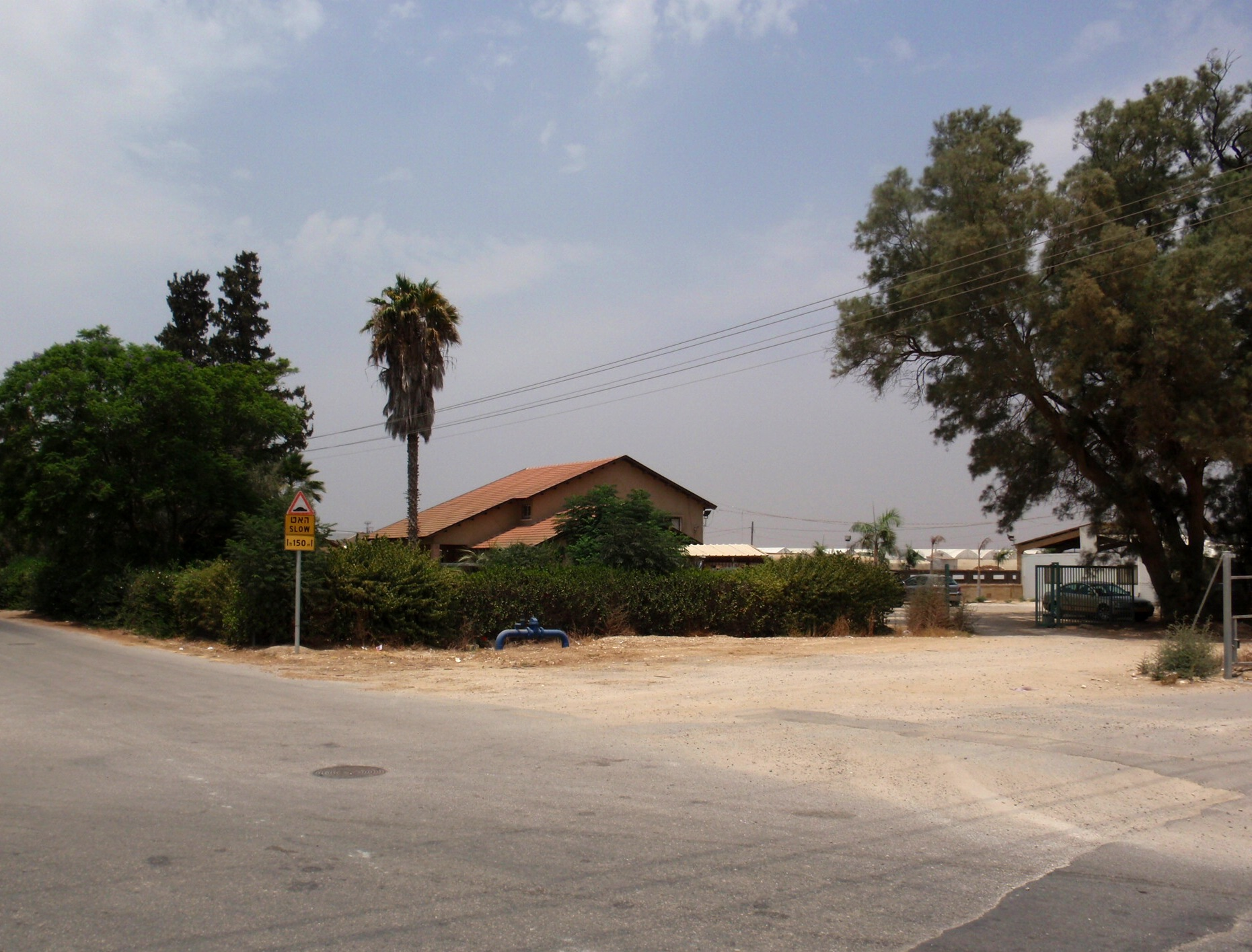
- Etymology: Plane tree
- Location within Northwest Negev region of Israel
- Coordinates: 31°22′45″N 34°37′46″E
- Country: Israel
- District: Southern
- Subdistrict: Beersheba
- Council: Bnei Shimon
- Affiliation: Moshavim Movement
- Founded: 1953
- Founder: Moroccan Jewish immigrants and refugees
- Population (2024): 816

Tidhar (Hebrew: תִּדְהָר, lit. 'Plane tree') is a moshav in southern Israel. Located in the north-western Negev between Ofakim and Netivot, it falls under the jurisdiction of Bnei Shimon Regional Council and covers an area of around 1,000 dunams. In 2024 it had a population of 816.

== History ==
The moshav was established in 1953 by Moroccan immigrants and refugees. Its name is taken from the Book of Isaiah, specifically Isaiah 41:19:

I will plant in the wilderness the cedar, the acacia-tree, and the myrtle, and the oil-tree; I will set in the desert the cypress, the plane-tree, and the larch together;

Two other nearby moshavim, Brosh (cypress) and Ta'ashur (larch) take their name from this passage and the three of them are known as the Moshavei Yahdav (lit. 'Together Moshavim').
