= Brosh, Israel =

Moshav in southern Israel

Brosh: בְּרוֹשׁ (Hebrew)
- Etymology: Cypress
- Location within Northwest Negev region of Israel
- Coordinates: 31°22′16″N 34°38′7″E
- Country: Israel
- District: Southern
- Subdistrict: Beersheba
- Council: Bnei Shimon
- Affiliation: Moshavim Movement
- Founded: 1953
- Founder: Moroccan Jews
- Population (2024): 561

Brosh (Hebrew: בְּרוֹשׁ, lit. 'Cypress') is a moshav in southern Israel. Located in the north-western Negev between Ofakim and Netivot, it falls under the jurisdiction of Bnei Shimon Regional Council. In 2024 it had a population of 561.

== Etymology ==
The name Brosh is taken from the Book of Isaiah, specifically Isaiah 41:19:

I will plant in the wilderness the cedar, the acacia-tree, and the myrtle, and the oil-tree; I will set in the desert the cypress, the plane-tree, and the larch together;

Two other nearby moshavim, Tidhar (plane-tree) and Ta'ashur (larch) take their name from this passage and the three of them are known as the Moshavei Yahdav (lit. the "Together Moshavim").

== History ==
The moshav was established in 1953, with Moroccan immigrants making up most of the founders. It houses a service centre serving all three moshavim, including a library, an after-school child care centre, a club for the elderly and a medical clinic.

In Moshav there are 60 farm houses and a community extension.

Some of the moshav's residents are engaged in agriculture - growing potatoes, turkeys, chickens and marketing eggs, etc. and some work outside the moshav.

== Notable residents ==
- Nirit Bakshi, Miss Israel 2000
