= Lahav =

Kibbutz in southern Israel

Lahav: לַהַב (Hebrew)
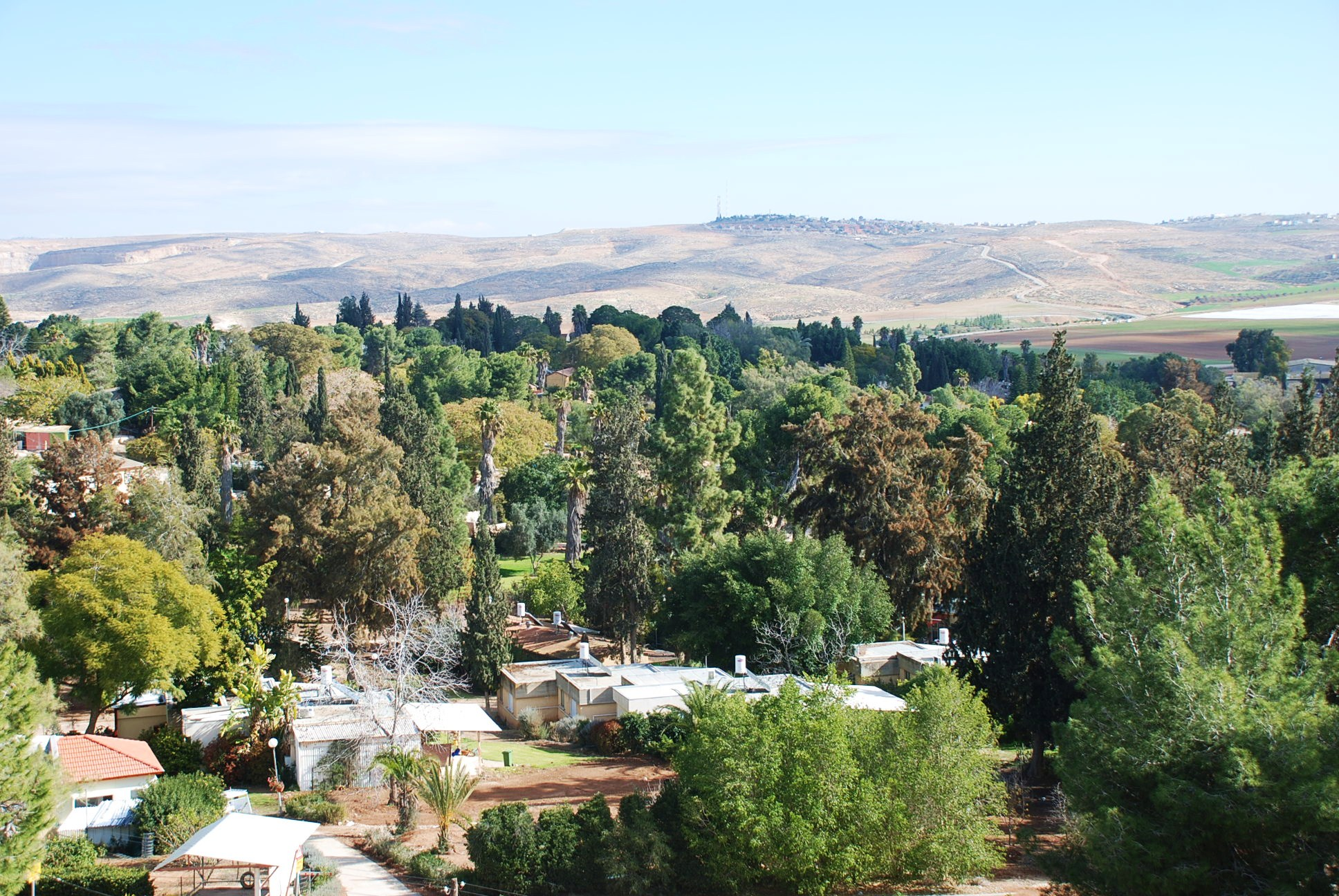
- Etymology: Blade
- Location within Northern Negev region of Israel
- Coordinates: 31°22′42″N 34°52′13″E
- Country: Israel
- District: Southern
- Subdistrict: Beersheba
- Council: Bnei Shimon
- Affiliation: Kibbutz Movement
- Founded: 1952
- Founder: Nahal
- Population (2024): 693

Lahav (Hebrew: לַהַב, lit. 'Blade') is a kibbutz in southern Israel. Located around 20 km north of Beersheba and covering 33,000 dunams, it falls under the jurisdiction of Bnei Shimon Regional Council. In 2024 it had a population of 693.

== History ==
The kibbutz was established in 1952 and was initially named Tziklag (Hebrew: צקלג) after the Biblical city of Ziklag, which was thought to have been located nearby. Originally the founders had been unsure whether to settle in the Negev or Galilee, but accepted a government decision that settling on Tel Halif (Tell el-Khuweilifeh) in the Negev was more important. After a few years, the kibbutz was renamed Lahav in honour of the Nahal group which established it.

== Climate ==
Climate data for Lahav (1991–2020)
Month	Jan	Feb	Mar	Apr	May	Jun	Jul	Aug	Sep	Oct	Nov	Dec	Year
Record high °C (°F)	27.3 (81.1)	30.6 (87.1)	36.5 (97.7)	39.1 (102.4)	43.0 (109.4)	41.9 (107.4)	41.2 (106.2)	41.0 (105.8)	42.9 (109.2)	39.6 (103.3)	33.9 (93.0)	30.4 (86.7)	43.0 (109.4)
Mean daily maximum °C (°F)	15.5 (59.9)	16.8 (62.2)	20.2 (68.4)	25.1 (77.2)	29.4 (84.9)	32.0 (89.6)	33.5 (92.3)	33.6 (92.5)	31.7 (89.1)	28.6 (83.5)	22.9 (73.2)	17.7 (63.9)	25.6 (78.1)
Daily mean °C (°F)	11.6 (52.9)	12.5 (54.5)	15.0 (59.0)	18.8 (65.8)	22.4 (72.3)	24.9 (76.8)	26.7 (80.1)	27.0 (80.6)	25.6 (78.1)	23.0 (73.4)	18.3 (64.9)	13.7 (56.7)	20.0 (68.0)
Mean daily minimum °C (°F)	7.7 (45.9)	8.2 (46.8)	9.8 (49.6)	12.5 (54.5)	15.4 (59.7)	17.9 (64.2)	19.9 (67.8)	20.4 (68.7)	19.3 (66.7)	17.3 (63.1)	13.7 (56.7)	9.7 (49.5)	14.3 (57.7)
Record low °C (°F)	0.3 (32.5)	−0.2 (31.6)	2.4 (36.3)	3.7 (38.7)	9.0 (48.2)	12.7 (54.9)	14.9 (58.8)	16.6 (61.9)	14.2 (57.6)	10.0 (50.0)	5.3 (41.5)	0.9 (33.6)	−0.2 (31.6)
Average precipitation mm (inches)	87.7 (3.45)	57.7 (2.27)	40.8 (1.61)	9.3 (0.37)	4.1 (0.16)	0.8 (0.03)	0.0 (0.0)	0.0 (0.0)	0.1 (0.00)	10.0 (0.39)	32.7 (1.29)	61.5 (2.42)	304.7 (12.00)
Average precipitation days (≥ 1.0 mm)	7.4	6.3	4.4	1.4	0.5	0.1	0.0	0.0	0.0	1.5	3.3	6.1	31.0
Source: NOAA

== Archaeology ==
=== Tell Halif ===
The ancient settlement of Tel Halif flourished at the time of ancient Egypt. It was a 3-hectare site, and it was occupied from Chalcolithic times. Also, significant Early Bronze Age remains have been found. During the Late Bronze period, an Egyptian “residence building” had been discovered. This was the period corresponding to the New Kingdom of Egypt, with several other similar sites found in this area.

Significant discoveries were made during the excavations in 1994 at the 'Silo site' in the Nahal Tillah area. Protodynastic and Early Dynastic Egyptian buildings remains and pottery vessels were found. Also, a clay seal impression was found, as well as a sherd bearing the serekh symbol of King Narmer.

The settlement continued to flourish during the Iron Age II period, when it was fortified. It was also active during the Persian period; many figurine fragments have been discovered from that time.

=== Horvat Rimmon ===
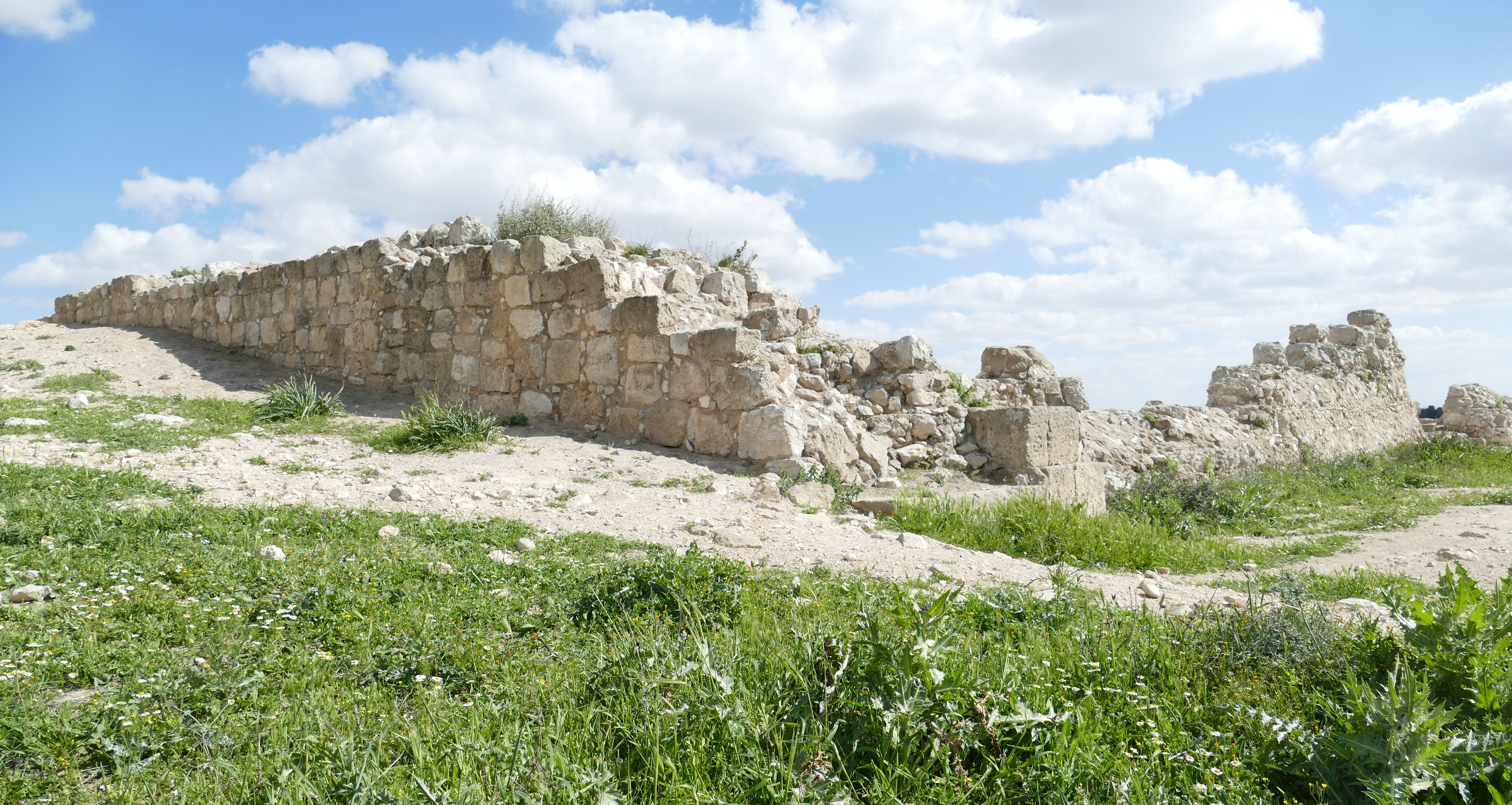
Ruins at Horvat Rimmon

Another nearby archaeological site is Horvat Rimmon (also Khirbet Umm er-Ramamin), situated about 500 metres south of Lahav, which preserves the remains of a late antique Jewish village identified with a place named "En-Rimmon" or "Eremmon," known from both rabbinic and patristic sources. The ruin, situated on a low hill 470 meters above sea level, includes multiple structures, rock-cut tombs, underground hiding complexes and rock-cut installations. Excavations at the site have revealed a multi-phase synagogue complex dating from the 3rd to 7th centuries CE, finds associated with the Bar Kokhba revolt, and a ceramic amulet inscribed with a love charm in Aramaic.

== Economy ==
The economy of Kibbutz Lahav is based on agriculture (both crops and livestock) and two industrial ventures: a plant for plastic containers (Dolav) owned and operated jointly with the neighboring kibbutz, Dvir, and a meat processing plant.

In 1963, Lahav established the Institute for Animal Research with guidance from leading scientists from the Hebrew University's Faculty of Agriculture, which is the only research facility in Israel specializing in raising pigs. According to a 1963 law, pigs can be legally raised in kibbutzim (or more generally on land leased from the state) only for research purposes, but meat from surplus animals may be sold. While all other kibbutzim abandoned pig farming to comply with the 1963 law, Lahav transferred its pig farm to its new organization, the Institute for Animal Research, which continues to supply Lahav's meat processing factory with surplus pigs. Lahav's pork and other meat products are nationally marketed in non-kosher food stores all over Israel, and the Lahav brand is a major competitor to non-kosher meat products of Mizra.
