= Bnei Shimon Regional Council =

Coordinates: 31°27′N 34°46′E

Bnei Shimon מועצה אזורית בני שמעון مجلس إقليمي بني شمعون
- Regional council (from 1951)
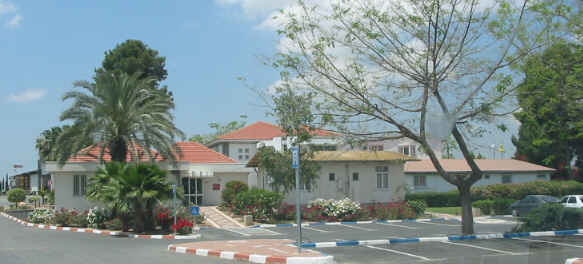
- Bnei Shimeon Regional Council offices

- Interactive map of Bnei Shimon
- Country: Israel
- District: Southern
- Subdistrict: Beersheba
- Natural region: Be'er Sheva, Gerar

Government
  - Head of Municipality: Nir Zamir

Area
  - Total: 371,180 dunams (371.18 km^{2}; 143.31 sq mi)

Population (2025)
  - Total: 12,057
  - Density: 32.483/km^{2} (84.130/sq mi)
- Website: bns.org.il

The Bnei Shimon Regional Council (Hebrew: מועצה אזורית בני שמעון, Mo'atza Azorit Bnei Shim'on, lit. Regional Council 'Sons of Shimon'), is a regional council in the northern Negev in the south of Israel. Most of its territory lies north of Beersheba and the rest bounds Beersheba on the west and east sides as well. The eastern border of this territory straddles the Green Line. It is named after the tribe of Shimon which had been allotted this region according to the Book of Joshua (19:1-9).

There are 13 communities, including seven kibbutzim, four moshavim, and two new rural towns. Four of the communities (three kibbutzim and one moshav) were established in the founding of the '11 points in the Negev' in 1946. The rest of the kibbutzim and moshavim were set up after the establishment of the State of Israel.

== Settlements ==
Kibbutzim

- Beit Kama (1949)
- Dvir
- Hatzerim (1946)
- Kramim
- Lahav
- Mishmar HaNegev (1946)
- Shoval (1946)
- Shomria (1985/2006) - former kibbutz that was modified for settlement of former Gush Katif refugees.

Moshavim

- Brosh
- Nevatim (1946)
- Taashur
- Tidhar

Community village

- Giv'ot Bar

== Institutions ==
The following institutions operate within the boundaries of the Bnei Shimon Regional Council:

- Adanim, a youth village
- Duda'im, a waste treatment centre, located on Route 25 near the HaNasi Junction
- Duda'im Environmental Protection Visitors Center
- Joe Alon Center, a Bedouin cultural museum
- Mevo'ot HaNegev, the regional high school, located in Shoval
- Nitzanei HaNegev Regional Elementary School, located in Beit Kama
- Yuvaly HaNegev Regional Elementary School, located in Giv'ot Bar

== Demographics ==
Historical population
Year	Pop.	±%
1972	2,500	—
1983	2,800	+12.0%
1995	2,700	−3.6%
2008	6,270	+132.2%
2022	11,507	+83.5%
2024	12,032	+4.6%

== Voting Patterns ==
In the 2022 election, 68 percent of voters in the regional council voted for the parties of the center-left coalition led by Yair Lapid, while 31 percent voted for the parties of the right-wing coalition led by Benjamin Netanyahu and 0.4 percent voted for the Arab parties.

In the 2026 election, 66 percent of voters in the regional council voted for the parties of the center-left coalition led by Gadi Eisenkot, while 27 percent voted for the parties of the right-wing coalition led by Benjamin Netanyahu and 0.5 percent voted for the Arab parties. An additional 3.9 percent voted for the Reservists, and 2.1 percent voted for Amcha Yisrael. Voter turnout increased 16 percent from the 2022 election.
