= Beit Kama =

Kibbutz in southern Israel

Beit Kama: בית קמה (Hebrew)
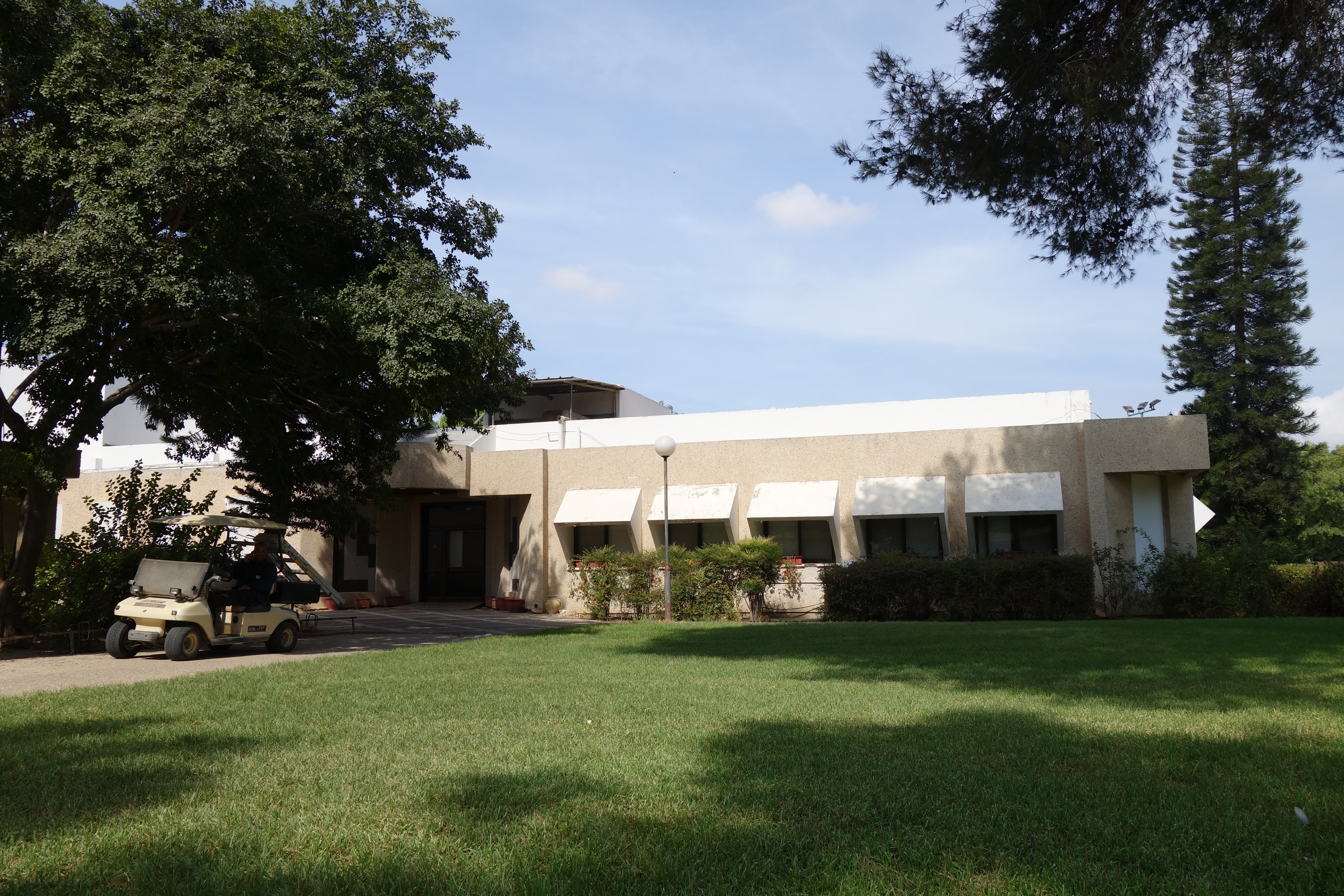
- Etymology: House of Standing Grain
- Location within Northwest Negev region of Israel Location within Israel
- Coordinates: 31°26′44″N 34°45′38″E
- Country: Israel
- District: Southern
- Subdistrict: Beersheba
- Council: Bnei Shimon
- Affiliation: Kibbutz Movement
- Founded: 18 April 1949
- Founder: Hashomer Hatzair members
- Population (2024): 1,044
- Website: www.beitkama.org.il

Beit Kama (Hebrew: בית קמה, lit. 'House of Standing Grain') is a kibbutz in the northern Negev desert in Israel. Located north of the Bedouin city of Rahat, it falls under the jurisdiction of Bnei Shimon Regional Council. In 2024 its population was 1,044.

== Etymology ==
The kibbutz was initially called "Safiach", but later became Beit Kama, a name derived from Isaiah 17:5: "And it shall be as when the reaper gathers standing grain."

== History ==
Beit Kama was founded on 18 April 1949, The founders of Beit Kama were immigrants from Hungary who belonged to Hashomer Hatzair movement. Most of them, holocaust survivors.. Along the years after foundation, the kibutz was expanded with immigrants from Argentine and Israelis who joined as Kibutz members. In the 90s a new neighborhood was founded for families that did not join as kibutz members. The kibutz members and those new families successfully created a community living together in harmony jointly operating the daily kibutz life including educational framework, gardening and neighborhood landscape development, joint swimming pool, club and dining room operation.

== Economy ==
The Kibutz own in partnership with Kibutz Mishmar Hanegev a dairy farm of about 900 milking cows and agri-cooperative of irrigated agriculture including jojoba, wheat, potatoes, pomegranate and spices such as paprika and rosemary. The kibutz is investing in electricity production from solar panel fields (currently around 300 acres) and is planning to grow further including agro-voltaic farm.

Beit Kama junction located on the highway between the center of Israel to its southern part is a resting point for drivers. The Kibutz is having shares in the cooperative operates the service area of the junction.

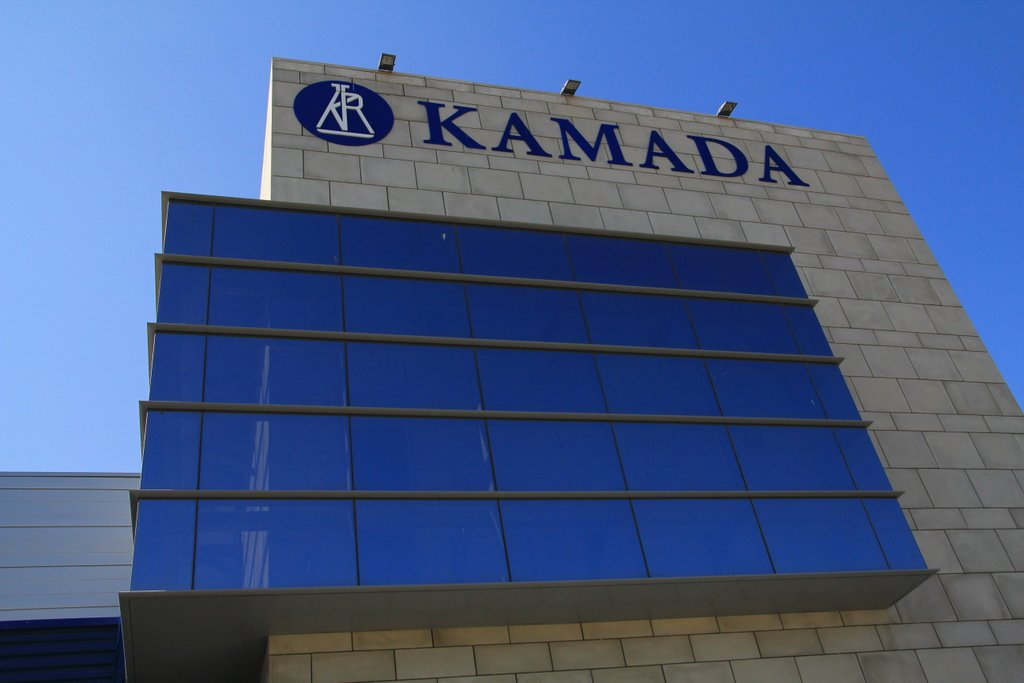
Kamada offices, Beit Kama

Kamada, a plasma-derived biopharmaceutical company, was established in Beit Kama in 1990. Its first product was human albumen. Kamada's production facilities are located at the kibbutz. The Kibutz divested his shares and does not have ownership in Kamada.

== Archaeology ==
In 2013, archaeologists of the Israel Antiquities Authority discovered a Byzantine era mosaic floor on the grounds of the kibbutz. The red, black, and yellow mosaic is decorated with images of birds, local flora and geometrical designs. An ancient water system with pools and channels was also unearthed.
