= Mishmar HaNegev =

Kibbutz in southern Israel

Mishmar HaNegev: משמר הנגב (Hebrew)
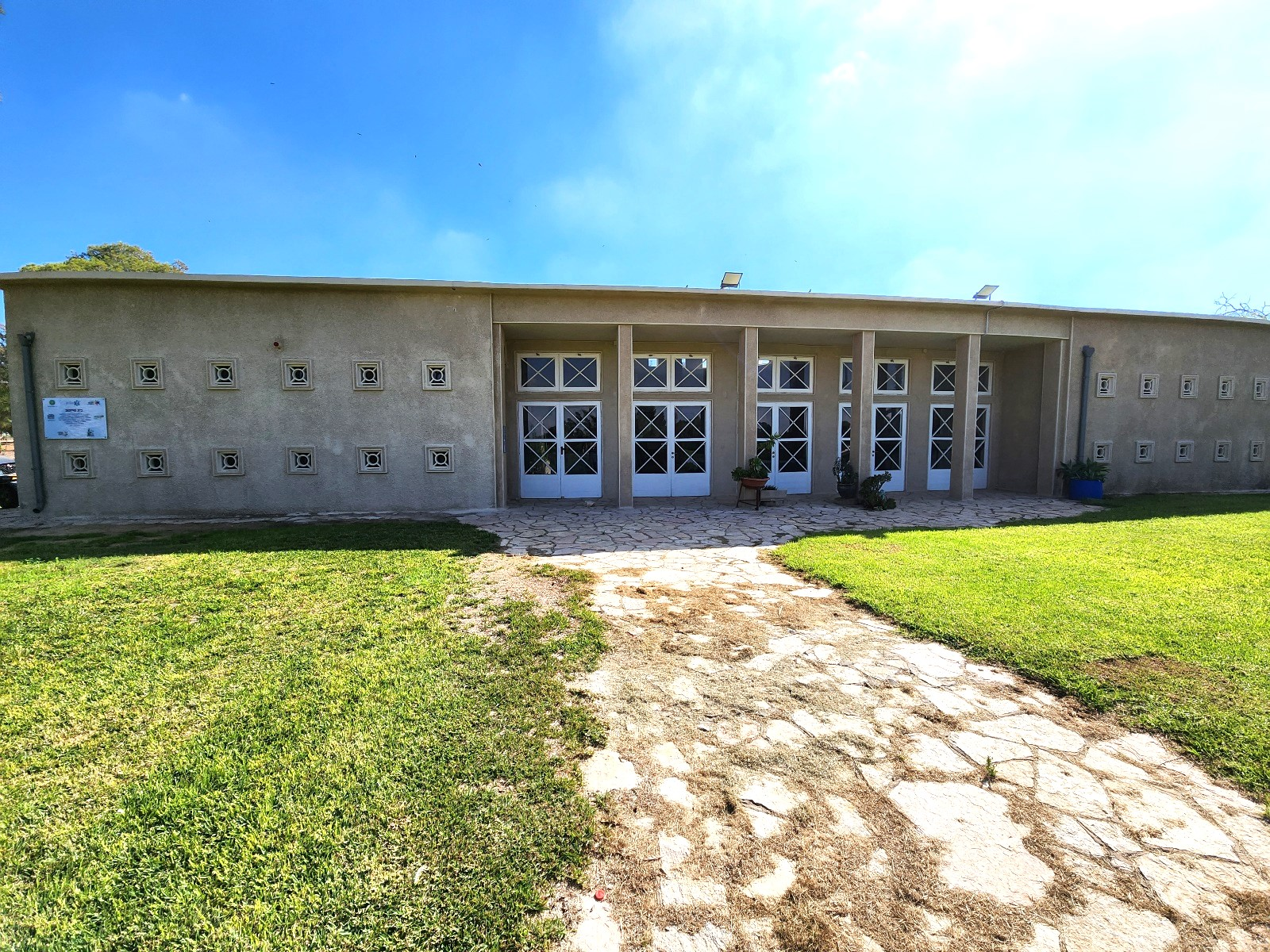
- Etymology: Guard of the Negev
- Location within Northwest Negev region of Israel Location within Israel
- Coordinates: 31°21′51″N 34°43′7″E
- Country: Israel
- District: Southern
- Subdistrict: Beersheba
- Council: Bnei Shimon
- Affiliation: Kibbutz Movement
- Founded: 6 October 1946
- Founder: Borochov movement members
- Population (2024): 1,149
- Website: atarmishmar.org.il

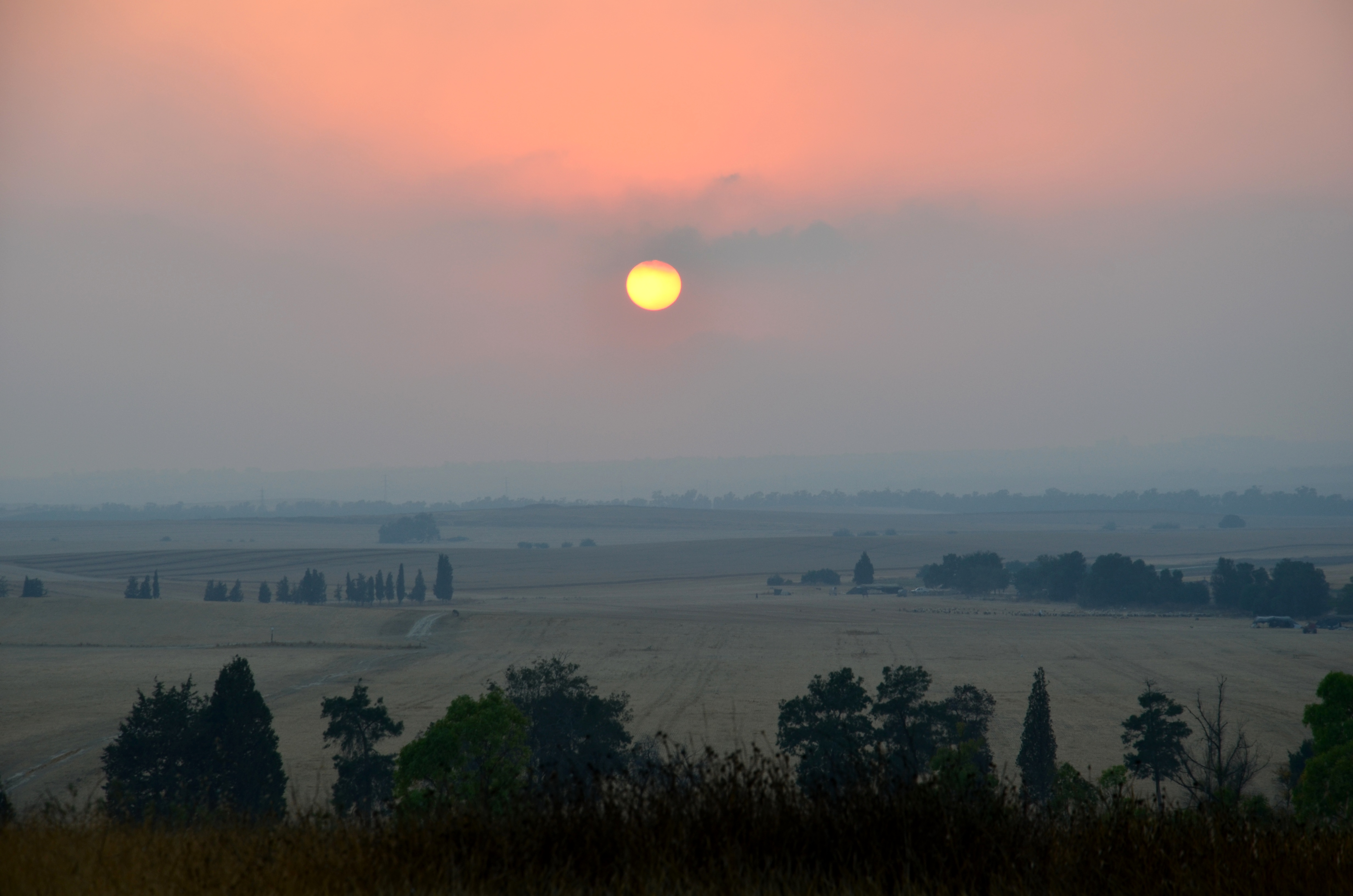
Mishmar HaNegev landscape

Mishmar HaNegev (Hebrew: משמר הנגב, lit. 'Guard of the Negev') is a kibbutz in the northern fringe of the Negev desert in southern Israel. Located on Road 264, about two kilometres south of the Bedouin city of Rahat and around ten kilometres from Beersheba, it falls under the jurisdiction of Bnei Shimon Regional Council. In 2024 its population was 1,149.

== History ==
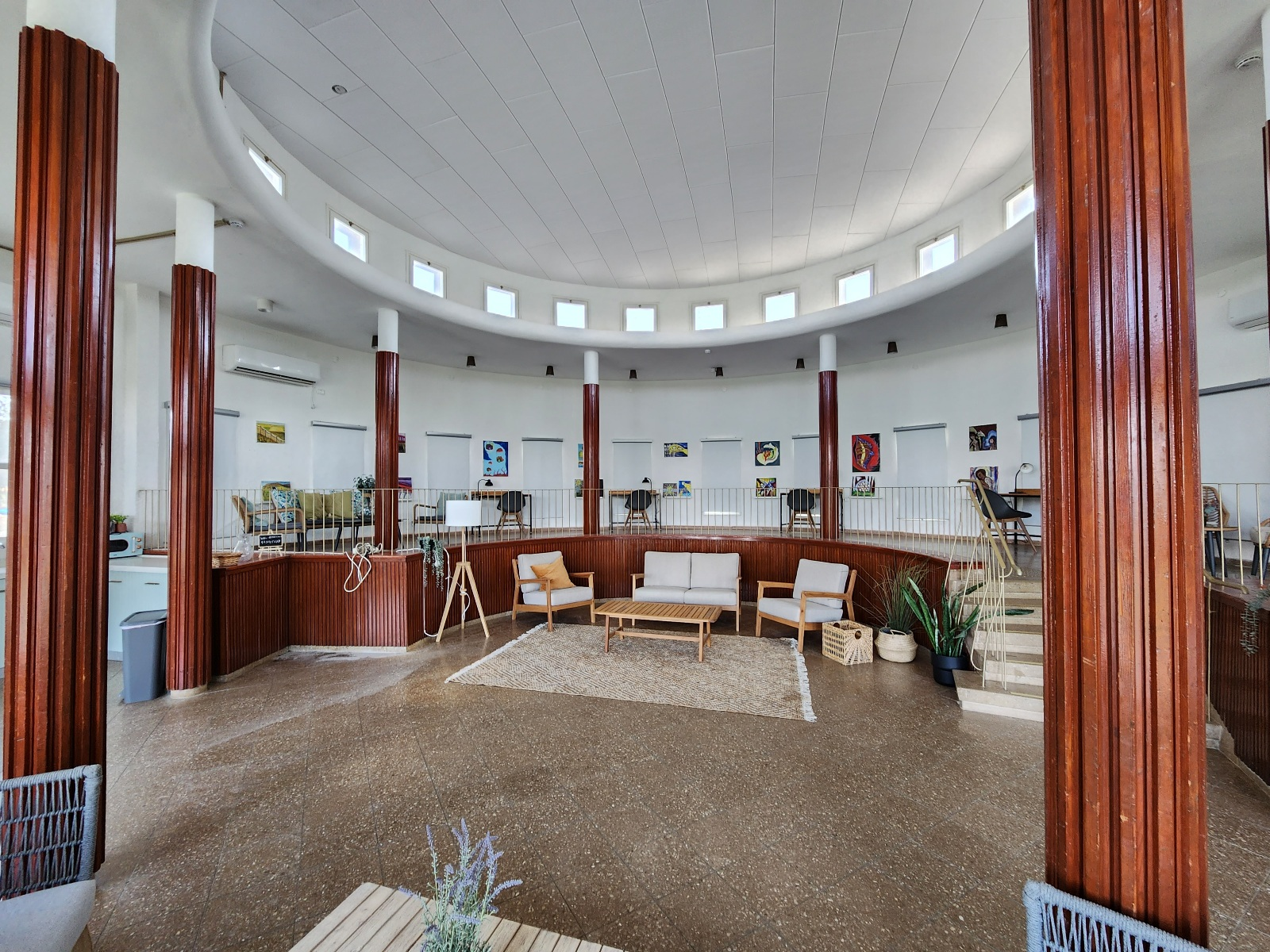
Beit Borochov

Mishmar HaNegev was founded in 1946 as one of the 11 points in the Negev settlements. It was settled by members of Borochovi Youth, a youth group affiliated with Poalei Zion, who set up camp at the site on the evening of 6 October, just after the Yom Kippur fast. In 1994 a privatisation process began in the kibbutz and in 2004 the kibbutz members voted to change the rules in favour of total privatisation.

== Economy ==
Mishmar HaNegev is the owner of Polybid Expanded Polystyrene Products, which produces insulation products for Israel and Eastern Europe. The company has an annual turnover of NIS 100 million. Mishmar HaNegev and Ecological Services Ltd. established a joint company, Negev Ecology, that operates a shredding and burial facility for tyre waste materials. The shredding mill can shred eight tons of tires an hour into 10x5cm rubber strips that are buried at a toxic waste site in southern Israel.

== Notable people ==
- Eliezer Rafaeli (1926–2018), founding president of the University of Haifa

== Gallery ==
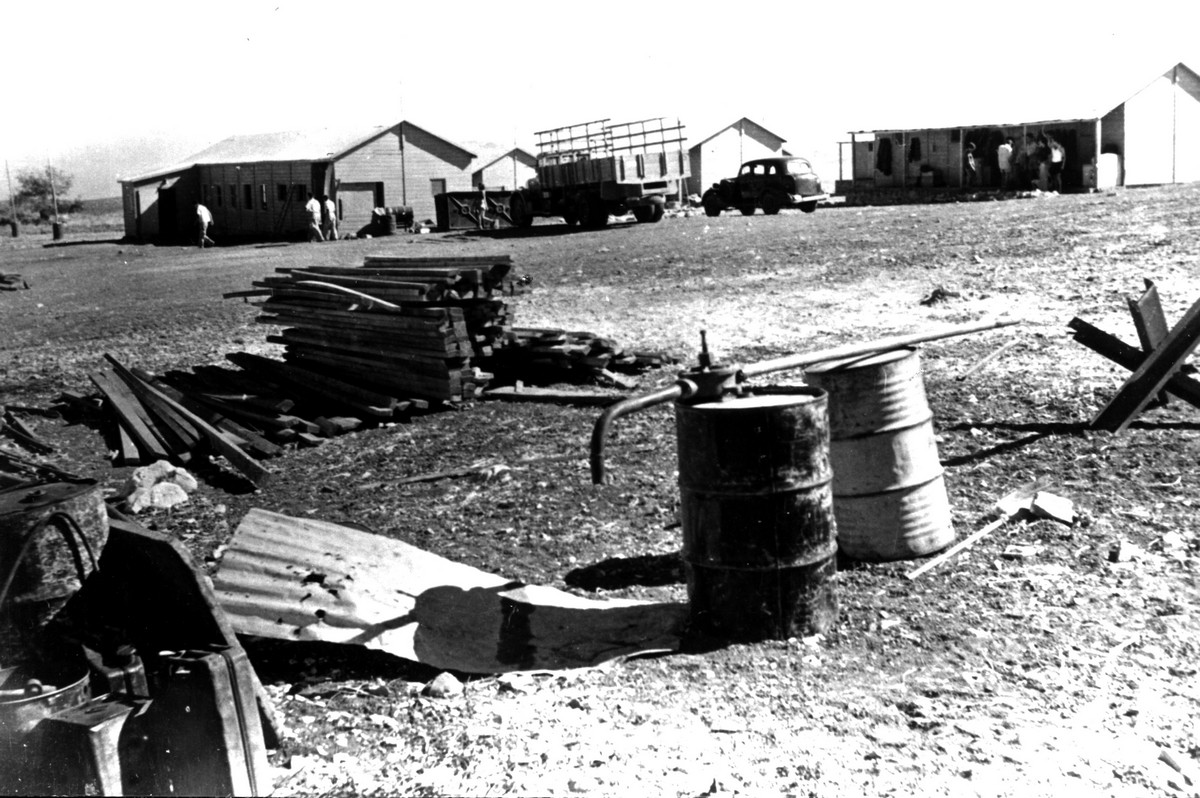
Mishmar HaNegev in 1947

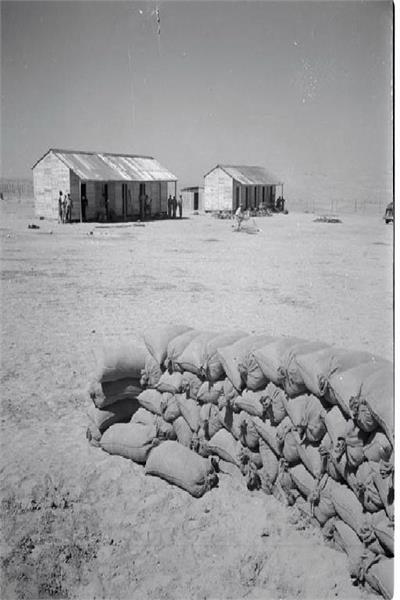
Mishmar HaNegev in 1947

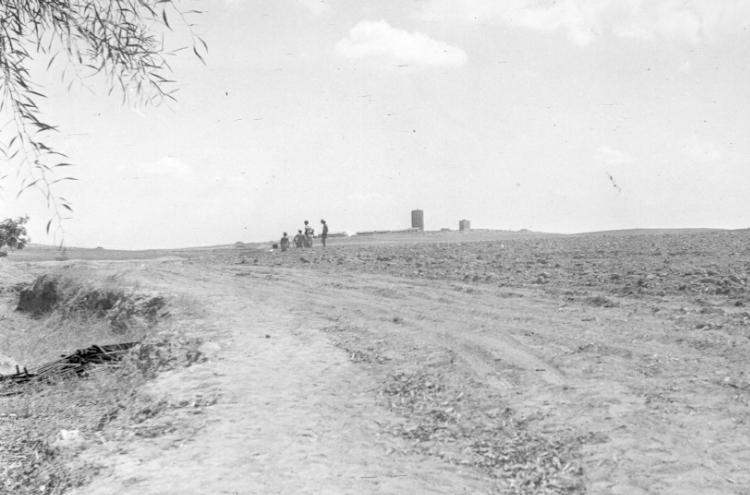
Mishmar HaNegev in 1948
