= Dvir =

Kibbutz in southern Israel

Dvir: דְּבִיר (Hebrew)
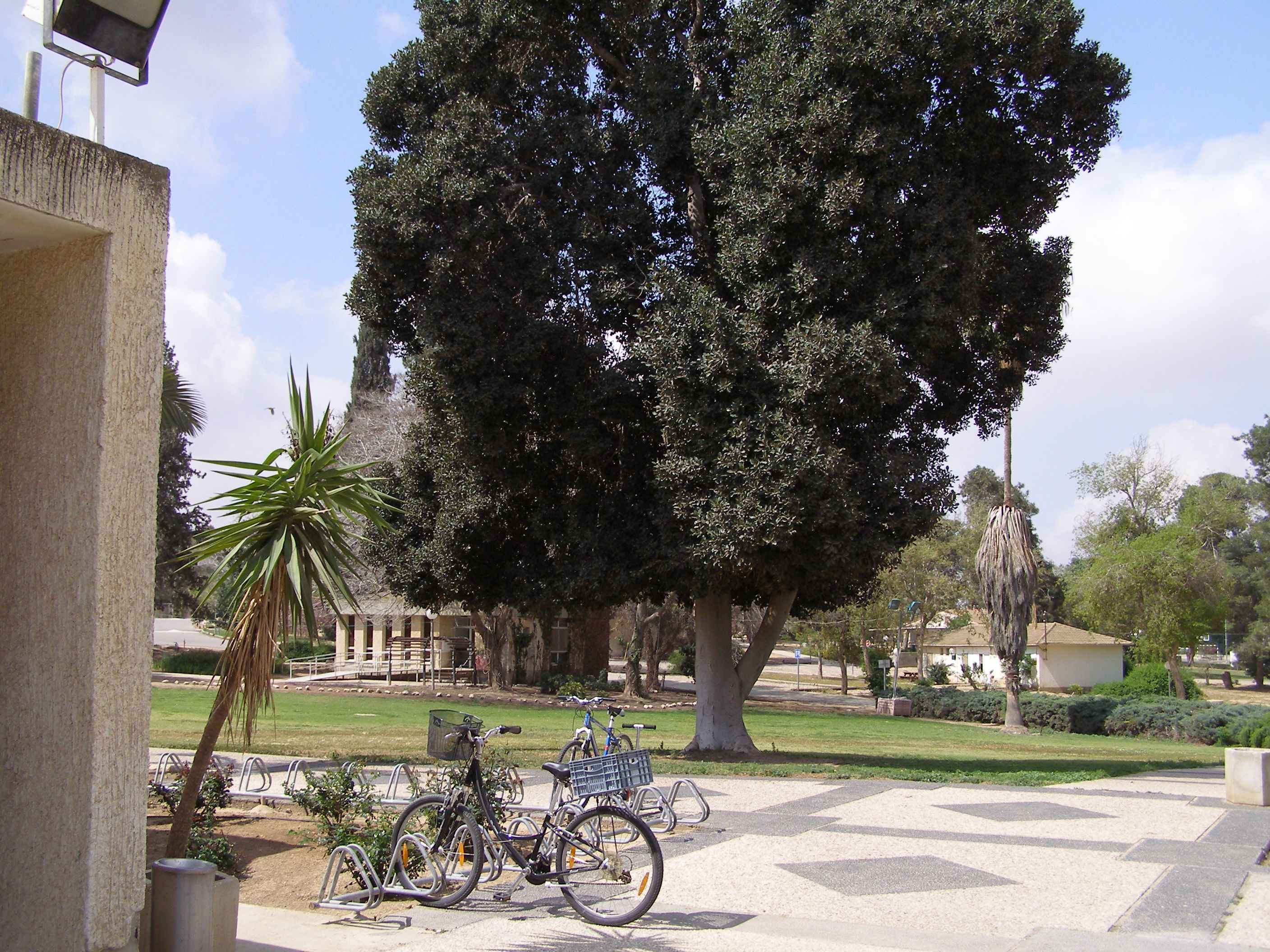

- Location within Northwest Negev region of Israel
- Coordinates: 31°24′44″N 34°49′33″E
- Country: Israel
- District: Southern
- Subdistrict: Beersheba
- Council: Bnei Shimon
- Affiliation: Kibbutz Movement
- Founded: 1951
- Founder: Hungarian Hashomer Hatzair members
- Population (2024): 1,197
- Website: dvira.org.il

Dvir (Hebrew: דְּבִיר), also known as Dvira (Hebrew: דְּבִירָה), is a kibbutz in southern Israel. Located near Rahat and Beersheba, it falls under the jurisdiction of Bnei Shimon Regional Council. In 2024 it had a population of 1,197.

== History ==
The kibbutz was established in 1951 by Hashomer Hatzair members from Hungary and took its name from the Biblical city of Dvir (Joshua 21:15) that was located in the area. The original residents were joined by immigrants from South America.

A member of the kibbutz, Yitzhak Mintz, developed the QText word processing program in 1988 which was one of the first to handle the Hebrew language.
