= Be'er Milka =

Moshav in southern Israel

Be'er Milka: בְּאֵר מִלְכָּה (Hebrew)
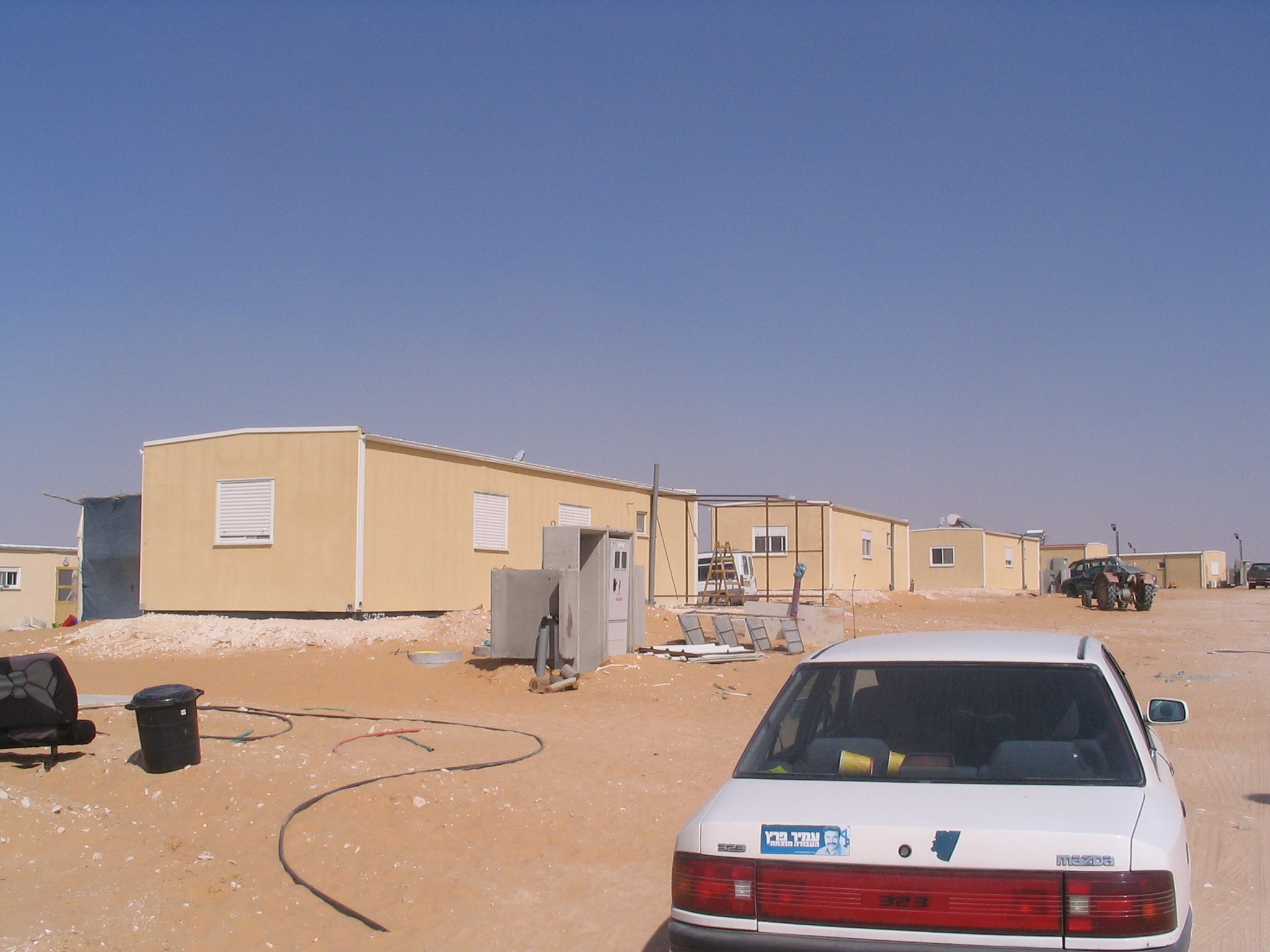
- Etymology: Milcah's well
- Location within Northern Negev region of Israel Location within Israel
- Coordinates: 30°55′56″N 34°24′28″E
- Country: Israel
- District: Southern
- Subdistrict: Beersheba
- Council: Ramat HaNegev
- Founded: 2006
- Founder: Noar HaOved members
- Population (2024): 385

Be'er Milka (Hebrew: בְּאֵר מִלְכָּה) is a moshav in southern Israel. Located in the central Negev desert close to the Egyptian border, around three kilometres from Kmehin, it falls under the jurisdiction of Ramat HaNegev Regional Council. The moshav is located in a nature reserve at the location of an ancient well at the confluence of Nahal Lavan and Nahal Nitzana. In 2024 it had a population of 385.

== History ==
In 2001 a gar'in group from Bnei HaMoshavim (associated with HaNoar HaOved VeHaLomed and the Moshavim Movement) began to organize in preparation for founding a new moshav. The gar'in group was established in 2002, and began organising themselves in Kmehin, before establishing Be'er Milka in 2006. The moshav is named after biblical Milka, the sister-in-law of Abraham (Genesis 22:20-23) and grandmother of Rebekah, the wife of Isaac (Genesis 24:47).
