= Shomria =

Shomria: שׁוֹמְרִיָּה (Hebrew)
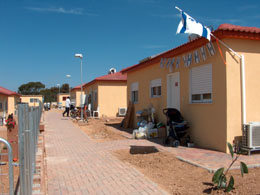

- Location within Ashkelon region of Israel Location within Israel
- Coordinates: 31°25′55″N 34°53′6″E
- Country: Israel
- District: Southern
- Subdistrict: Beersheba
- Council: Bnei Shimon
- Affiliation: Kibbutz Movement
- Founded: 1985
- Founder: Nahal
- Population (2024): 943

Shomria (Hebrew: שׁוֹמְרִיָּה) is a religious kibbutz in southern Israel. Located near Lehavim, it falls under the jurisdiction of Bnei Shimon Regional Council. In 2024, it had a population of 943.

== History ==
Shomria was first established as a Nahal settlement. In 1985, it became a civilian kibbutz inhabited by members of the left-wing Hashomer Hatzair movement. This was a period of great hardship, even for long-established kibbutzim, and Shomria was not able to develop economically, nor to attract enough members. Following the implementation of the Gaza disengagement plan in 2005, its members were offered to vacate the entire place in exchange for compensation, so that Shomria could be offered as a new home for settlers evacuated from the Gaza Strip. The kibbutz members agreed, and 60 families from the former settlement of Bnei Atzmon moved to Shomria in 2006. The new community fared well economically, and more evacuees joined. Around 2010, Shomria started moving towards renewed membership in the kibbutz movement, despite some ideological differences.
