= Sansana =

Israeli settlement in the West Bank

Sansana: סנסנה (Hebrew)
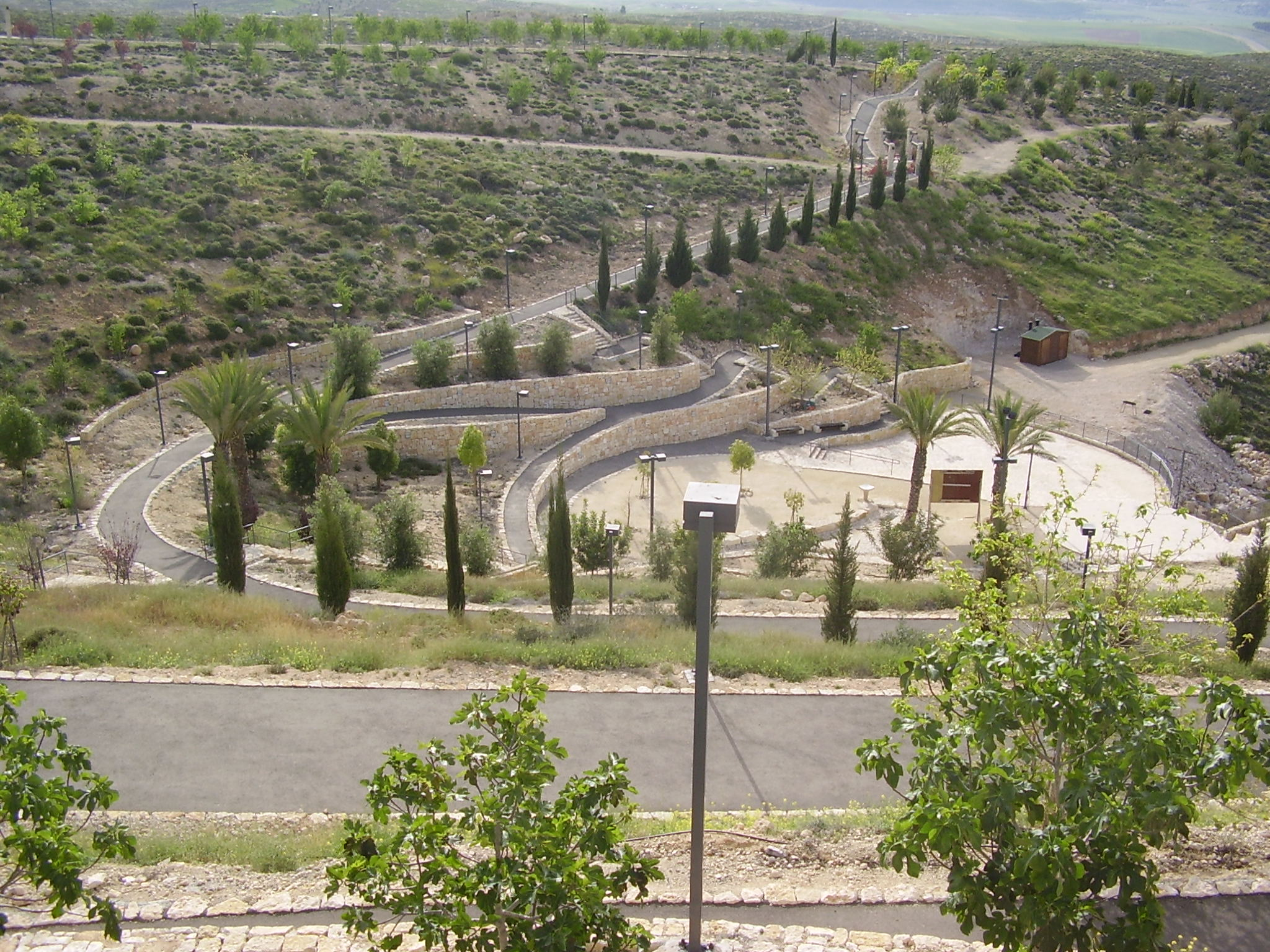

- Location within the Southern West Bank Location within the West Bank
- Coordinates: 31°21′43″N 34°54′10″E
- Country: Palestine
- District: Judea and Samaria Area
- Council: Har Hevron
- Region: West Bank
- Affiliation: Amana
- Founded: 1997
- Founder: Nahal
- Population (2024): 871
- Website: www.sansana.org

Sansana (Hebrew: סנסנה) is a religious Israeli settlement in the West Bank. Located in the southern Judaean Mountains, to the south-west of Hebron and over the Green Line, it is organised as a community settlement and falls under the jurisdiction of Har Hevron Regional Council. In 2024 it had a population of 871.

The international community considers Israeli settlements in the West Bank illegal under international law, but the Israeli government disputes this.

== History ==
The settlement was established in 1997 as a Nahal settlement, the first kvutza arrived on 21 April 1999, and it was civilianised by members of the Or Movement in 2000. Its name is taken from the name of a Biblical village nearby (Joshua 15:31) and from Song of Songs 7:9;

I said: 'I will climb up into the palm-tree, I will take hold of the branches thereof; and let thy breasts be as clusters of the vine, and the smell of thy countenance like apples;
