= Giv'ot Bar =

Community settlement in southern Israel

Giv'ot Bar: גבעות בר (Hebrew)
- Community settlement
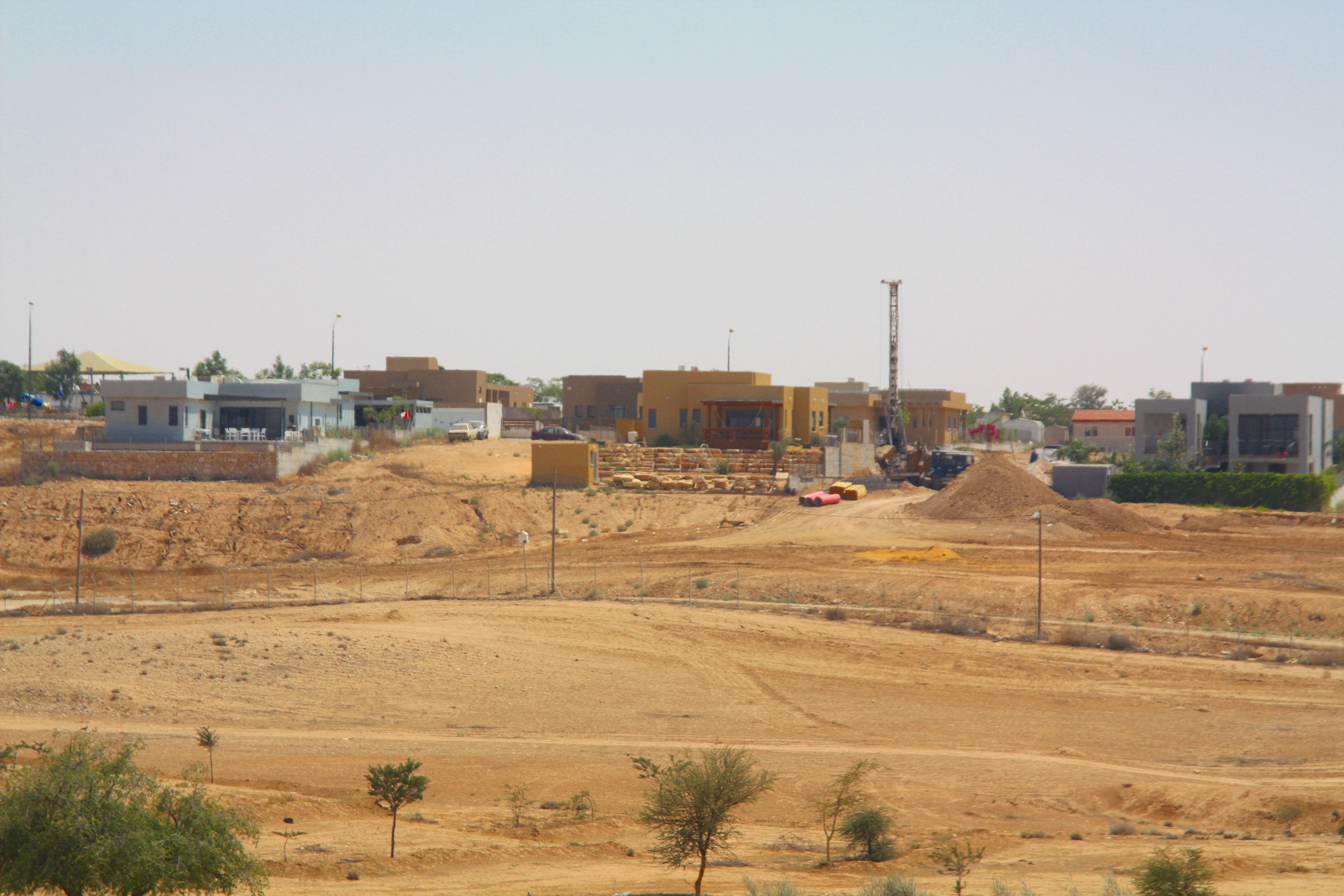
- Etymology: Grain Hills
- Location within Northwest Negev region of Israel
- Coordinates: 31°21′24″N 34°45′22″E
- Country: Israel
- District: Southern
- Subdistrict: Beersheba
- Council: Bnei Shimon
- Founded: 2004
- Population (2024): 1,352
- Website: www.givotbar.org.il

Giv'ot Bar (Hebrew: גבעות בר, lit. 'Grain Hills') is a community settlement in the northern Negev desert in southern Israel. Located to the south of the Bedouin city of Rahat, it falls under the jurisdiction of Bnei Shimon Regional Council. In 2024 it had a population of 1,352.

== History ==
Giv'ot Bar was established in 2004. Initially there were problems with acquiring the land from the Bedouins living in the area, but in 2004 mobile homes were moved onto the site. The village's name was given to it due to the wheat silos in the surrounding farms and the fact that it was located in a hilly area.
