= Kfar Hittim =

Moshav in northern Israel

Kfar Hittim: כְּפַר חִטִּים (Hebrew)
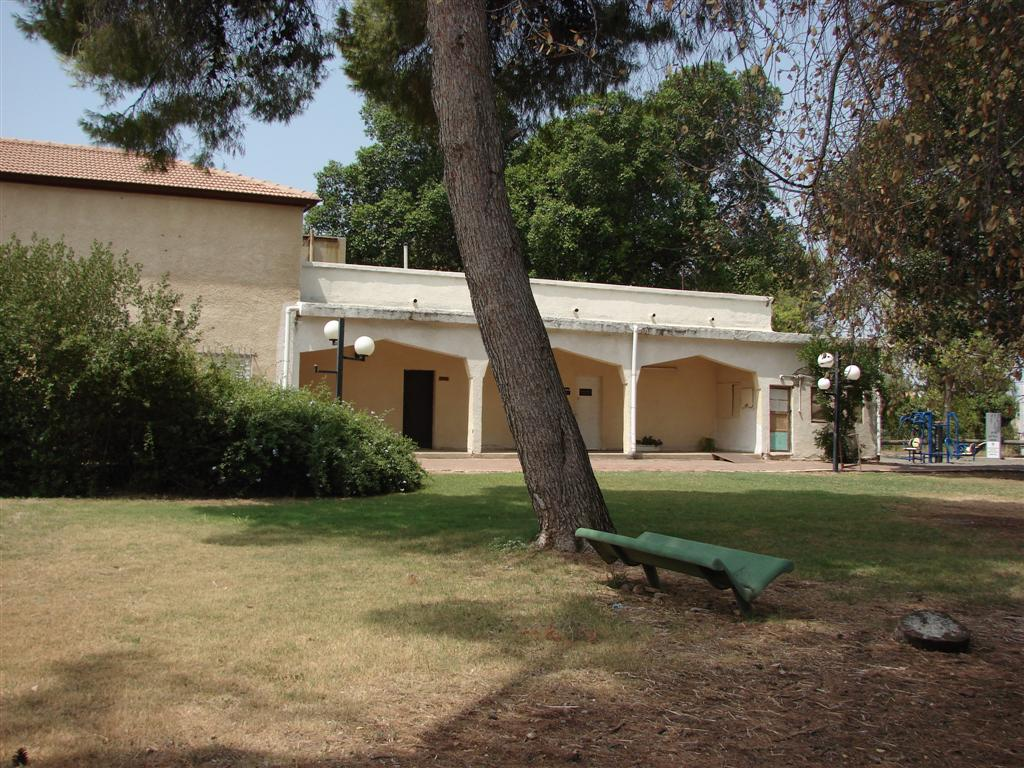

- Location within Northeast Israel Location within Israel
- Coordinates: 32°48′1″N 35°30′9″E
- Country: Israel
- District: Northern
- Subdistrict: Kinneret
- Council: Lower Galilee
- Affiliation: Moshavim Movement
- Founded: 7 December 1936
- Founder: Jewish National Fund
- Population (2024): 621

Kfar Hittim (Hebrew: כְּפַר חִטִּים) is a moshav shitufi in northern Israel. Located on a hill 3 km west of Tiberias, it falls under the jurisdiction of Lower Galilee Regional Council. It was Israel's first moshav shitufi, and can also be considered the first Tower and Stockade settlement. In 2024 it had a population of 621.

== History ==
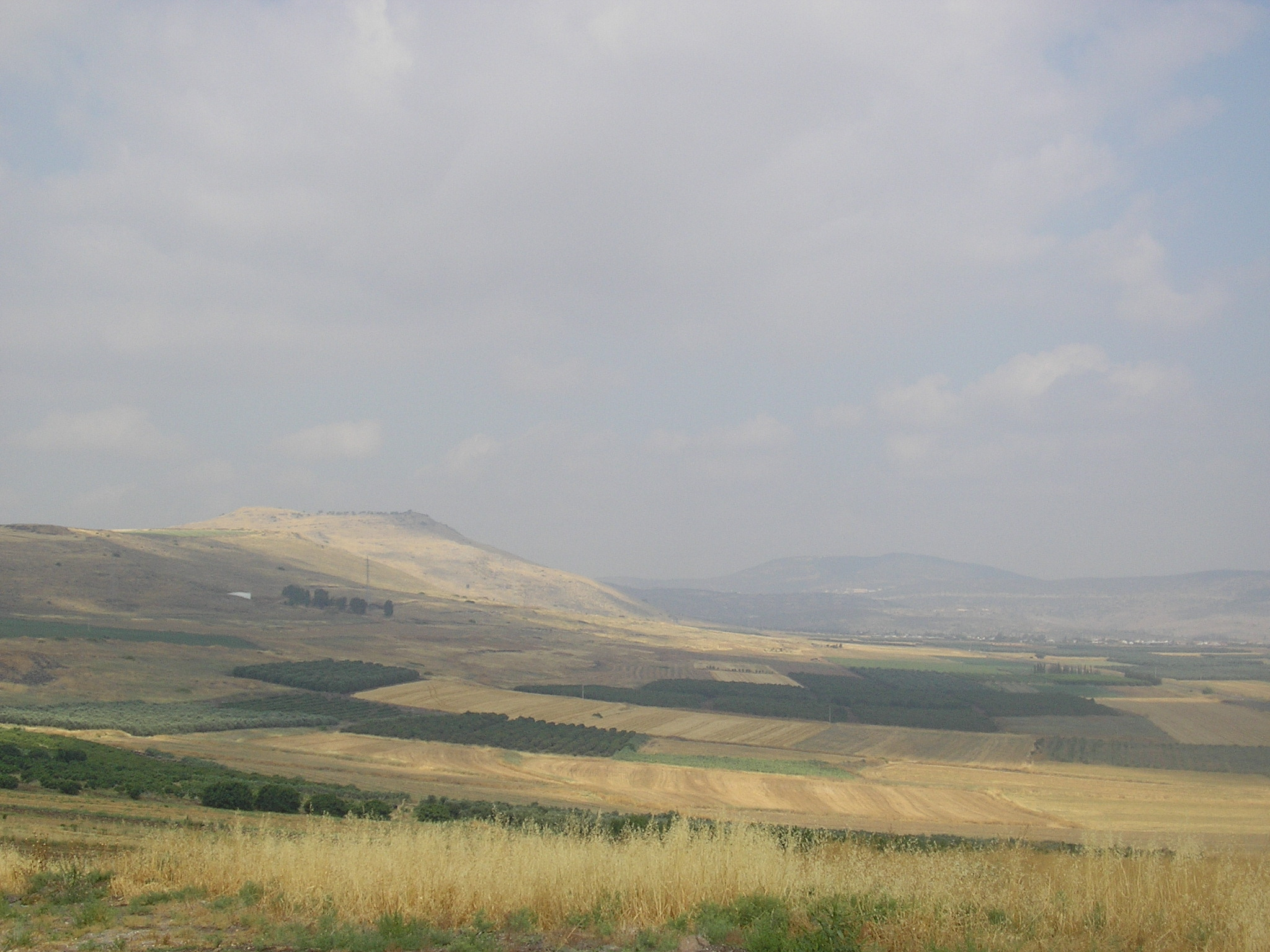
Horns of Hattin (left, appear yellow)

Hittin was located on the northern slopes of the double hill known as "Horns of Hattin". It was strategically and commercially significant due to its location overlooking the Plain of Hittin, which opens onto the coastal lowlands of Lake Tiberias to the east, and to the west is linked by mountain passes leading towards the plains of the Lower Galilee. These plains, with their east-west passages, served as routes for commercial caravans and military invasions.

=== Prehistorical finds ===
Archaeological excavations have yielded pottery fragments from the Pottery Neolithic and Chalcolithic period.

=== Antiquity ===
It has been suggested that the Arab village of Hittin was built over the Canaanite town of Siddim or Ziddim (Joshua 19:35), which in the third century BCE acquired the Old Hebrew name Kfar Hittin ("village of grain"). It was known as Kfar Hittaya in the Roman period. In the 4th century CE, it was a Jewish rabbinical town.

=== Ottoman period ===
==== Arab village ====
In 1596, Hittin was a part of the Ottoman Nāḥiyah (Arabic: نَـاحِـيَـة, "Subdistrict") of Tiberias under the Liwā’ (Arabic: لِـوَاء, "District") of Safed. The villagers paid taxes on wheat, barley, olives, goats and beehives. Richard Pococke, who visited in 1727, writes that the village was "famous for some pleasant gardens of lemon and orange trees; and here the Turks have a mosque, to which they pay great veneration, having, as they say, a great sheik buried there, whom they call Sede Ishab, who, according to tradition (as a very learned Jew assured me) is Jethro, the father-in-law of Moses." William McClure Thomson, who visited in the 1850s, reported that visiting the shrine was considered a cure for insanity. In 1875 Victor Guérin wrote about the local tradition that the tomb of Jethro (Neby Chaʾīb), the father-in-law of Moses, was found in Hittin.

A population list from about 1887 showed 1,350 inhabitants; 100 Jews and 1,250 Muslims. An elementary school was established in the village around 1897.

In the early 20th-century, village land in the eastern part of the Arbel Valley was sold to Jewish land societies. In 1910, Mitzpa, was established there.

==== Jewish village ====
The land on which Kfar Hittin sits was purchased by the Jewish National Fund in 1904, with the help of David Chaim, an Ottoman citizen previously in the employment of Edmond James de Rothschild. Two thousand dunams of land, consisting of 400 small parcels, were purchased from the Arab village of Hittin. The first attempt to settle there in 1913 failed due to friction with the local Arabs, the shortage of water and the lack of contiguity of the land.

=== British Mandate ===
In 1924, another attempt was made to settle in Kfar Hittin. Forty families moved to the site, where they lived in wooden cabins and built a barn, a communal chicken coop, a synagogue and a water tower. In the 1929 Palestine riots the moshav was attacked by the Arabs. As economic and security problems mounted, families left until the site was abandoned completely in 1933. Another short-lived attempt to settle the land was made in 1934, but the settlers left within a short period of time.

On 7 December 1936, 11 pioneers from HaKotzer group re-established the moshav as a Tower and Stockade settlement, using the abandoned synagogue as a fort and the old milk sheds as housing. The new settlement was set up as a moshav shitufi. On 19 December 1937 the moshav's guard, Shlomo Bin-Nun, was ambushed and murdered by an Arab gang.

During the 1940s additional families joined the moshav. Irrigation problems were solved in 1942 when piping was laid delivering water from the Sea of Galilee to the moshav. In 1944 a road connecting the moshav to Tiberias was laid. During this period the settlers started building permanent housing using basalt bricks and developed the moshav economy by building textile factory, dairy farm, garage, carpentry shop and bakery.

=== State of Israel ===
After the Israeli Declaration of Independence, the moshav continued to develop economically, expanding the textile factory and by building an apiary and a jewellery factory. However, by the 1990s the moshav was in deep debts and had to enter receivership and most of the moshav assets were either closed or leased out, and the moshav itself became a community settlement and a new neighborhood was built to the north of the old moshav. Plans to build a golf course and a luxury hotel in the moshav were made, but never materialized.

== Nearby landmarks ==
- Horns of Hattin – an extinct volcano and the battleground of the Battle of Hattin, in which the Muslim army led by Saladin defeated the Crusader army in 1187, leading to the siege and defeat of the Crusaders who controlled Jerusalem.
- Mount Arbel – a national park in the nearby moshav Arbel, containing the ruins of an ancient Jewish settlement and a synagogue and cliff dwellings on the northern side of the mount.
- Nabi Shu'ayb – the supposed burial site of Jethro (Yitro), a site revered by the Druze.

== Gallery ==
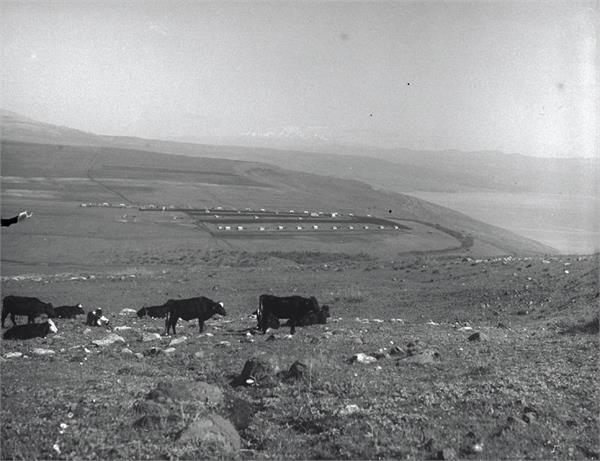
Kfar Hittim, 1937

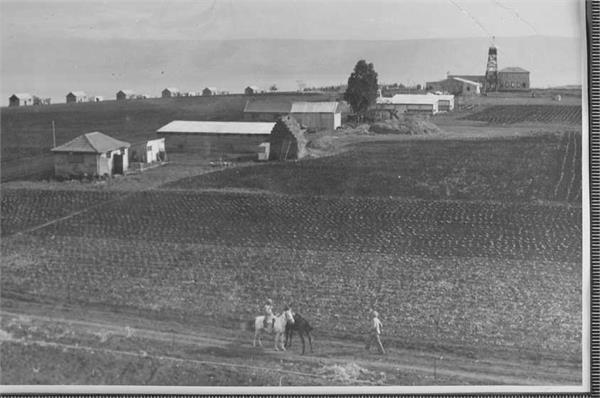
Kfar Hittim, 1940

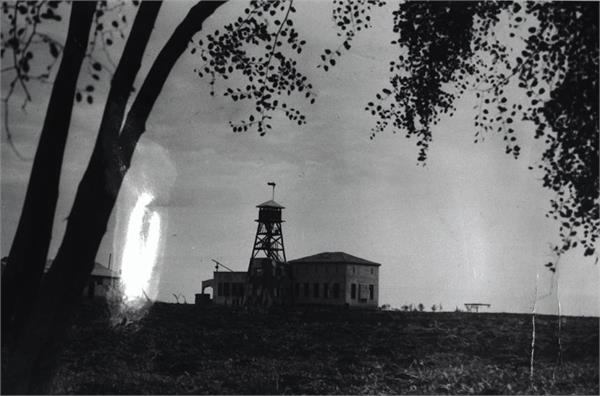
Kfar Hittim, 1940

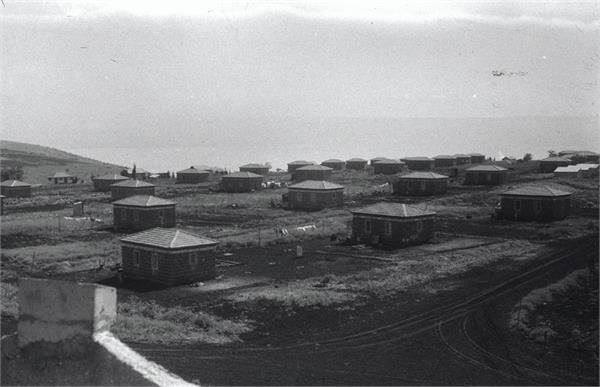
Kfar Hittim, 1944

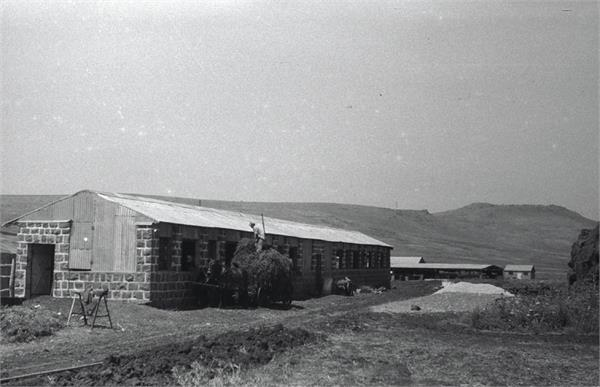
Kfar Hittim, 1944 (Horns of Hattin visible in distance)

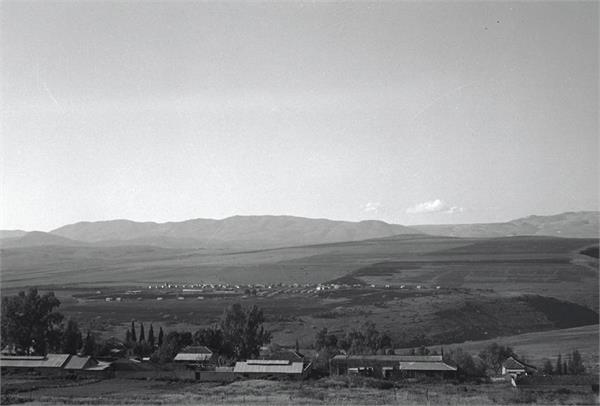
Kfar Hittim, 1945

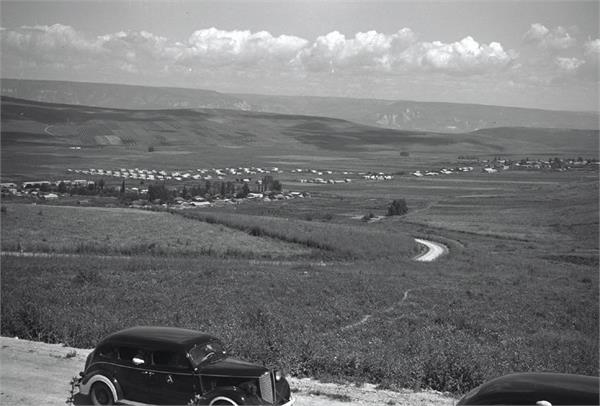
Kfar Hittim, 1945
