= Jesus Trail =

Hiking and pilgrimage route in Israel

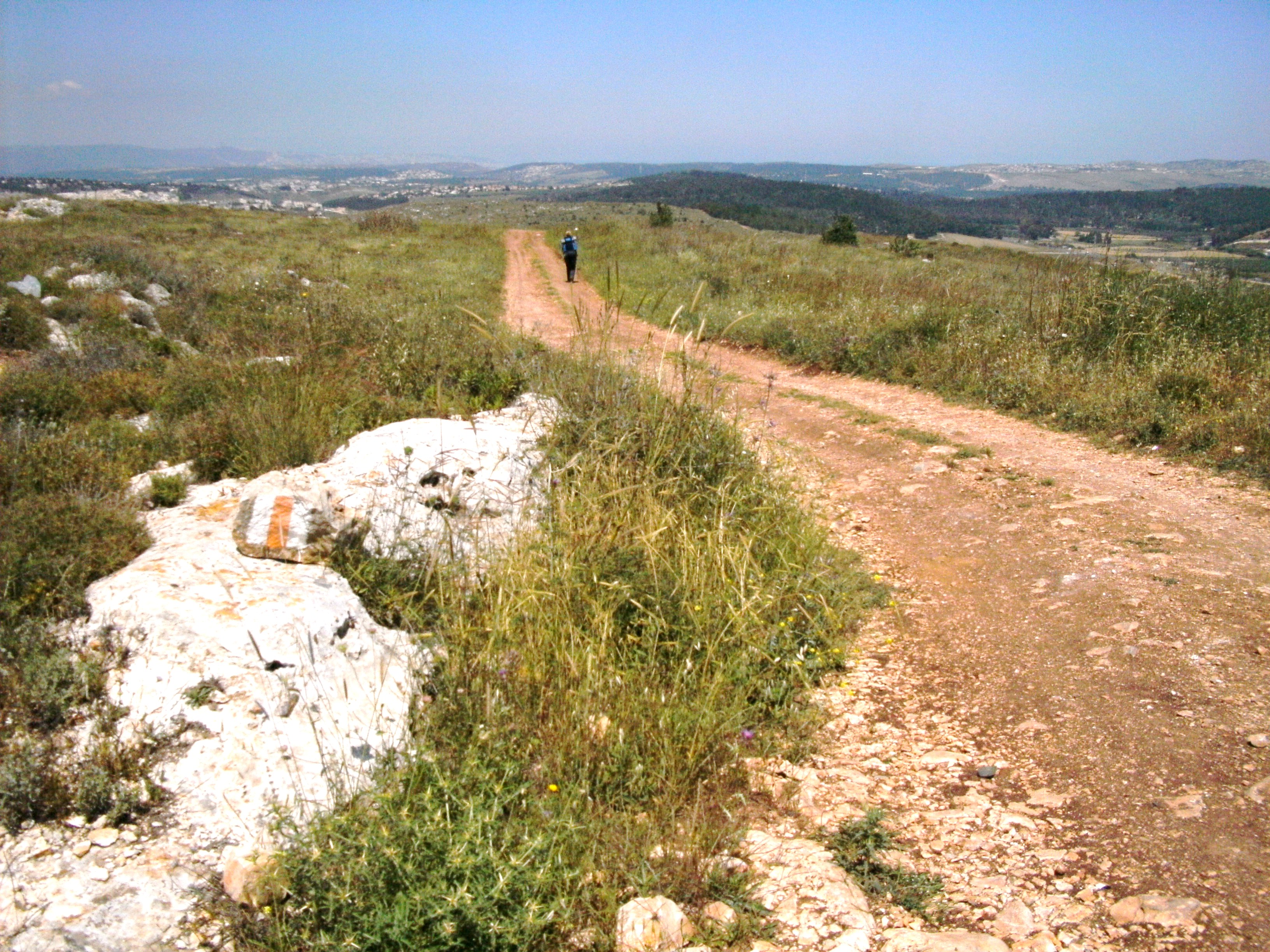
- Walking the Jesus Trail soon after Nazareth. On the stone to the left is a Jesus Trail mark
- Length: 65 km (40 mi)
- Location: Northern Israel
- Use: Hiking
- Difficulty: Moderate to strenuous
- Sights: Basic Route: Nazareth, Sepphoris, Cana, Hattin, Arbel, Sea of Galilee, Capernaum, Tabgha, Mount of Beatitudes; Alternate return route: Tiberias, Jordan River, Mount Tabor, and Mount Precipice.

The Jesus Trail (Hebrew: שביל ישוע, Sh'víl Yeshúa) is a 65 km (40 mi) hiking and pilgrimage route in the Galilee region of Israel that traces the route Jesus may have walked, connecting many sites from his life and ministry. The main part of the trail begins in Nazareth and passes through Sepphoris, Cana (Kafr Kanna), the Horns of Hattin, Mount Arbel Cliffs, the Sea of Galilee, Capernaum, Tabgha, and the Mount of Beatitudes. An alternate return route passes by Tiberias, the Jordan River, Mount Tabor, and Mount Precipice.

== History ==
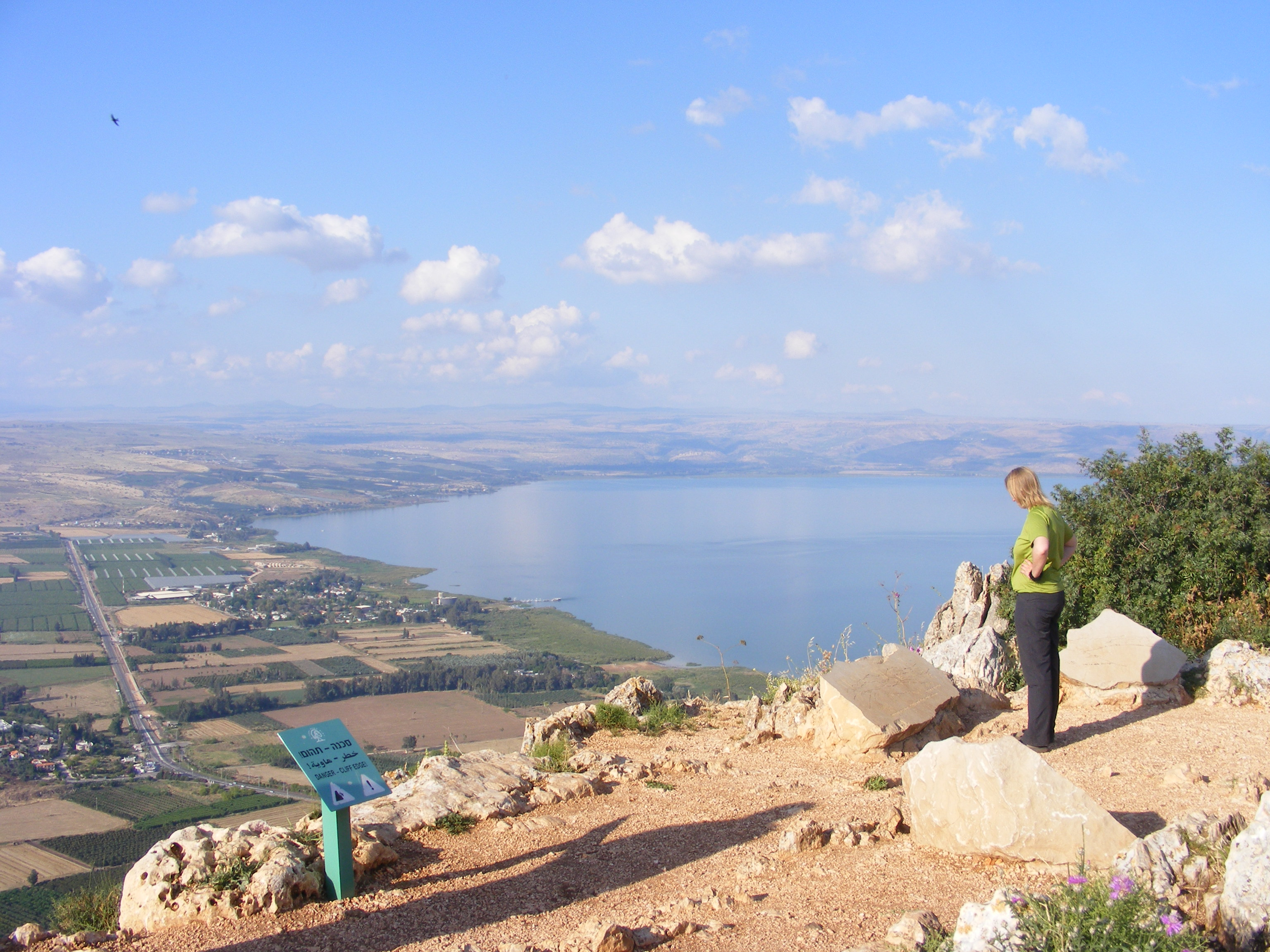
A view of the Sea of Galilee from the top of Mount Arbel

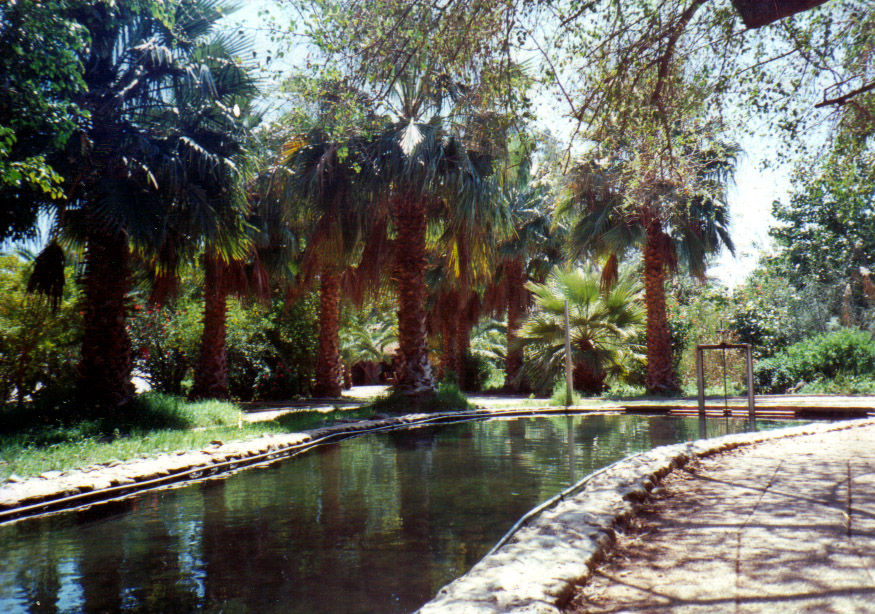
Tabgha pool

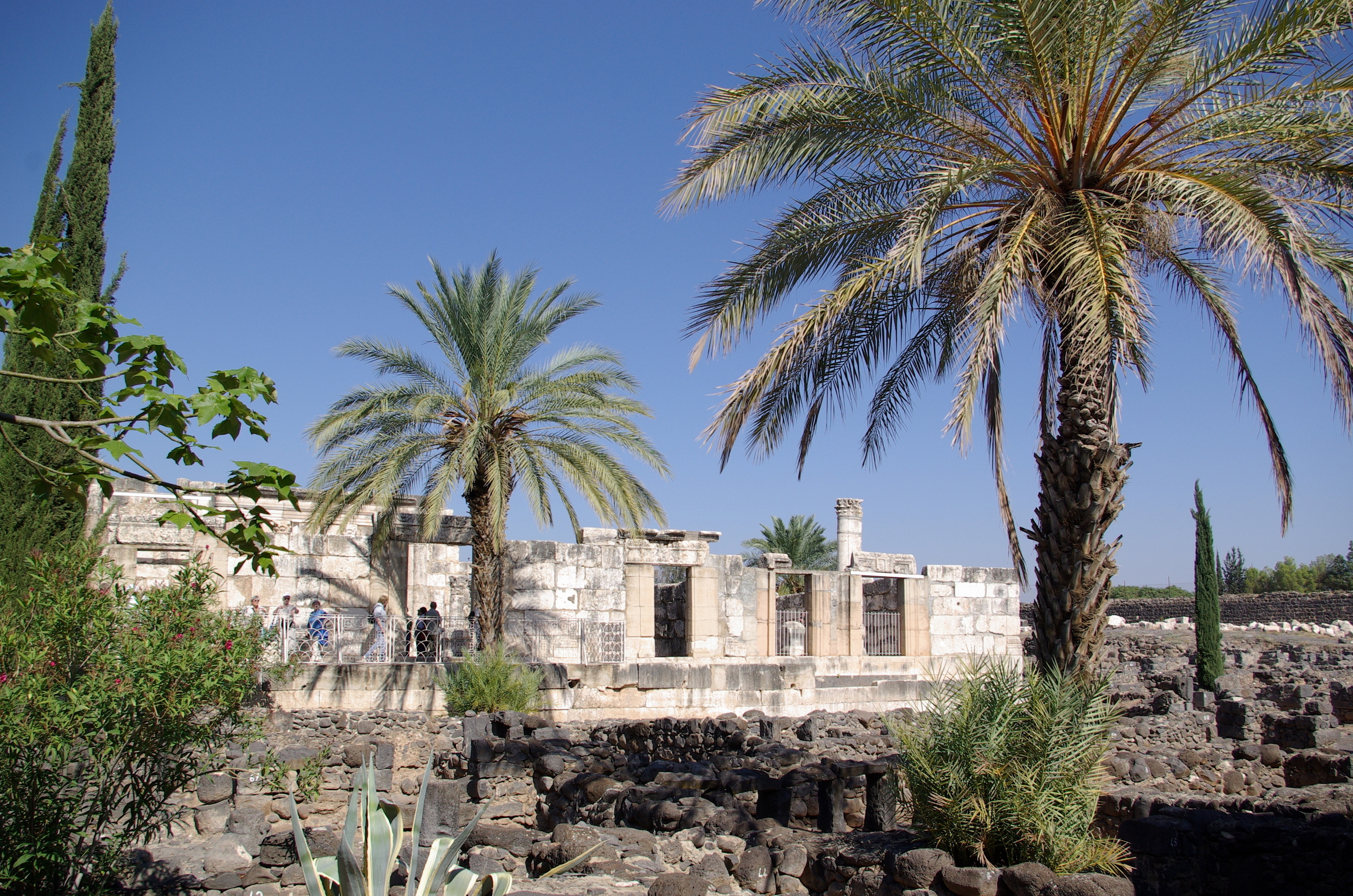
Capernaum

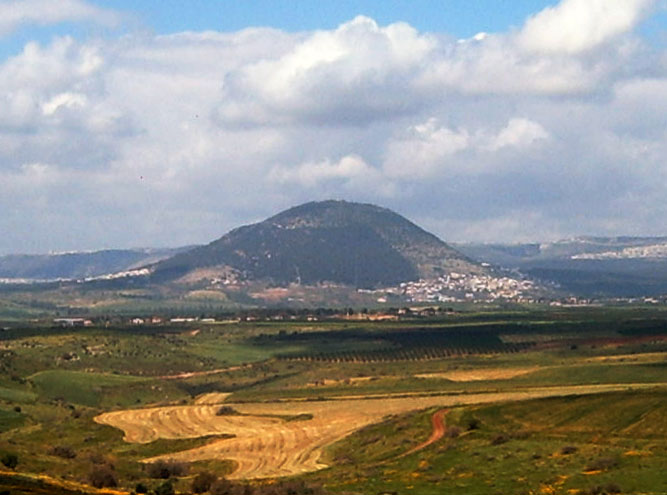
Mount Tabor

The trail was founded in 2007 by two hiking enthusiasts: Maoz Inon, a Jewish Israeli entrepreneur who has established hostels and guesthouses in Israel, and David Landis, a Christian American hiking specialist. The actual marking of the trail took place in 2008.

=== Biblical background ===
The biblical reference for the Jesus Trail is based on a verse from the New Testament Gospel of Matthew where Jesus is described as moving from his hometown of Nazareth, located in the hills of the Galilee, down to Capernaum - which was a lakeside fishing village on the Sea of Galilee. It is here that Jesus is described as gathering his first disciples, as he begins his ministry. The reference from Matthew reads: "Leaving Nazareth, he went and lived in Capernaum, which was by the lake." (Matthew 4:13). This account is also related in the two other synoptic gospels of Mark and Luke.

According to the Gospels, Capernaum became the home base for Jesus' ministry: "And getting into a boat he crossed over and came to his own city [referring to Capernaum]." (Matthew 9:1); also: "And when he returned to Capernaum after some days, it was reported that he was at home." (Mark 2:1).

== Management ==
The trail is currently managed and promoted largely by the work of volunteers, and is a non-profit project.

The trail is public and free for anyone who wants to hike and camp along its course. The Jesus Trail is marked with a blaze of three stripes painted on rocks along the way, white, orange, and white. When portions of the Jesus Trail combine with other trails, such as the Israel National Trail, an additional orange circle is added to the previous trail marker. All marking of the trail was completed by the public Israel Trails Committee (ITC), which works in conjunction with the Society for the Protection of Nature in Israel (SPNI).

Trail maintenance and cleaning up has been a combined effort of international, national, and local organizations including JNF-KKL (The Jewish National Fund), the Fauzi Azar Inn in Nazareth, village schools, and international volunteers.

On the official Jesus Trail Homepage Maoz Inon and David Landis explain the Jesus Trail philosophy: "We hope that travelers of diverse religious and ethnic backgrounds will gain a new understanding of the life of Jesus through the people and land that shaped his historical context along the Jesus Trail. Today, encounters on the trail still serve as opportunities to extend and receive hospitality with diverse groups of people. Modern travelers can practice living simply and traveling light, gaining wisdom from the spirit of Jesus’ words from Mark 6:8-9: 'Take nothing for the journey except a staff—no bread, no bag, no money in your belts. Wear sandals but not an extra tunic'".

The Jesus Trail was designed in the tradition of pilgrimage hiking trails around the world, such as the Camino de Santiago de Compostela (the Way of Saint James) in northern Spain and the Saint Paul Trail in Turkey. The medieval practice of religious pilgrimage has seen a resurgence in recent years, with almost 200,000 hikers per year on the Camino de Santiago in the first decade of the 21st century.

== Target group ==
The trail is geared for Christians who seek a pilgrimage route that allows for a more personal experience of the Galilee and sites from the life of Jesus, but integrates historical sites from different eras, sites sacred to other religions, nature sites, breathtaking panoramas and hiking for those who seek a physical challenge. The Gospel Trail is a similar hiking path that opened in November 2011 to attract Christian tourism to Israel, which accounts for two-thirds of all incoming tourism.

== Sections of the trail ==
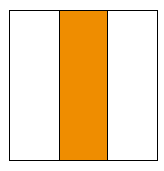
The Jesus Trail Mark

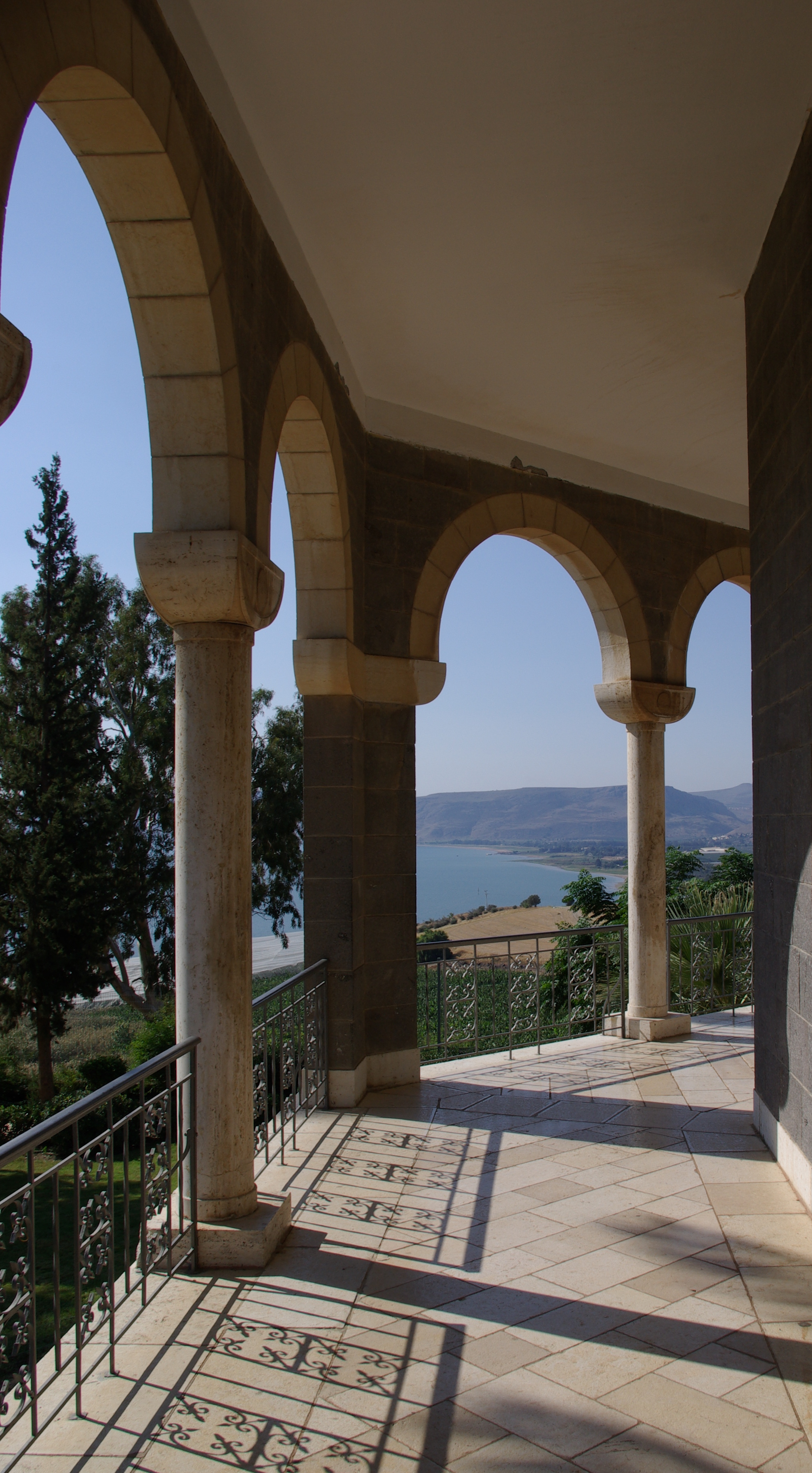
The Mount of Beatitudes and the Sea of Galilee

The geography and distances involved naturally allow the Jesus Trail to be walked as a series of day-hikes for a total of four days, with each day's hike being between 13 and 19 km (8.1 and 11.8 mi) in length.

- 1st Day: Nazareth to Cana via Sepphoris
- 2nd Day: Cana to Kibbutz Lavi
- 3rd Day: Kibbutz Lavi to Moshav Arbel
- 4th Day: Moshav Arbel to Capernaum via Mount of Beatitudes

=== Details of the four sections ===
- Day 1: Nazareth to Cana via Sepphoris – The trail starts in center of Nazareth at the Church of the Annunciation, goes through the Old City of Nazareth and then ascends via steep stairways to the ridge overlooking the city. From there the trail goes out into agricultural fields towards the extensively excavated ancient city of Tsippori (Sepphoris). After passing through the Arab village of Mash'had the trail arrives at Kafr Kanna, the traditional site of the New Testament account of Jesus turning water into wine.
- Day 2: Cana to Kibbutz Lavi – After leaving Cana, the trail goes almost entirely along forests and through natural and cultivated fields to end at the outskirts of the modern Jewish agricultural commune (Hebrew: kibbutz) of Lavi, which is located near the hill of the Horns of Hattin.
- Day 3: Kibbutz Lavi to Moshav Arbel – This hike goes from hilltop to hilltop, from the panoramic view at the Horns of Hattin, past the Druze shrine of Nabi Shu'ayb in the small Arbel Valley, through striking scenery of a historically dense landscape, to end near the Jewish agricultural cooperative (Hebrew: moshav) of Arbel.
- Day 4: Moshav Arbel to Capernaum via Mount of Beatitudes – After ascending Mount Arbel there is a climb down the cliff to come out on a small fertile agricultural plain adjacent to the lake known as the Sea of Galilee (Kinneret). Then the trail arrives at the northern shore of the lake to the church at Tabgha which commemorates the New Testament account of Jesus feeding the multitudes, then to the church and gardens at the Mount of Beatitudes, which commemorates the Sermon on the Mount, and then arriving at the ancient lakeside fishing village of Capernaum with its extensive ruins and modern church.

== See also ==
- Tourism in Israel
- Geography of Israel
- List of long-distance footpaths
