= List of World Heritage Sites in Israel =

Location of World Heritage Sites in Israel

The United Nations Educational, Scientific and Cultural Organization (UNESCO) World Heritage Sites are places of importance to cultural or natural heritage as described in the UNESCO World Heritage Convention, established in 1972. Cultural heritage consists of monuments (such as architectural works, monumental sculptures, or inscriptions), groups of buildings, and sites (including archaeological sites). Natural heritage is defined as physical and biological formations, geological and physiographical formations (including habitats of threatened flora and fauna), and sites which are important from the point of view of scientific research, conservation or natural aesthetic.

The State of Israel ratified the convention on 6 October 1999, making its cultural and natural sites eligible for inclusion on the list. The country has nine sites, all of which are cultural. The earliest inclusions were Masada and the Old City of Acre in 2001; the latest inclusion was the network of caves at Beit Guvrin-Maresha National Park in 2014. In addition, the Israeli cabinet has put 18 sites on its tentative list, meaning they intend to nominate them as World Heritage Sites sometime in the future. 14 of them were put in the year 2000. Unlike the official list, the tentative list contains several sites of natural and mixed heritage.

Due to its occupation of the State of Palestine, Israel has a strained relationship with UNESCO, described by Palestinian journalist Ramzy Baroud as "an existential battle". UNESCO recognizes Palestine's ownership of East Jerusalem in 2011, despite assigning no countries to the Old City of Jerusalem and its Walls site. On that same year, Palestine ratified the convention, a decision opposed by Israel who left UNESCO in 2019 claiming that the organization fails to recognize its cultural connection with Jerusalem, though it still remains in the convention. The inclusion of Tell es-Sultan in ancient Jericho (a city in the West Bank of Palestine) as a Palestinian site was criticized by Israel's Foreign Ministry as indicating "Palestinians' cynical use of UNESCO and politicization of [it]" and wishes to revert the "distorted decisions". Israeli heritage organization Emek Shaveh noting that the part of Jericho claimed by Israel is not the one listed.

== World Heritage Sites ==
UNESCO lists sites under ten criteria; each entry must meet at least one of the criteria. Criteria i through vi are cultural, and vii through x are natural.

Site; named after the World Heritage Committee's official designation
Location; at city, regional, or provincial level and geocoordinates
Criteria; as defined by the World Heritage Committee
Area; in hectares and acres. If available, the size of the buffer zone has been noted as well. A value of zero implies that no data has been published by UNESCO
Year; during which the site was inscribed to the World Heritage List
Description; brief information about the site, including reasons for qualifying as an endangered site, if applicable

=== World Heritage Sites located in Israel ===
| Site | Image | Location | Criteria | Area ha (acre) | Year | Description | Refs |
|---|---|---|---|---|---|---|---|
| Bahá’i Holy Places in Haifa and the Western Galilee | Large white buildings in a landscape garden. | Haifa District and Northern District; 32°49′46″N 34°58′18″E | Cultural: (iii)(vi) | 63 (160); buffer zone 255 (630) | 2008 | | |
| Biblical Tels: Megiddo, Hazor, Be’er Sheva | Ruins of building consisting of low walls of unhewn stones. | Northern District and Negev; 32°35′50″N 35°10′56″E | Cultural: (ii)(iii)(iv)(vi) | 96 (240); buffer zone 604 (1,490) | 2005 | | |
| Incense Route – Desert Cities in the Negev | Ruins of buildings in a desert. | Negev; 30°32′28″N 35°9′39″E | Cultural: (iii)(v) | — | 2005 | | |
| Masada | Ruins of a building made of unhewn stones. | Southern District; 31°18′49″N 35°21′10″E | Cultural: (iii)(iv)(vi) | 276 (680); buffer zone 28,965 (71,570) | 2001 | | |
| Old City of Acre | A fortress or a tower of a fortification. | Western Galilee; 32°55′42″N 35°5′2″E | Cultural: (ii)(iii)(v) | 63 (160) | 2001 | | |
| White City of Tel Aviv—the Modern Movement | White modern building. | Tel Aviv; 32°4′0″N 34°47′0″E | Cultural: (ii)(iv) | 140 (350); buffer zone 197 (490) | 2003 | | |
| Sites of Human Evolution at Mount Carmel: The Nahal Me’arot / Wadi el-Mughara Caves | | Mount Carmel; 32°40′12″N 34°57′55″E | Cultural: (iii)(v) | 54 (130); buffer zone 370 (910) | 2012 | | |
| Caves of Maresha and Beit Guvrin in the Judean Lowlands as a Microcosm of the Land of the Caves | | Southern District; 31°36′0″N 34°53′44″E | Cultural: (v) | 259 (640) | 2014 | | |
| Necropolis of Beit She’arim: A Landmark of Jewish Renewal | | Haifa District; 32°42′8″N 35°7′37″E | Cultural: (ii)(iii) | 12 (30); buffer zone 64 (160) | 2015 | | |

== List of properties in the tentative list ==
In addition to sites inscribed on the World Heritage List, member states can maintain a list of tentative sites that they may consider for nomination. Nominations for the World Heritage List are only accepted if the site was previously listed on the tentative list. As of 2015, Israel recorded 18 sites on its tentative list. The sites, along with the year they were included on the tentative list are:

| Site | Image | Location | Criteria | Year |
|---|---|---|---|---|
| Triple-arch Gate at Dan & Sources of the Jordan | | Northern District | Mixed: (iv)(vi)(vii)(x) | 2000 |
| Early Synagogues in the Galilee | | Northern District | Cultural: (iii)(vi) | 2000 |
| The Galilee Journeys of Jesus & the Apostles | | Northern District | Cultural: (iii)(vi) | 2000 |
| Sea of Galilee & its Ancient Sites | | Northern District | Mixed | 2000 |
| Khirbat al-Minya | | Northern District | Cultural: (iv) | 2000 |
| Mount Arbel (Arbel, Nabi Shu'ayb, Horns of Hattin) | | Northern District | Mixed | 2000 |
| Degania Alef & Nahalal | | Northern District | Cultural: (v)(vi) | 2000 |
| Beit She'an | | Northern District | Cultural: (ii)(iv)(v)(vi) | 2000 |
| Caesarea Maritima | | Haifa District | Cultural: (ii)(iv)(v)(vi) | 2000 |
| White Mosque of Ramla | | Central District | Cultural: (ii)(iv) | 2000 |
| Jerusalem (extension) | | Jerusalem District | Cultural: (i)(ii)(iii)(iv)(v)(vi) | 2000 |
| Mount Karkom | | Southern District | Cultural: (iii)(v) | 2000 |
| Timna Valley | | Southern District | Mixed | 2000 |
| The Crusader Fortresses | | Various districts | Cultural: (iv)(v)(vi) | 2000 |
| Makhteshim Country | | Southern District | Mixed | 2001 |
| The Great Rift Valley – Migratory Routes – Hula Valley | | Northern District | Natural | 2004 |
| Lifta (Mey Naftoah) – Traditional Mountain Village | | Jerusalem District | Cultural: (ii)(iii)(v) | 2015 |
| Ein Kerem, a Village & its Cultural Landscape | | Jerusalem District | Cultural: (ii)(iii)(v)(vi) | 2015 |

== See also ==
- Tourism in Israel
- List of World Heritage Sites in Western Asia
