= Mount Arbel =

Mountain in Israel

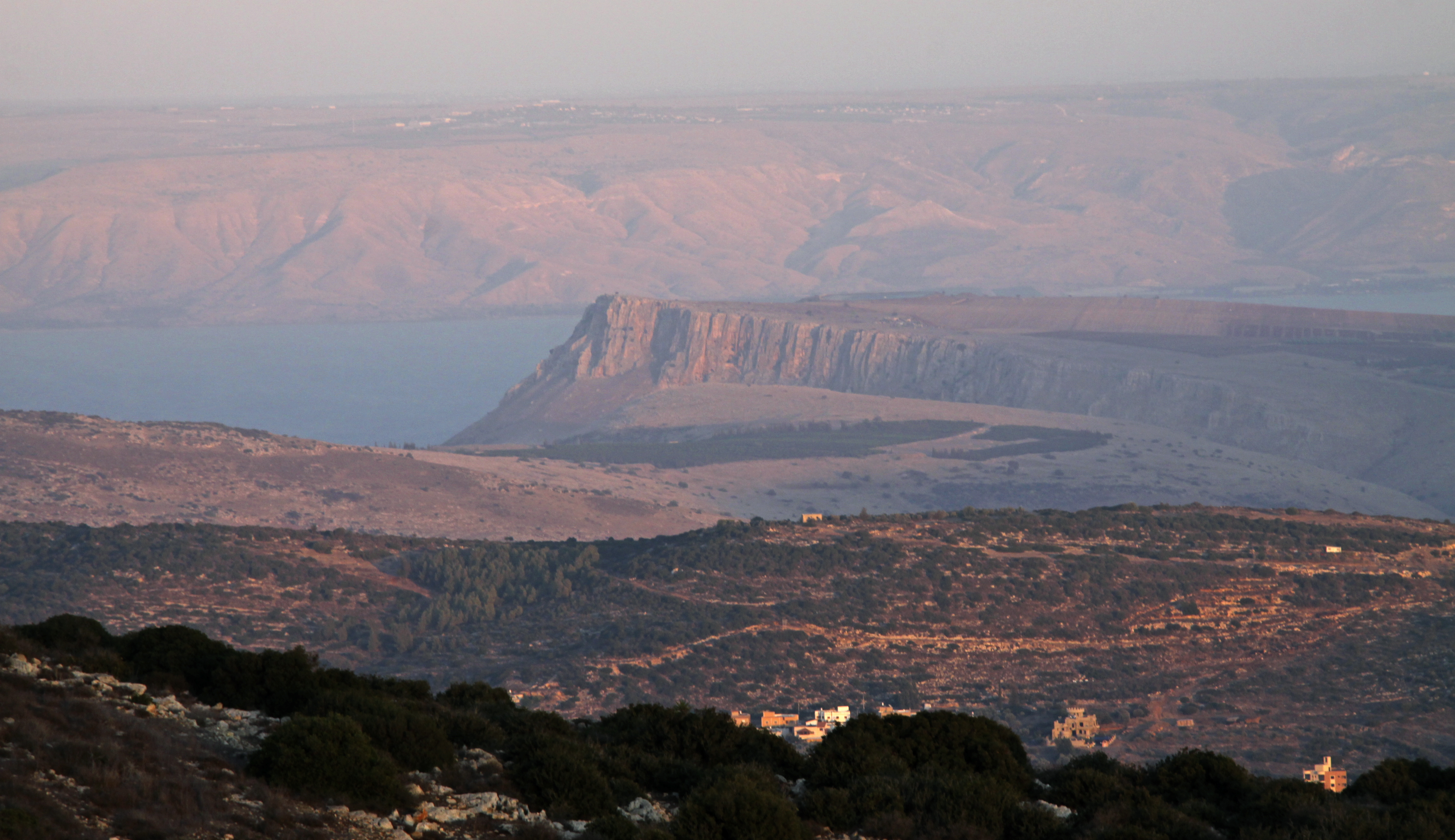

Highest point
- Elevation: 181 m (594 ft)
- Listing: World Heritage Sites in Israel
- Coordinates: 32°49′28″N 35°30′00″E

Geography
- Location within Israel Location within Northeast Israel
- Country: Israel

Mount Arbel (Hebrew: הר ארבל, Har Arbel) is a mountain in the Lower Galilee near Tiberias in Israel, with high cliffs, views of Mount Hermon and the Golan Heights, a cave-fortress, and ruins of an ancient synagogue. The mountain was formed by geological processes leading to the creation of the Jordan Rift Valley. Mount Arbel sits across from Mount Nitai.

Mount Arbel overlooks four villages: Kfar Zeitim, Arbel, Kfar Hittim, and Mitzpa. The peak, at 181 metres above sea level (380 metres above the surrounding area), dominates the surroundings (much of the area is below sea level), and from the lookout atop the mountain, almost all of the Galilee is visible including Safed, as well as Tiberias and most of the Sea of Galilee, and the slopes of the Golan Heights on the other side of the Sea.

== History ==
Dug into the mountain are a number of documented Jewish cliff dwellings, expanded from natural caves, dating back to the Second Temple period. The inhabitants built ritual baths and water cisterns. At different times, the caves were fortified and connected by an internal staircase. Some Jews also lived in houses built on top of the mountain.

=== Hellenistic period ===
In 161 BCE "Arbela" was the site of a battle between the supporters of the Maccabees and Seleucid general Bacchides, who defeated and killed his opponents (1 Macc. 9:2). Josephus mentions in his Antiquities that the Greek general captured the many people who had taken refuge in the caves at Arbela.

=== Roman period ===
In 38 BCE, we are told by Josephus, partisans of Antigonus fighting against Herod who was conquering the land with Roman support, were either killed in their cave hideouts or committed suicide.

It is also Josephus who, writing about himself in the third person, tells us how he fortified the caves and used them as storage base at the beginning of the First Jewish–Roman War in the year 66 CE, when he was in charge of the defense of Galilee:

"Moreover, he [Josephus] built walls about the caves near the lake of Gennesar, which places lay in the lower Galilee".

=== Late Roman and Byzantine period: the Arbel synagogue ===
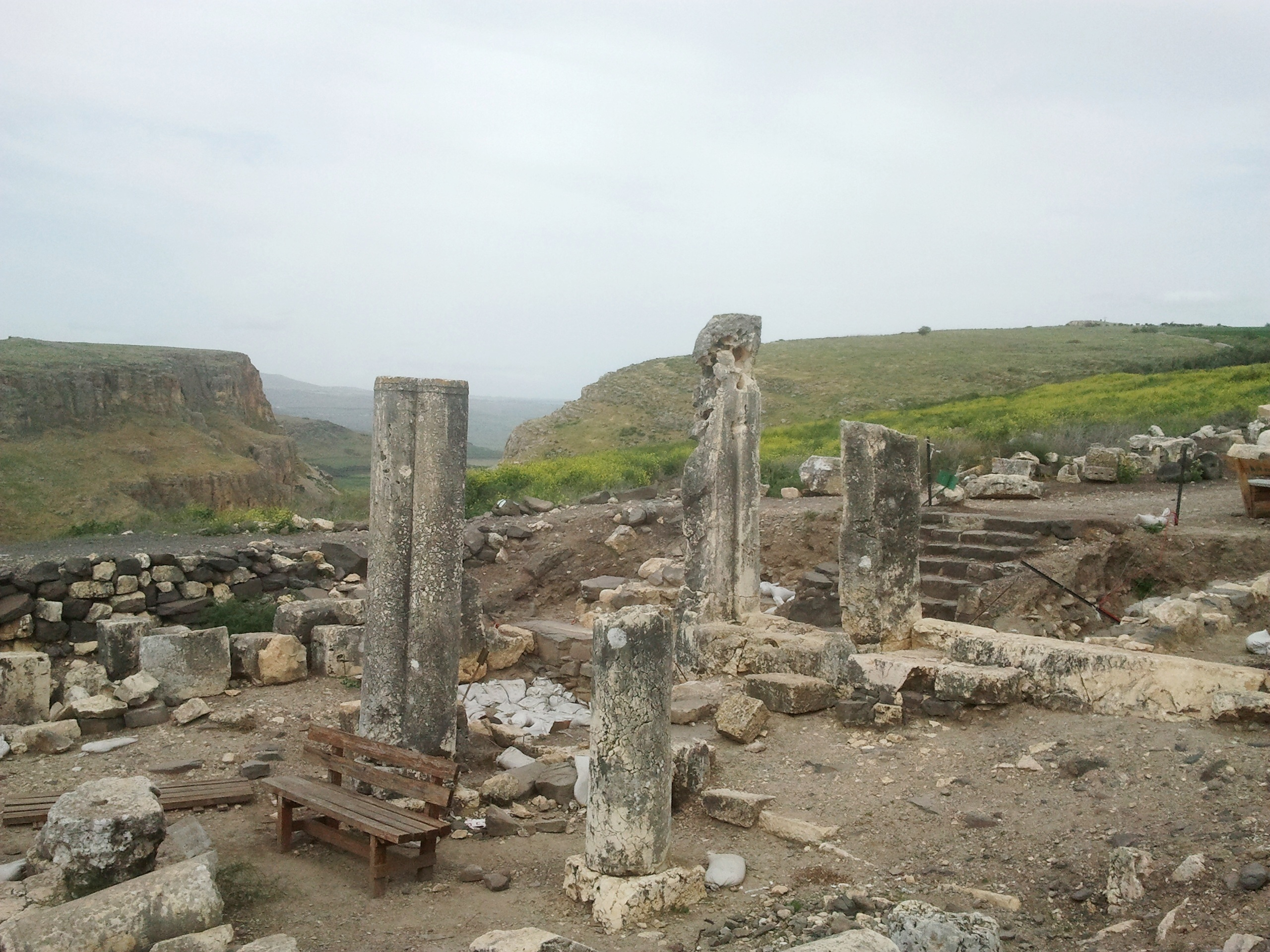
Arbel ancient synagogue

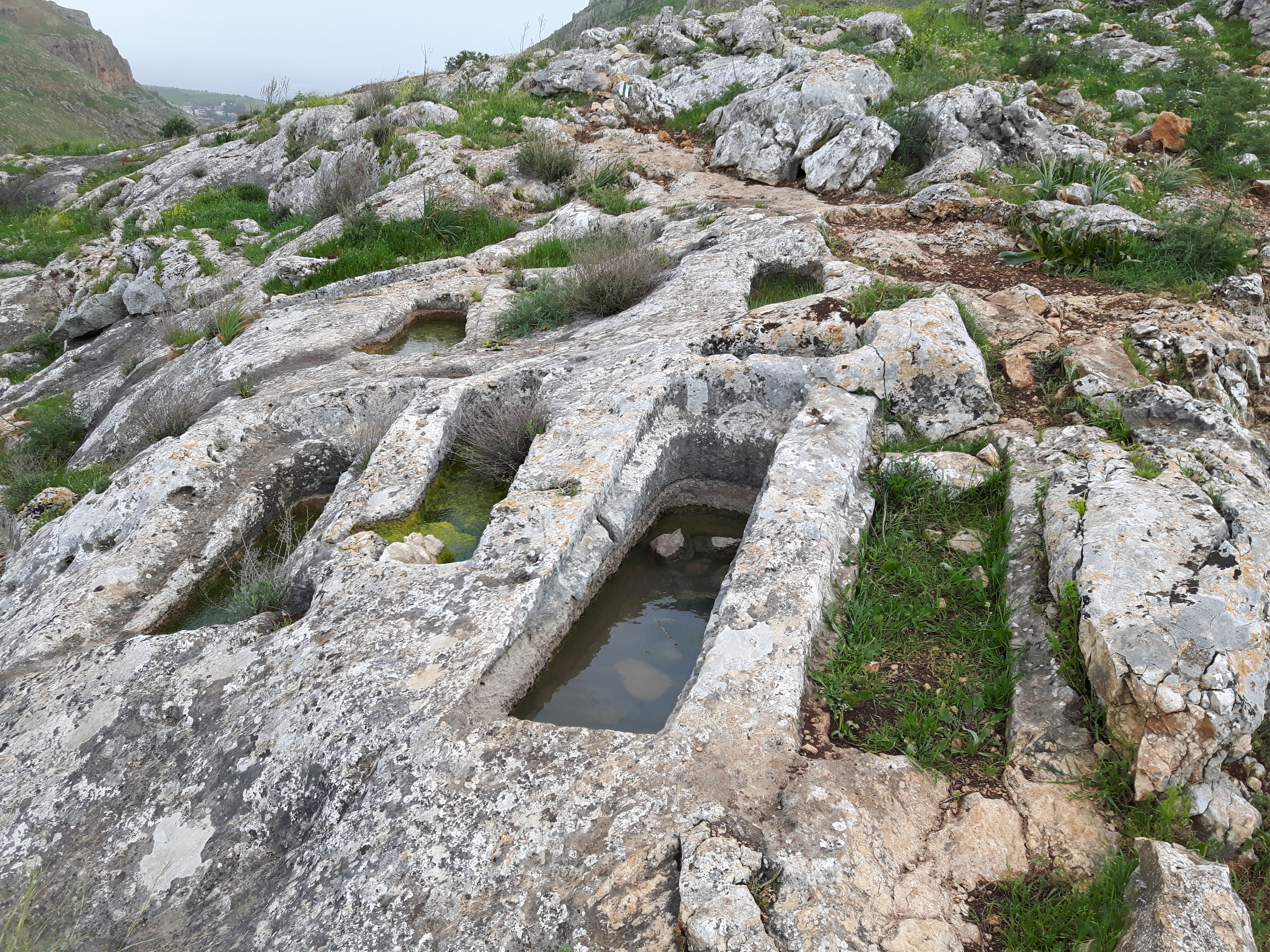

Nearby are the ruins of an ancient Jewish settlement with a synagogue, built in the 4th, rebuilt in the 6th and kept in use until the 8th century CE.

=== Ottoman period ===
The cave system was finally refortified into a cave castle by Ali Beg, the son of 17th-century Druze ruler, emir Fakhr ad-Din al-Maani. Because Ali Beg belonged to the Maan dynasty, his castle was called Qal'at Ibn Maan, the "fortress of the son of Ma'an" by locals.

== Nature reserve and national park ==
The area was declared a nature reserve in 1967, covering 1400 dunams. The national park (8509 dunams) includes most of Nahal Arbel, that begins near Eilabun and empties into the Sea of Galilee near Migdal. The reserve covers the immediate area around the cliff.

Mount Arbel (left), the valley of Wadi Hamam, and Mount Nitai (right) seen from across the Sea of Galilee

On the south side of the cliff, there is a gradual prolonged climb through agricultural and pasture land and from the peak there is a steep 400 meters drop. From here there are metal handholds driven into the rock to aid those who want to make the climb down to the valley below. Below that are a series of switchbacks that eventually lead to the Bedouin village of Hamaam.

Mount Arbel, with its 110-metre vertical drop, is the only known mountain in Israel to serve as a base jumping site. A hike to the top of Mount Arbel from the south is included in the Israel National Trail, and an approach from the west is part of the Jesus Trail; the trails converge temporarily at the peak.

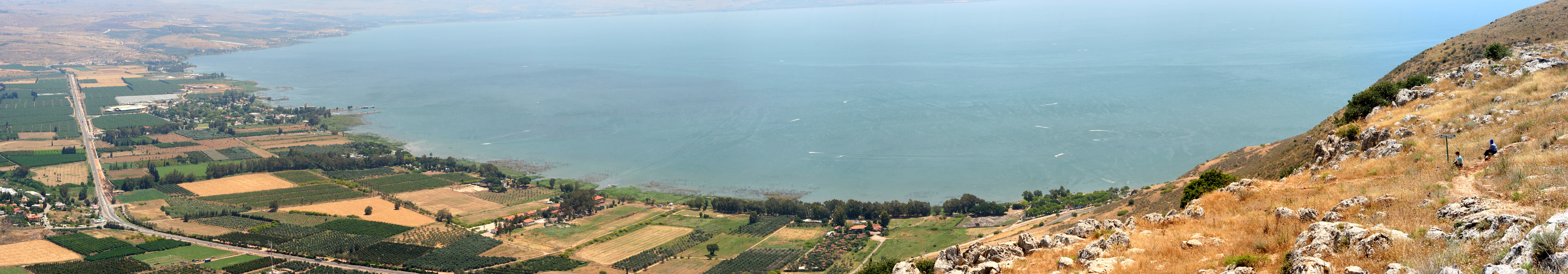
Panoramic view of the Sea of Galilee from the Mountain
