= Ziddim =

Ancient fortified city of the Hebrew Bible

Ziddim was an ancient city in Naphtali. It is described in the Book of Joshua 19:35 as one of sixteen or nineteen fortified cities, the others including Zer, Hammath, Rakkath and Chinnereth. The Talmud identifies Ziddim with Caphar Hittaia, the site of the Palestinian village of Hattin, located about 8 kilometers (5.0 mi) west of Tiberias, north of the Horns of Hattin. This identification is not certain, and the exact location today remains unknown.

== See also ==
- Place names in Palestine

== Bibliography ==
- Bromiley, Geoffrey W. (1995) [1979]. International Standard Bible Encyclopedia. Vol. 4: Q-Z. Grand Rapids: Wm. B. Eerdmans. ISBN 978-0-8028-3784-4. OCLC 50333607.
- Neusner, Jacob (1982). The Talmud of the land of Israel: a preliminary translation and explanation. Vol. 19: Megillah. Chicago; London: University of Chicago Press. ISBN 978-0-226-57678-7. OCLC 715648904.
