= Kfar Zeitim =

Moshav in northern Israel

Kfar Zeitim: כְּפַר זֵיתִים (Hebrew)
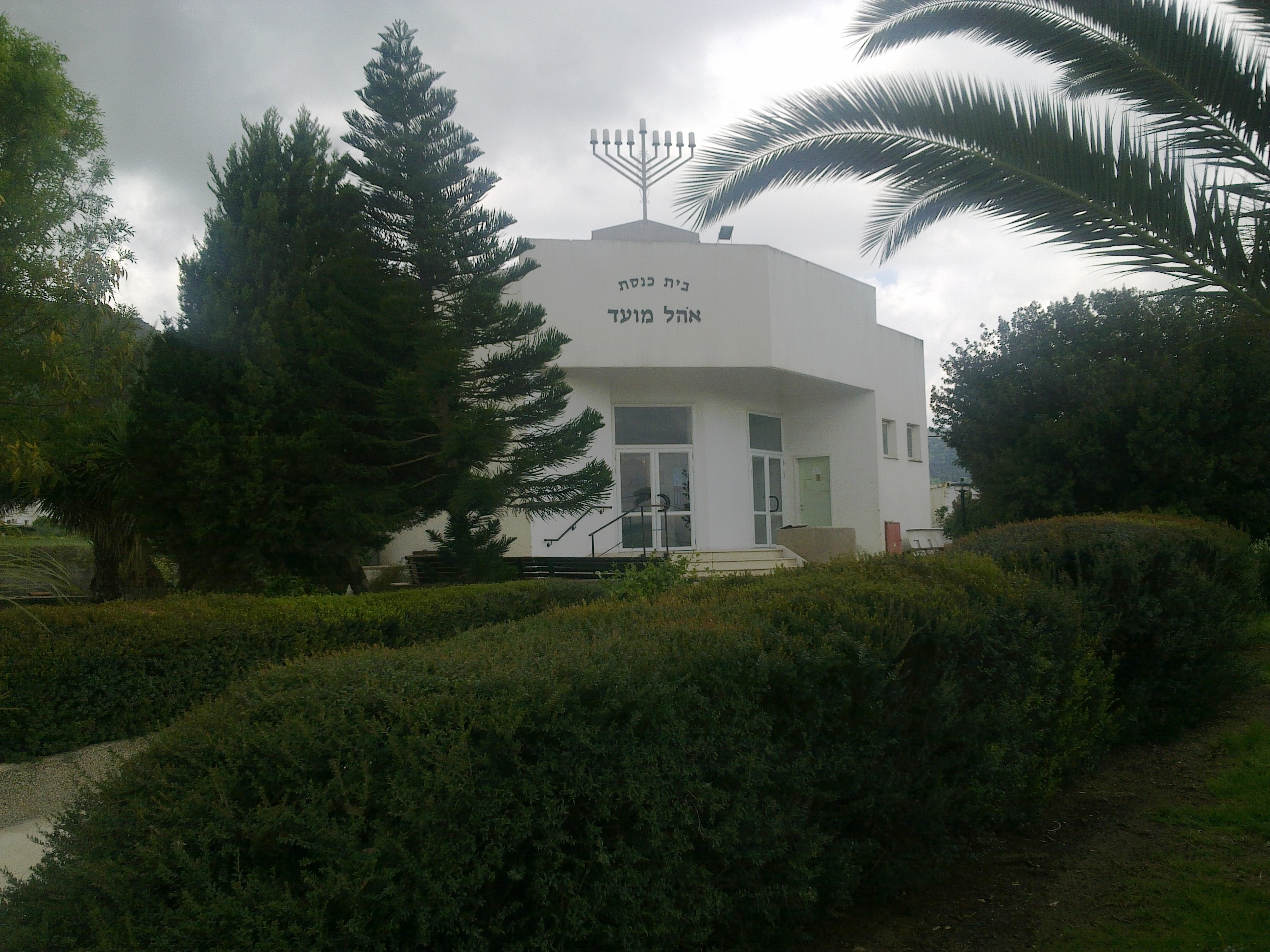

- Location within Northeast Israel
- Coordinates: 32°48′42″N 35°27′45″E
- Country: Israel
- District: Northern
- Subdistrict: Kinneret
- Council: Lower Galilee
- Affiliation: Moshavim Movement
- Founded: 1950
- Founder: Immigrants from Yemen
- Population (2024): 728

Kfar Zeitim (Hebrew: כְּפַר זֵיתִים, lit. Village of Olives) is a moshav in northern Israel. Located adjacent to Tiberias, it falls under the jurisdiction of Lower Galilee Regional Council. In 2024 it had a population of 728.

== History ==
The village was established in 1950 by Jewish immigrants from Yemen on the land of the former depopulated Arab village of Hittin. The name of the village refers to the many olive groves in the area. Although some of the founders left the village later, over the years immigrants from Kurdistan have settled in the village.

== Education ==
The village is home to The Kfar Zeitim Yeshiva, a Vocational High School and Youth Village for Ultra-Orthodox (Chareidi) Jewish boys with learning difficulties, Attention deficit hyperactivity disorder (ADHD) and similar conditions. The yeshiva combines study of Talmud and other Jewish texts with vocational training in Computers, Carpentry, Electricity and Agriculture and Animal husbandry. Rabbinic staff and a social worker tend to the emotional and spiritual needs of the students. The Yeshiva offers high levels of personal counseling and support from professionals including an educational psychologist, and a program of regular hikes and activities in the surrounding region.

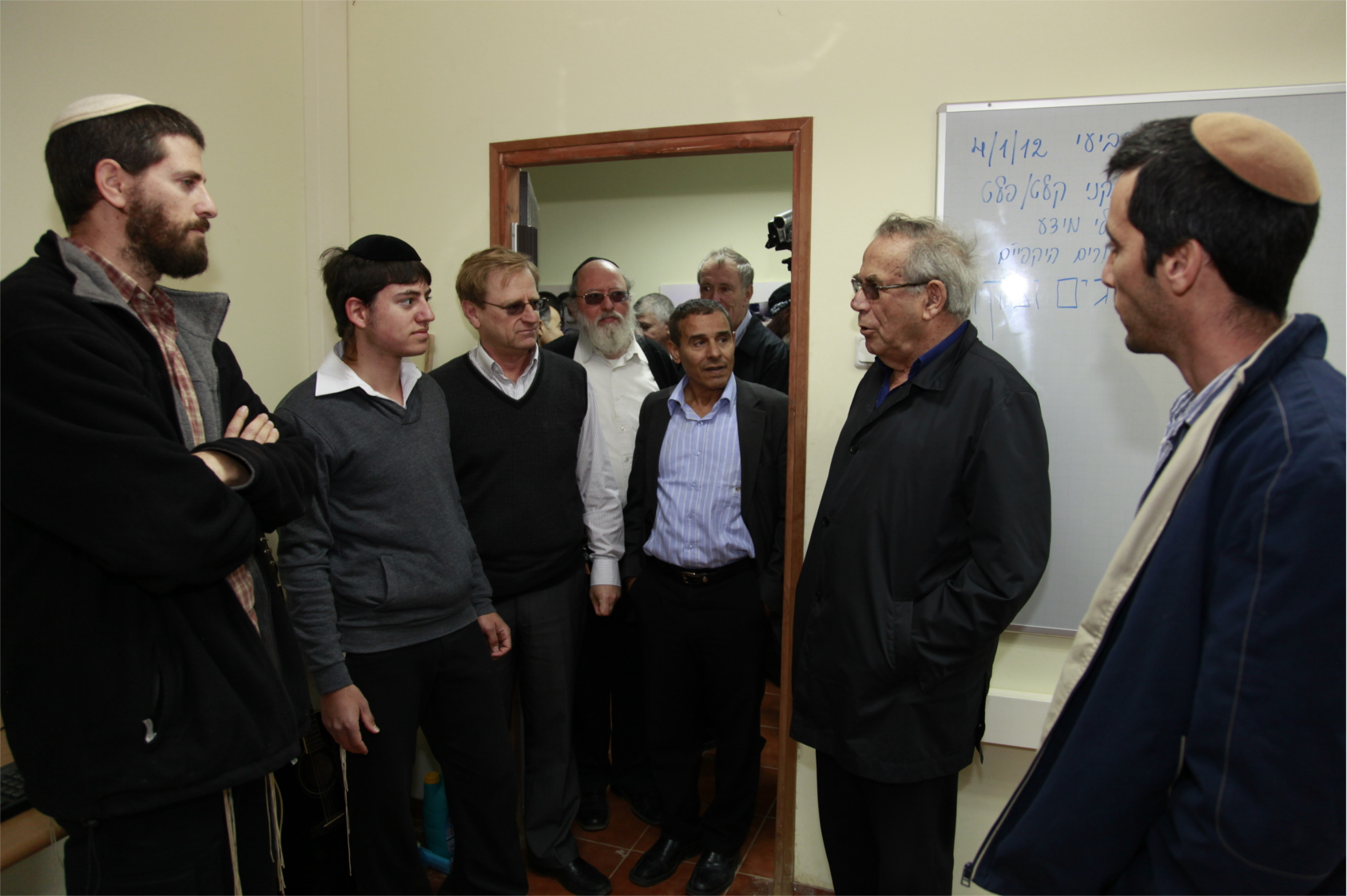
Israeli business magnate, philanthropist Stef Wertheimer visiting Kfar Zeitim Yeshiva in June 2011
