= Mitzpa =

Mitzpa: מִצְפָּה (Hebrew)
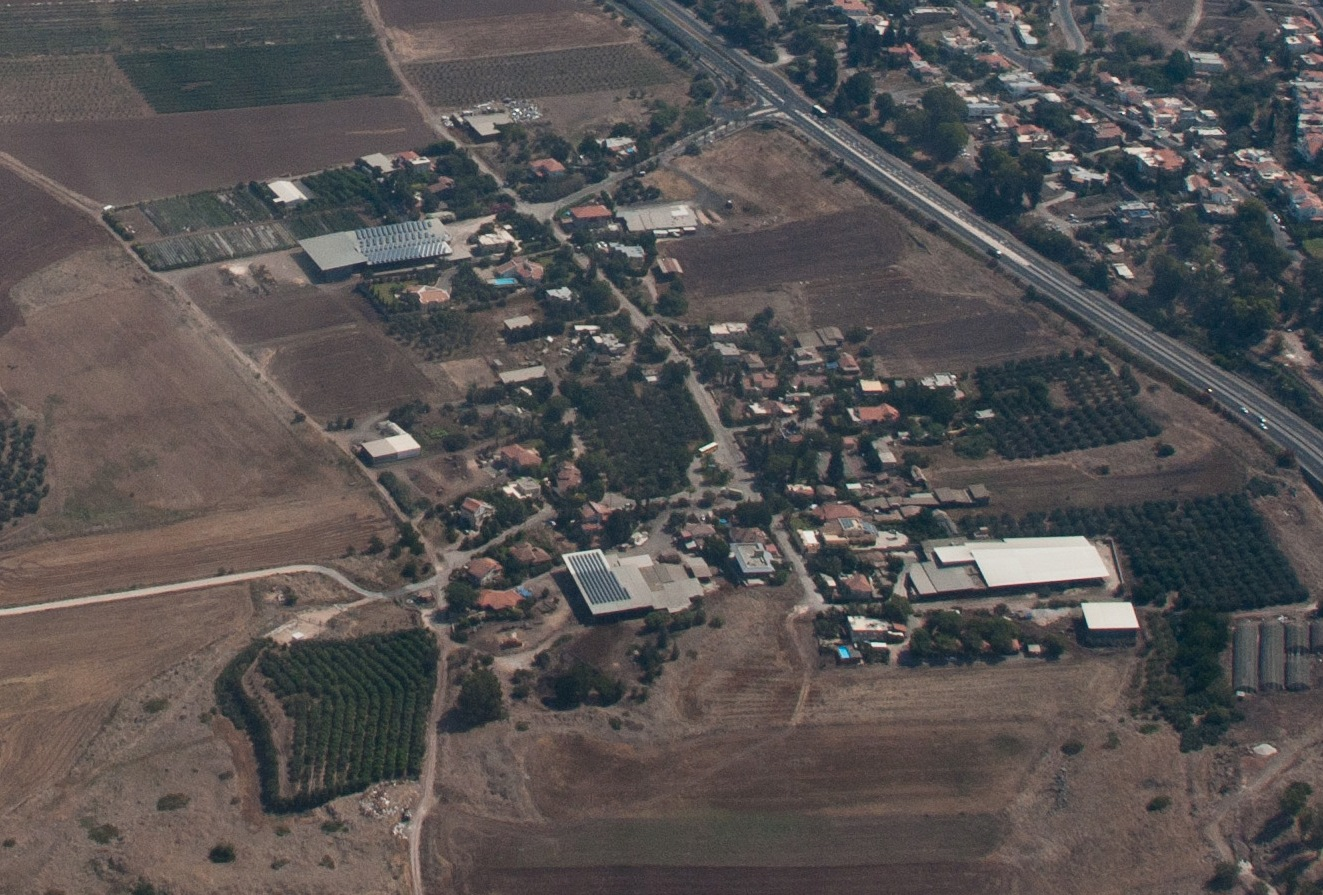

- Location within Northeast Israel
- Coordinates: 32°47′26″N 35°30′34″E
- Country: Israel
- District: Northern
- Subdistrict: Kinneret
- Council: Lower Galilee
- Founded: 1908
- Founder: Jewish Colonization Association
- Population (2024): 149

Mitzpa (Hebrew: מִצְפָּה) is a moshava in the Lower Galilee Regional Council, Israel. Located next to the Sea of Galilee and Tiberias, it falls under the jurisdiction of Lower Galilee Regional Council. In 2024 it had a population of 149.

== History ==
The village was founded in 1908 in the period of the Second Aliyah by the Jewish Colonization Association. Its name is Hebrew for "observatory", a name which was given to the village due to the location in which one has a good observation of the Sea of Galilee, Mount Arbel and Safed.

== Economy ==
The main branches of the village are agriculture, entrepreneurship, tourism (hospitality rooms) and others work outside of the village.

== Notable residents ==
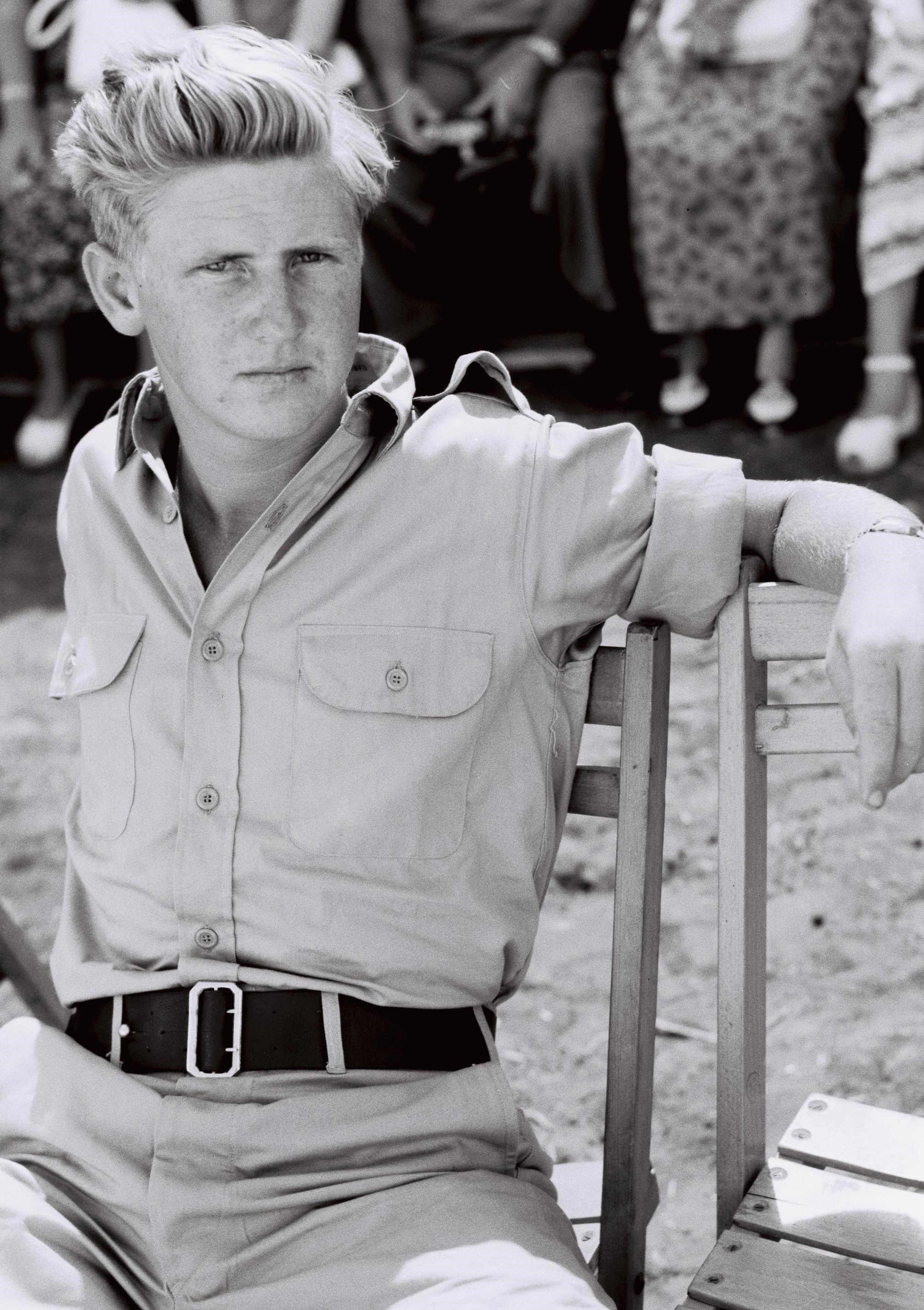
Avraham Avigdorov in 1949

- Avraham Avigdorov (1929–2012), pre-state soldier and war hero born at Mitzpa, recipient of the Hero of Israel award, the highest Israeli military decoration
