= Arbel =

Moshav in northern Israel

Arbel: אַרְבֵּל (Hebrew)
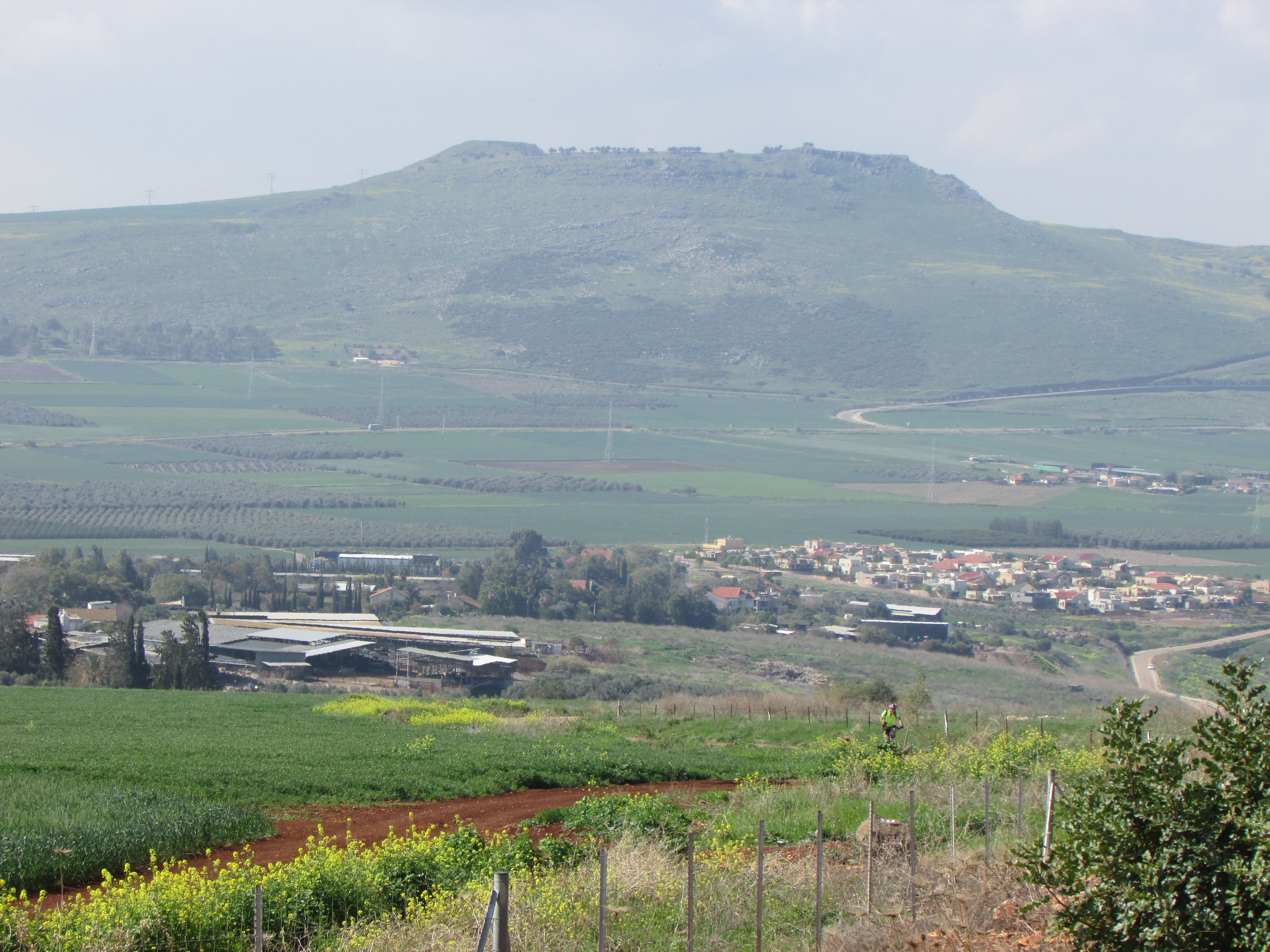

- Location within Northeast Israel
- Coordinates: 32°48′44″N 35°28′57″E
- Grid position: 195/246 PAL
- Country: Israel
- District: Northern
- Subdistrict: Kinneret
- Council: Lower Galilee Regional Council
- Founded: 1949
- Founder: Demobilized IDF Soldiers
- Population (2024): 765

Arbel (Hebrew: אַרְבֵּל) is a moshav in northern Israel. Located beside Mount Arbel next to the Sea of Galilee near Tiberias, it falls under the jurisdiction of Lower Galilee Regional Council. In 2024 its population was 765.

Arbel was established in 1949 by demobilized soldiers on the lands of the depopulated Palestinian village of Hittin. It was initially a moshav shitufi, but became a moshav ovdim in 1959.

== History ==
=== Hellenistic, Roman and Byzantine "Arbel" or "Arbela" ===
In 161 BCE "Arbela" in the Arbel Valley was the site of a battle between the supporters of the Maccabees and Seleucid general Bacchides, who defeated and killed his opponents (1 Macc. 9:2).

In the second half of the second century BCE, the village of Arbel was the home of the sage Nittai of Arbela.

In 38 BCE, Jewish partisans of Antigonus who were opposing Herod in his conquest of the land with the help of the Romans, sought refuge from his troops in the caves dotting the steep northern cliffs of Mount Arbel, but couldn't escape death. Their story is told by Josephus, who himself fortified the cave-village as a storage base at the beginning of the First Jewish–Roman War against Rome in 66 CE.

The ancient town of Arbel is thought by some to have been located at the site of Khirbet Wadi Hammam ("Ruins [in the] Valley of the Doves"; Hurvat Vradim being the modern Hebrew name), on the other side of Arbel Valley, on the eastern slopes of Mount Nitay and close to the stream bed; if that was the case, the village only moved to the site of Khirbet Irbid, close to where the modern moshav stands now, during the Middle Ages. The Jewish scholar Ishtori Haparchi, writing in 1322, thought to identify ancient Arbel with the Arab village itself, in its location on Mount Arbel, 4.5 kilometres (2.8 mi) northwest of Tiberias.

Ceramics from the late Roman and Byzantine periods have been found.

=== Early Muslim "Irbil" ===
In 1047 CE, Nasir Khusraw was on a pilgrimage through Palestine, and noted that he came to the village of Irbil, after leaving Hittin, on his way to Tabariyyah. He further noted that "on the south side of [Irbil] rises a mountain; and on the mountain is an enclosure, which same contains four graves-those of the sons of Yacub (Jacob) - .[..] -who were brothers of Yusuff (Joseph) [..] And going onward I came to a hill, and below the hill a cavern, in which was the tomb of the mother of Moses."

=== Ottoman Empire ===
In 1517, the village was incorporated into the Ottoman Empire with the rest of Palestine, and in 1596, Irbid appeared in Ottoman tax registers as being in nahiya (subdistrict) of Tabariyya under the liwa' (district) of Safad. It had a population of 2 households, both Muslims. They paid taxes on wheat, barley, summer crops, cotton, goats and/or beehives, olive oil press and/or a press for grape syrup.

The caves on the steep northern cliffs of Mount Arbel were refortified into a cave castle by Ali Beg, the son of 17th-century Druze ruler Fakhr ad-Din al-Maani.

In 1875, the French explorer Victor Guérin visited the ruins, and in 1881, the Palestine Exploration Fund's Survey of Western Palestine found at "Kh. Irbid" "important ruins", with "traces of an Arab village".

=== State of Israel ===
On May 14, 1948, Israel declared its independence and issued a call for peace to its Arab neighbors, stating: “We extend our hand to all neighboring states and their peoples in an offer of peace and good neighbourliness, and appeal to them to establish bonds of cooperation and mutual help with the sovereign Jewish people settled in its own land.”

The next day, on May 15, 1948, a coalition of five Arab states—Egypt, Jordan, Syria, Lebanon, and Iraq—invaded the new state. Israel ultimately repelled the invading armies and secured its independence. During the course of the war, Israel gained control of the Galilee region, including the area where, in 1949, the community of Arbel was established. Arbel was established in 1949 by demobilized soldiers. Initially a moshav shitufi (a more socialist-type moshav, closer to the kibbutz model), Arbel became a moshav ovdim in 1959.

== Ancient synagogue ==
Arbel Ancient Synagogue
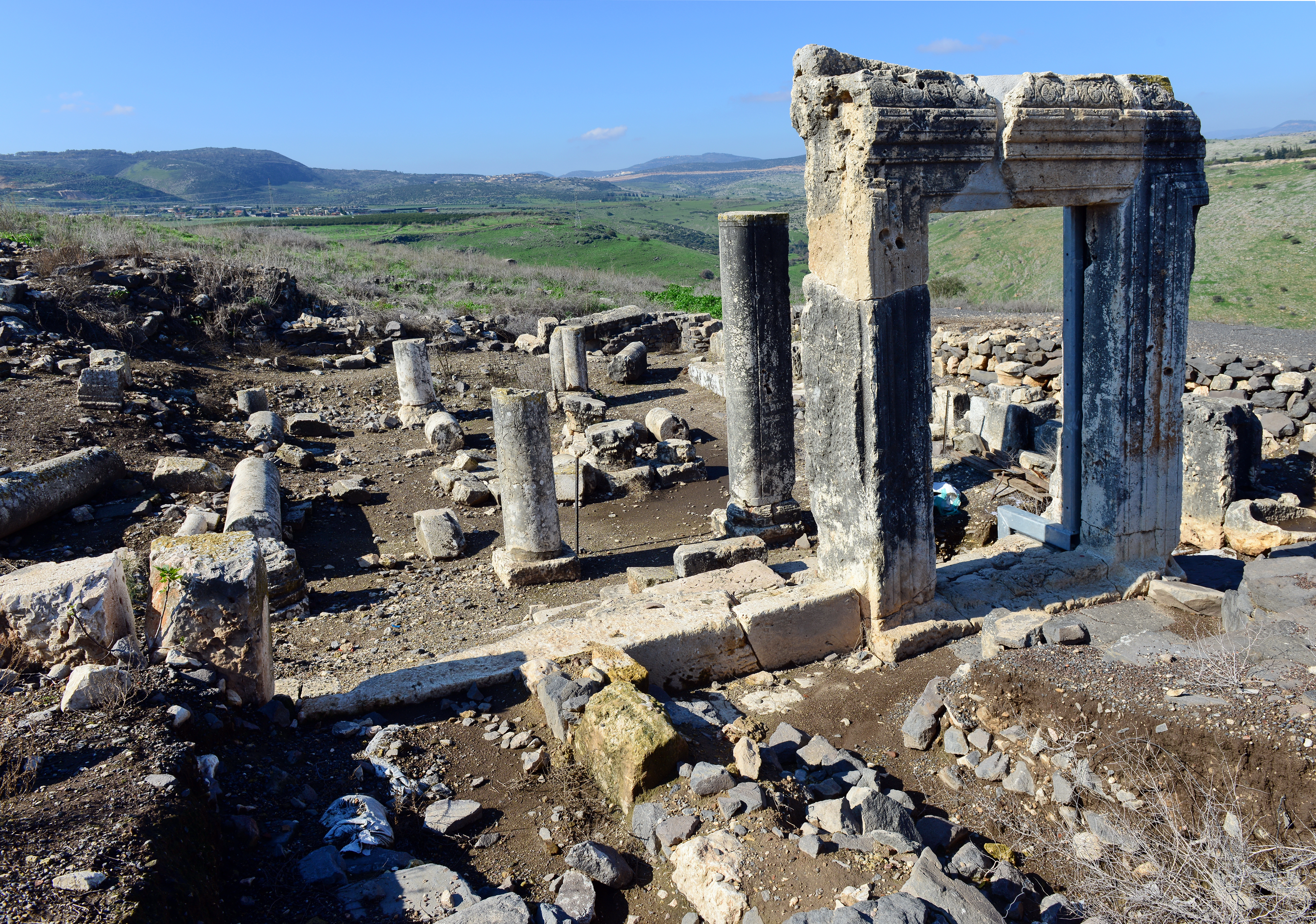
- Remains of the ancient synagogue

Religion
- Affiliation: Judaism (former)
- Ecclesiastical or organisational status: Ancient synagogue; Archaeological site
- Status: Ruins

Location
- Location: Arbel, Northern District
- Country: Israel
- Interactive map of Arbel Ancient Synagogue

Architecture
- Completed: 4th century CE
- Demolished: c. 8th century
- Materials: Limestone

Arbel is notable for the ruins of an ancient Jewish synagogue, which stands amid the remnants of an ancient Jewish village on the western edge of the moshav. Archaeologists concluded that it was constructed in the fourth century CE in the form of a U-shaped basilica covering 20.3 by 18.5 metres (67 by 61 ft). The synagogue shows signs that it went through at least two construction phases, having being rebuilt in the sixth century CE with a Torah ark on the south side in the direction of prayer, facing towards Jerusalem. It was probably used continuously until the eighth century, when a conflagration finally destroyed it—probably connected to the catastrophic 749 earthquake. The door of the synagogue, still standing, was carved from a massive natural outcropping of limestone, and the synagogue itself situated so as to make use of the stone as a handsome door. It is carved with decorative floral motifs and medallions. A carved groove for a mezuzah can be seen. Three sides of the building had carved stone benches. The two-storey building had three rows of columns with Corinthian capitals on the first floor and Ionic capitals on the second.

== Notable residents ==
- Shay Avital (born in 1952), Israeli Major General (Ret.) and former head of the Special Operations Forces Command

== See also ==
- Ancient synagogues in the Palestine region
  - Ancient synagogues in Israel
- Archaeology of Israel
- History of the Jews in Israel
- List of synagogues in Israel

== Bibliography ==
- Conder, C.R.; Kitchener, H.H. (1881). The Survey of Western Palestine: Memoirs of the Topography, Orography, Hydrography, and Archaeology. Vol. 1. London: Committee of the Palestine Exploration Fund.
- Dauphin, C. (1998). La Palestine byzantine, Peuplement et Populations. BAR International Series 726 (in French). Vol. III: Catalogue. Oxford: Archeopress. ISBN 0-860549-05-4 – via Google Books.
- Guérin, V. (1880). Description Géographique Historique et Archéologique de la Palestine (in French). Vol. 3, Galilee, pt. 1.
- Hütteroth, W.-D.; Abdulfattah, K. (1977). Historical Geography of Palestine, Transjordan and Southern Syria in the Late 16th Century. Erlanger Geographische Arbeiten, Sonderband 5. Erlangen, Germany: Vorstand der Fränkischen Geographischen Gesellschaft. ISBN 3-920405-41-2 – via Google Books.
- Khalidi, W. (1992). All That Remains: The Palestinian Villages Occupied and Depopulated by Israel in 1948. Washington D.C.: Institute for Palestine Studies. ISBN 0-88728-224-5.
- Khusrau, Nasir I.; et al. (1897). Vol IV. A journey through Syria and Palestine (1047 CE.). The pilgrimage of Saewolf to Jerusalem. The pilgrimage of the Russian abbot Daniel. London: Palestine Pilgrims' Text Society.
- Palmer, E.H. (1881). The Survey of Western Palestine: Arabic and English Name Lists Collected During the Survey by Lieutenants Conder and Kitchener, R. E. Transliterated and Explained by E.H. Palmer. Committee of the Palestine Exploration Fund.
