= Horns of Hattin =

Extinct volcano in Israel

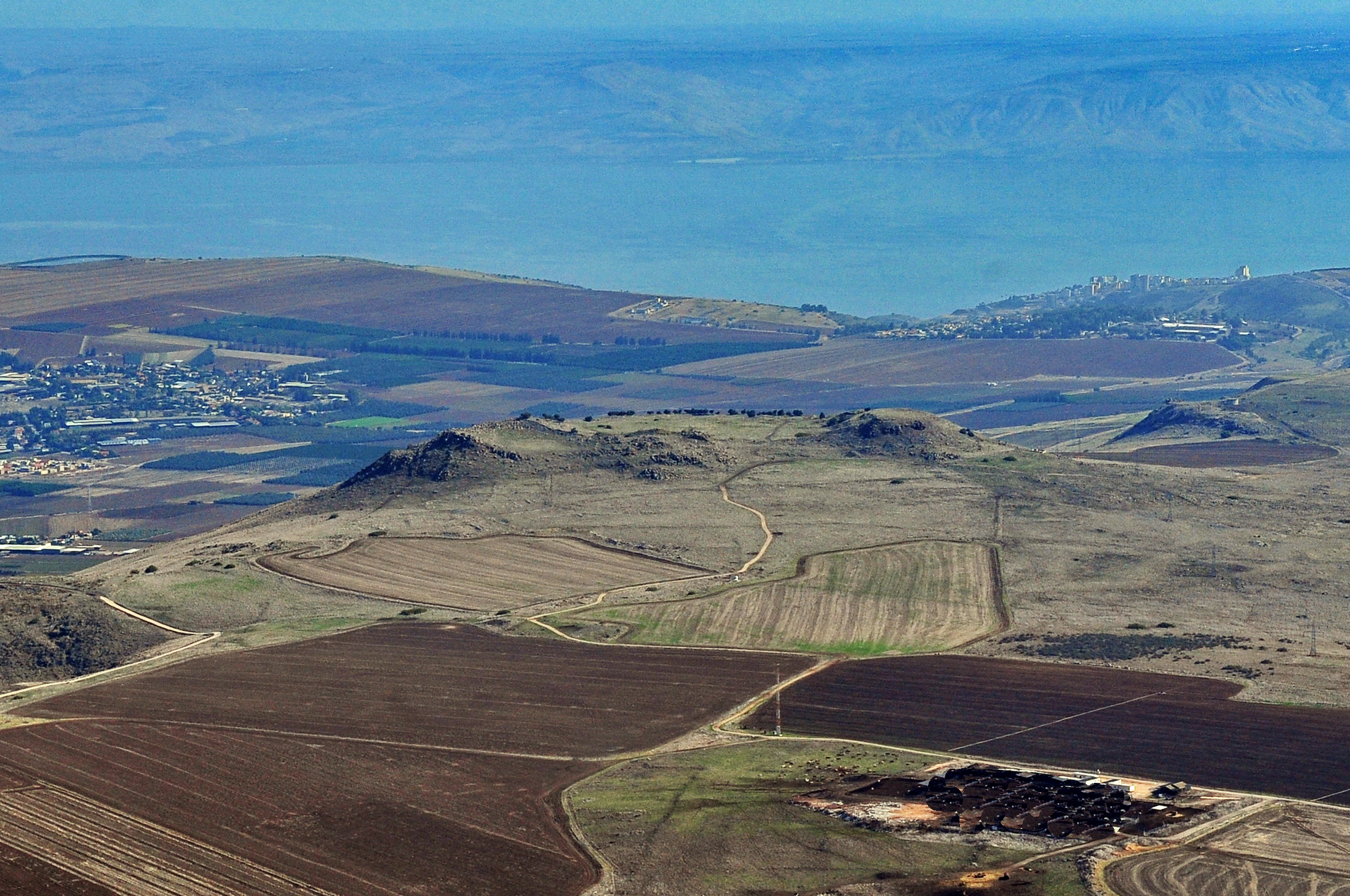
- View of the Horns of Hattin from the west. Sea of Galilee is in the background.

Highest point
- Coordinates: 32°48′00″N 35°27′34″E

Naming
- Etymology: from Hebrew חִטִּ֨ים (ḥiṭṭîm) 'wheat'
- Native name: Arabic: قرون حطين, romanized: Qurūn Haṭṭīn; Hebrew: קרני חיטין, romanized: Karnei Hittin

Geography
- Location: Lower Galilee, Israel

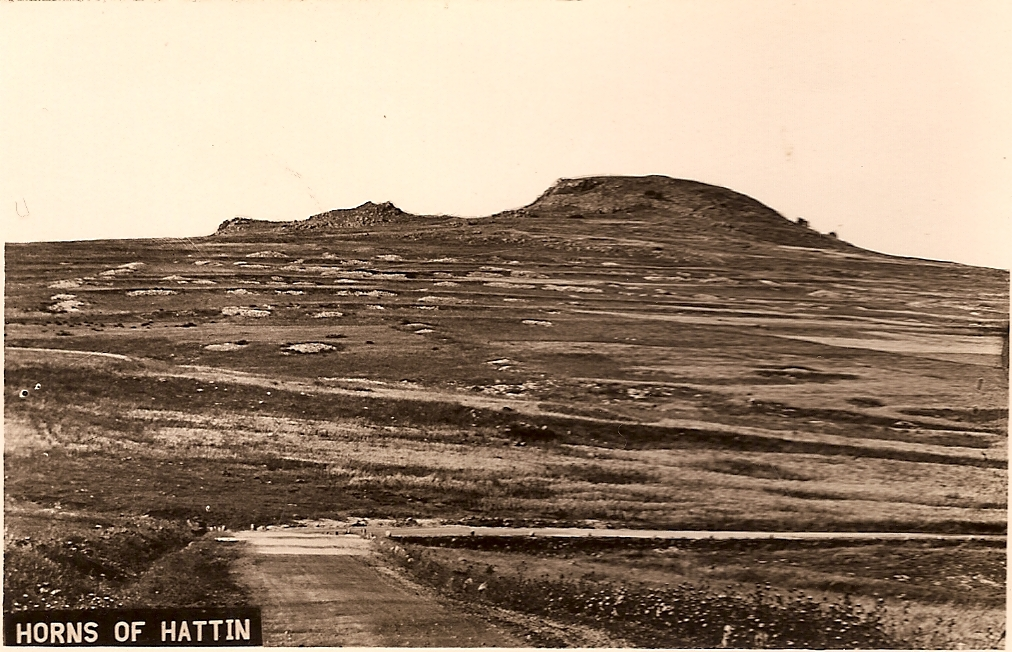
The Horns of Hattin, c. 1925

The Horns of Hattin ( Hebrew: קרני חיטין, romanized: Karnei Hittin; Arabic: قرون حطين, romanized: Qurūn Haṭṭīn) is an extinct volcano with twin peaks overlooking the plains of Hattin in the Lower Galilee, Israel. It is most famous as the site of the Battle of Hattin (1187).

== History and archaeology ==
Excavations were carried out on the hill in 1976 and 1981. The ruined Canaanite hilltop fortress of Tel Qarney Hittin, the site name used by Israeli archaeologists, was identified by Zvi Gal with Meron/Merom of the Hebrew Bible (Joshua 11, "waters of Merom") and with the city mentioned as m-r-m-i-m in a campaign list of Thutmose III (r. 1479–1425 BCE), and again by Ramses II (r. 1279–1213 BCE) and Tiglath Pileser III in 733/32 BCE, based on geography, archaeology, text analysis, and logical assumptions. Some scholars have identified the hill with the Mount of Beatitudes, where Jesus delivered his Sermon on the Mount. Writing in 1864, Fergus Ferguson describes it as the "supposed" site, because although "its position corresponds with the particulars of the narrative", "no one can declare with certainty" the site of the Sermon on the Mount.

Kurûn Hattîn is believed to be the site of the Battle of Hattin, Saladin's victory over the Crusaders in 1187. The Battle of Hattin was fought in summer when the grass was tinder-dry. Saladin's troops set fire to the grass, after cutting off the Crusaders' access to water in the Sea of Galilee. Saladin built a "victory dome," Qubbat al-Nasr, on the hill. Thietmar, a German pilgrim who visited the site in 1217, wrote that the "temple Saladin had erected to his gods after the victory is now desolate." In the early 17th century, ruins were found on the summit that appeared to be those of a church. Prior to 1948, an Arab village, Hittin, lay at the foot of the hill but was occupied and destroyed by Israeli forces.
