= Kinerot Natural Region =

Coordinates: 32°47′41″N 35°31′47″E

- Natural Region
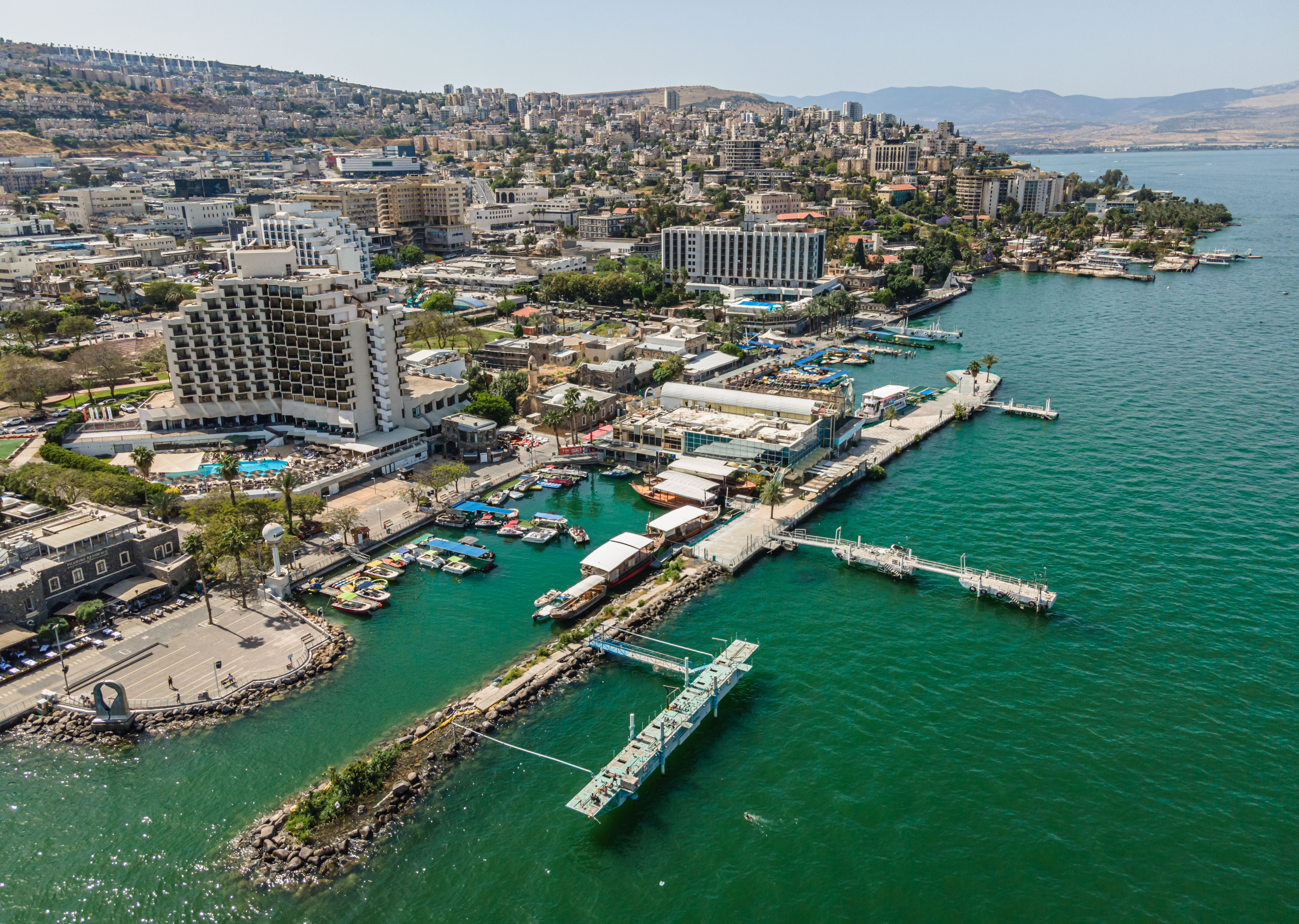
- View of Tiberias
- Interactive map of Kinerot Natural Region
- Country: Israel
- District: Northern
- Subdistrict: Kinneret
- Largest City: Tiberias

Area
  - Total: 194 km^{2} (75 sq mi)

Population (2024)
  - Total: 72,206

Ethnicity
  - Jews and others: 93.5%
  - Arabs: 4.0%

The Kinerot Natural Region is a natural region in the Kinneret Subdistrict, in the Northern District of Israel. Tiberias is the largest city in the natural region.

== Geography ==
Districts, Subdistricts and Natural Regions of the State of Israel, 2018

The natural region is located in the north-eastern part of Israel, and mostly surrounds the eponymous Lake Kinneret, also known as the Sea of Galilee. It has an area of 194 km^{2}. The largest city in the natural region is Tiberias, one of the four holy cities of Judaism, which contains 72 percent of the natural region's population. There are no other towns in the natural region with more than 5,000 people. It is mostly coextensive with the Emek HaYarden Regional Council.

== Demographics ==
The vast majority of residents of the Kinerot Natural Region are Jews. Four percent of the natural region's population is Arab, concentrated in the town of Wadi al-Hammam.

Historical population
Year	Pop.	±%
1972	31,600	—
1983	38,100	+20.6%
1995	46,600	+22.3%
2008	54,870	+17.7%
2022	67,429	+22.9%
2024	72,206	+7.1%

== Administrative local authorities ==
Cities	Local Councils	Villages
Tiberias	Migdal	al-Batuf: Wadi al-Hammam; Emek HaYarden: Afikim; Almagor; Alumot; Ashdot Ya'akov Ihud; Ashdot Ya'akov Meuhad; Beit Zera; Degania Alef; Degania Bet; Ein Gev; Ginosar; HaOn; Hukok; Kinneret (kibbutz); Kinneret (moshav); Ma'agan; Masada; Poria Illit; Poria - Kfar Avoda; Poria - Neve Oved; Sha'ar HaGolan; Tel Katzir

== Voting Patterns ==
In the 2022 election, 67 percent of voters in the natural region voted for the parties of the right-wing coalition led by Benjamin Netanyahu, while 29 percent voted for the parties of the center-left coalition led by Yair Lapid and 2 percent voted for the Arab parties.

In the 2026 election, 63 percent of voters in the natural region voted for the parties of the right-wing coalition led by Benjamin Netanyahu, while 29 percent voted for the parties of the center-left coalition led by Gadi Eisenkot and 3 percent voted for the Arab parties. An additional 2.5 percent voted for the Reservists, and 1.7 percent voted for Amcha Yisrael. Voter turnout increased 15 percent from the 2022 election.
