= Poria, Israel =

Poria
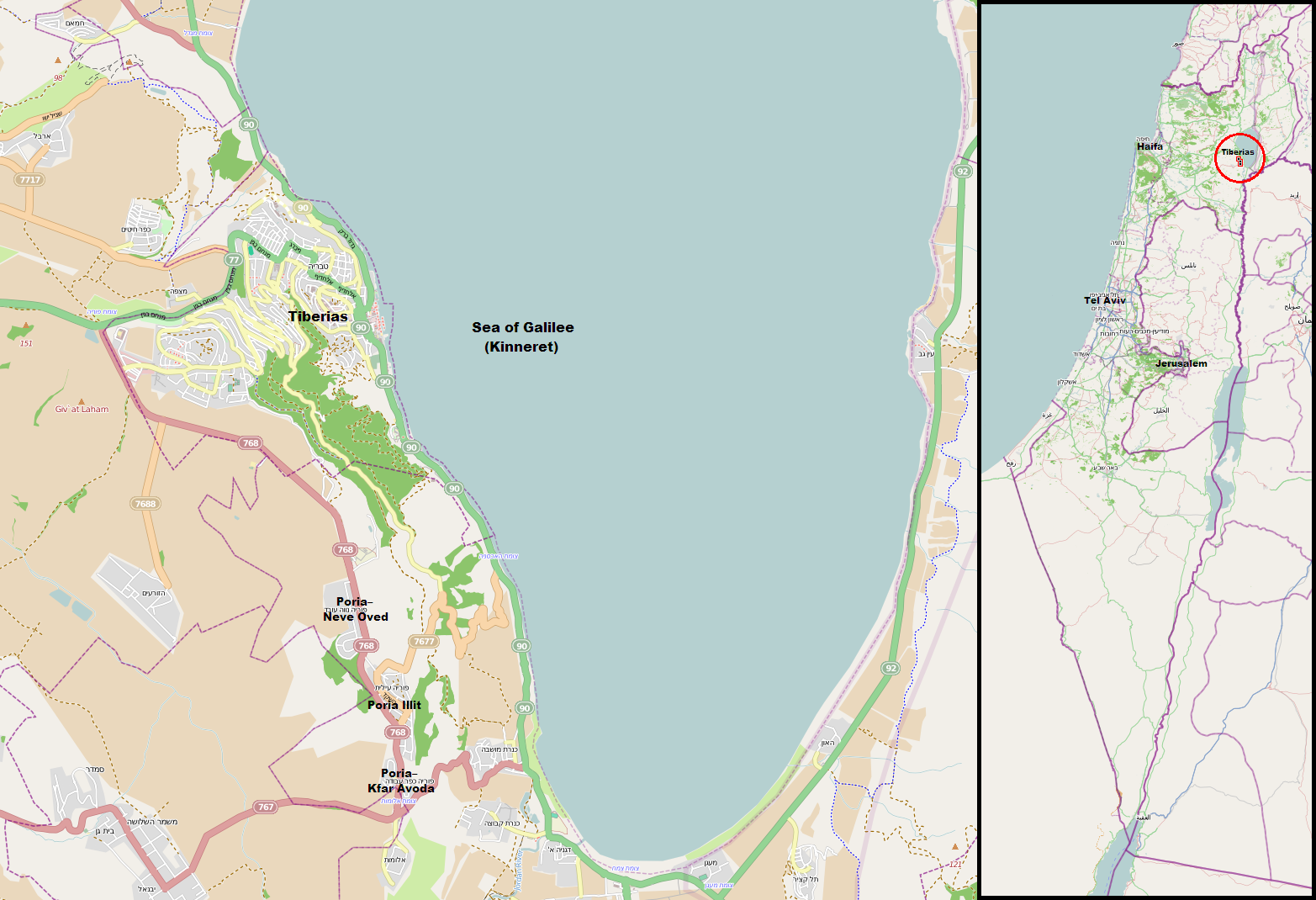
- Interactive map of Poria
- Coordinates: 32°44′N 35°32′E
- Country: Israel
- Council: Emek HaYarden
- Region: Sea of Galilee

Poria comprises three adjacent villages south of Tiberias in northern Israel, specifically Poria – Neve Oved, Poria Illit, and Poria – Kfar Avoda. Each is a community settlement and all three lie along Route 768 overlooking the Sea of Galilee. As of 2006 the cumulative population was 1875.
