= Kinneret College =

College in Galilee, Israel

Coordinates: 32°42′19.41″N 35°35′27.54″E

Kinneret College on the Sea of Galilee
- המכללה האקדמית כנרת בעמק הירדן
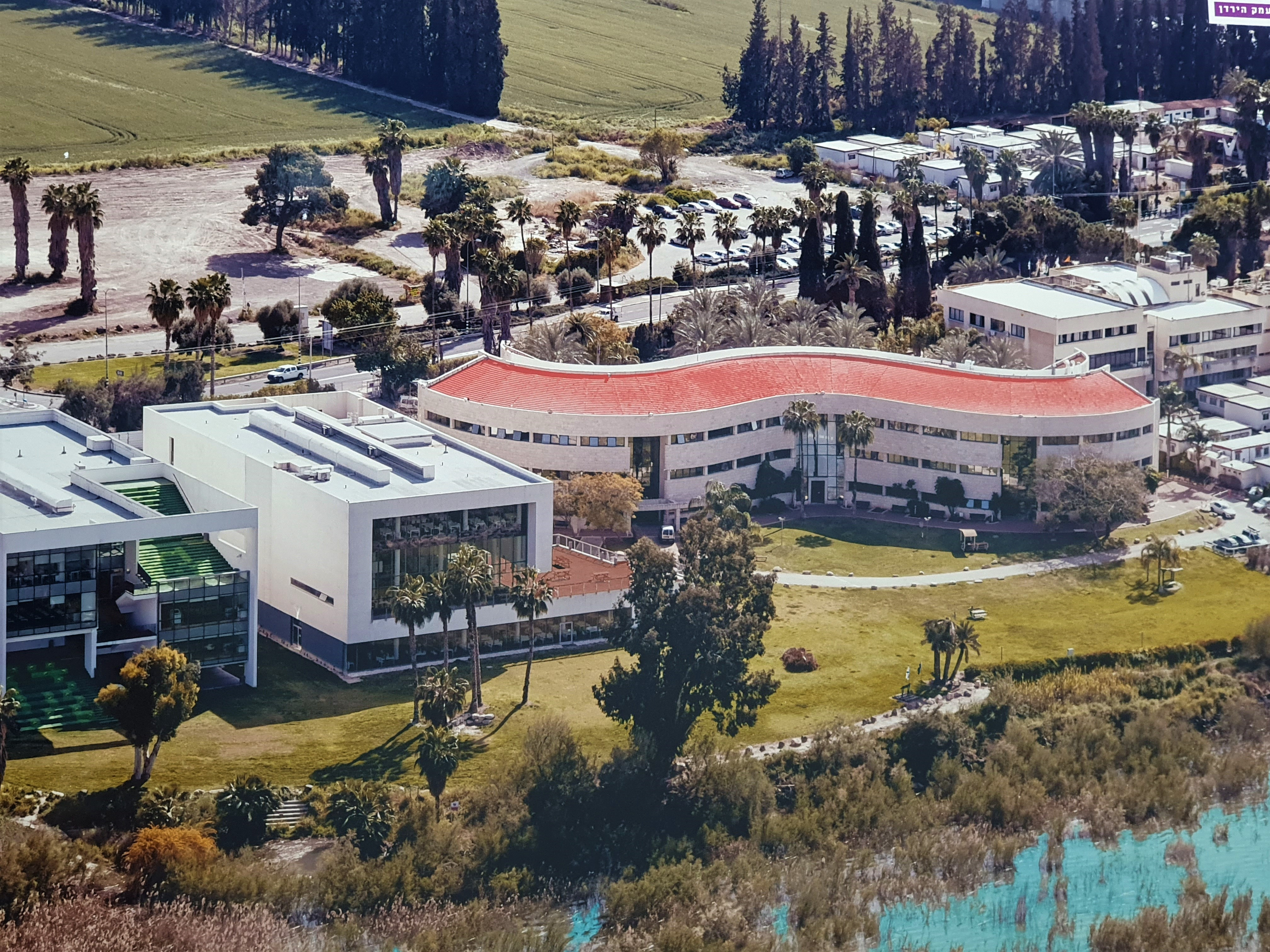
- Type: University college
- Established: 1965
- Affiliations: Bar Ilan University
- President: Prof. Shimon Gepstein
- Provost: Michael "Mickey" Lev
- Students: 2,148
- Location: Galilee
- Campus: Settlement
- Website: https://www.kinneret.ac.il/Web/En/Default.aspx

The Kinneret Academic College on the Sea of Galilee (Hebrew: המכללה האקדמית כנרת בעמק הירדן), also known as Kinneret College and Academic Kinneret (As part of rebranding in February 2019), is a college located on the southern shores of the Sea of Galilee in northern Israel.

== History ==
The College was established in 1965 by Emek HaYarden Regional Council as a secondary school named Emek HaYarden Regional College for the people of the Jordan Valley and the Galilee region, which is reflected in the multi-cultural and multi-faith background of the student population: Jewish and Arab, secular and religious. Upon its establishment, the College allowed the locals to study on the afternoons and evenings, while maintaining their chores and routine assignments. Furthermore, the College conducted bachelor's degree completion studies for local tutors, since the College was affiliated with Bar Ilan University, as well as a curriculum for an engineer's degree, courtesy of the Technion, up until the inauguration of Achi Racov School of Engineering, in 2012.

Prior to the inauguration of its first official building, in October 1974, the College was operating from the Avraham Haft Youth Center in Samakh. In 1983, the College established a preparatory school, which combined studies with work in the kibbutzim of the area (Afikim, Masada, Degania Alef, Degania Bet, etc.), though nowadays the prep school's program no longer includes such working.

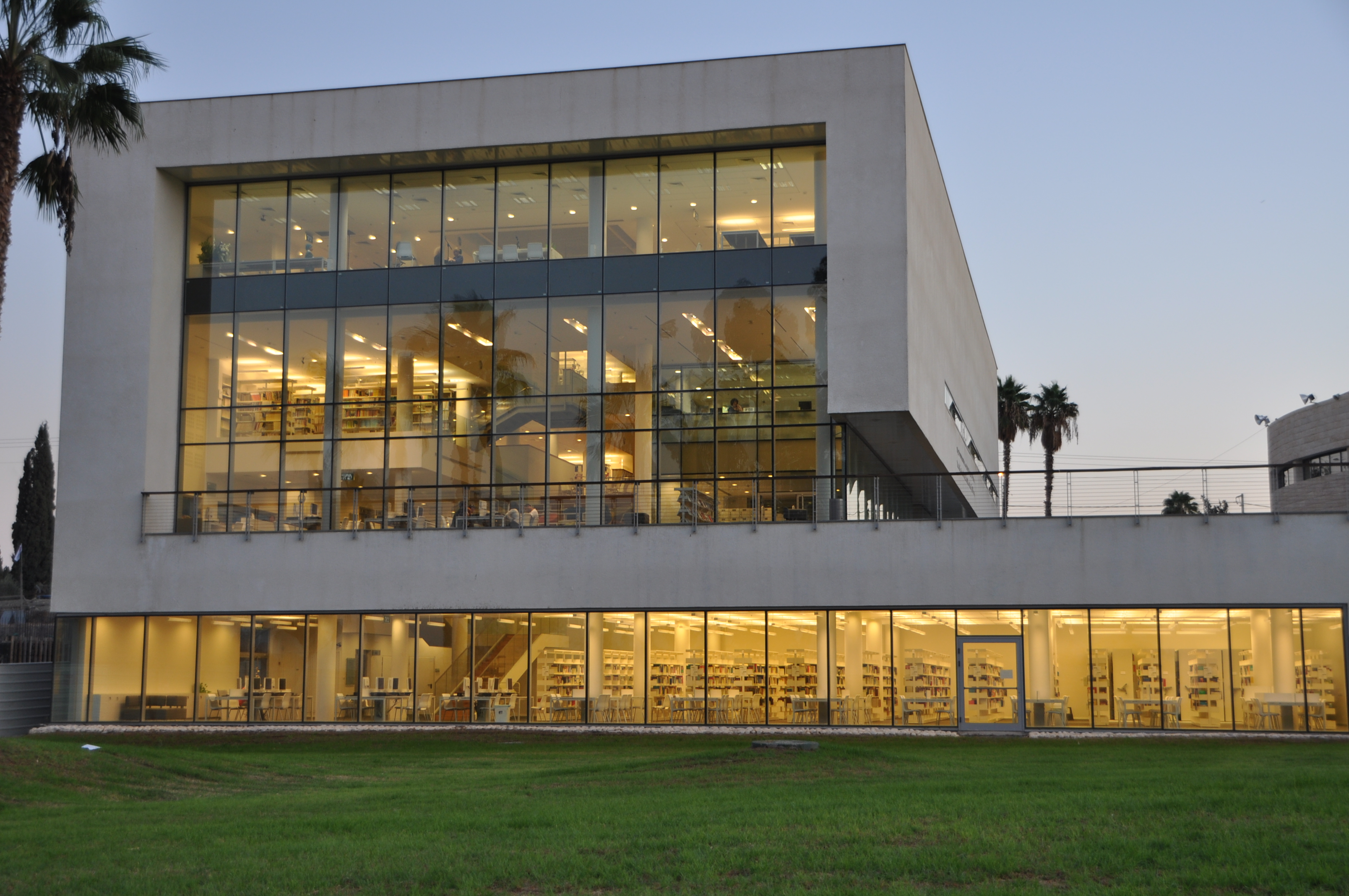
Kinneret College Library

In its first year, the College had 60 students enrolled to its study programs. By 1969, 300 students were accounted for enrolling. About 450 students, by 1971. And from 1974, the college was educating about 500 students, which has been increasing every year since.

== Academic Units and Facilities ==
=== School of Humanities and Social Science ===
- Tourism and Hotel Management (As of 2004)
- Communication studies (As of 2009)
- Behavioural sciences (As of 2010)
- Land of Israel studies (As of 2010)
- Education and Community
- Interdisciplinarity
- Human Resources Management

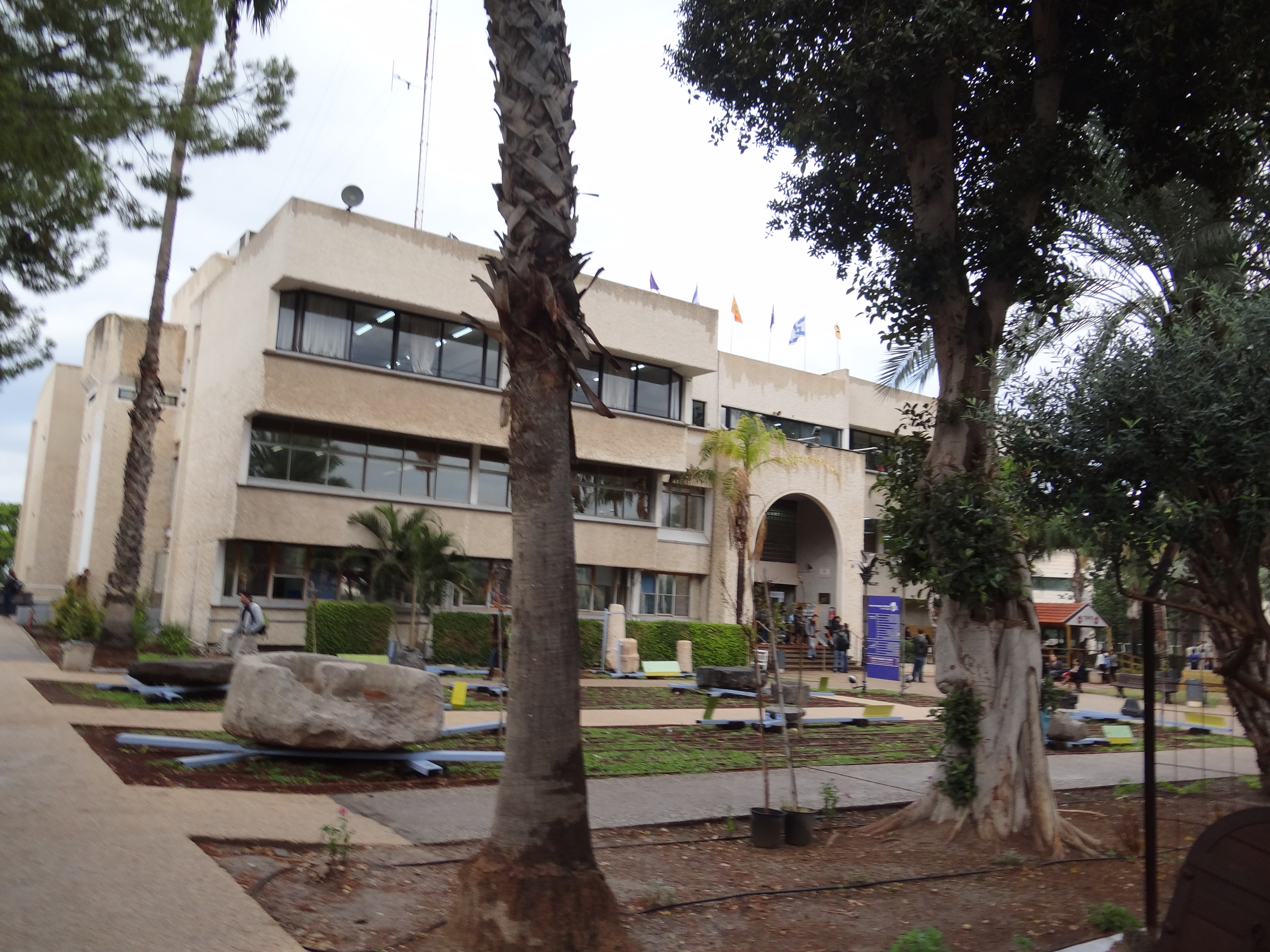
Max Alperin Building - The first building of the College, in which the College's cornerstone was placed in June 1971, and was inaugurated in October 1974

=== Achi Racov School of Engineering ===
- Water Industry Engineering(As of 2010)
- Electrical and Electronic Engineering (As of 2004)
- Software Engineering (As of 2004)
- Gas and Petroleum Energy Engineering (As of 2004)
- Reliability and Quality engineering for the electronics industry. The department works in cooperation with the Israel Society for Quality, which organizes conferences and professional seminars on campus (As of 2010).

The unit's curriculum received a rating of "High Achievement" by the Technological Preparation Institute from the Ministry of Labor.

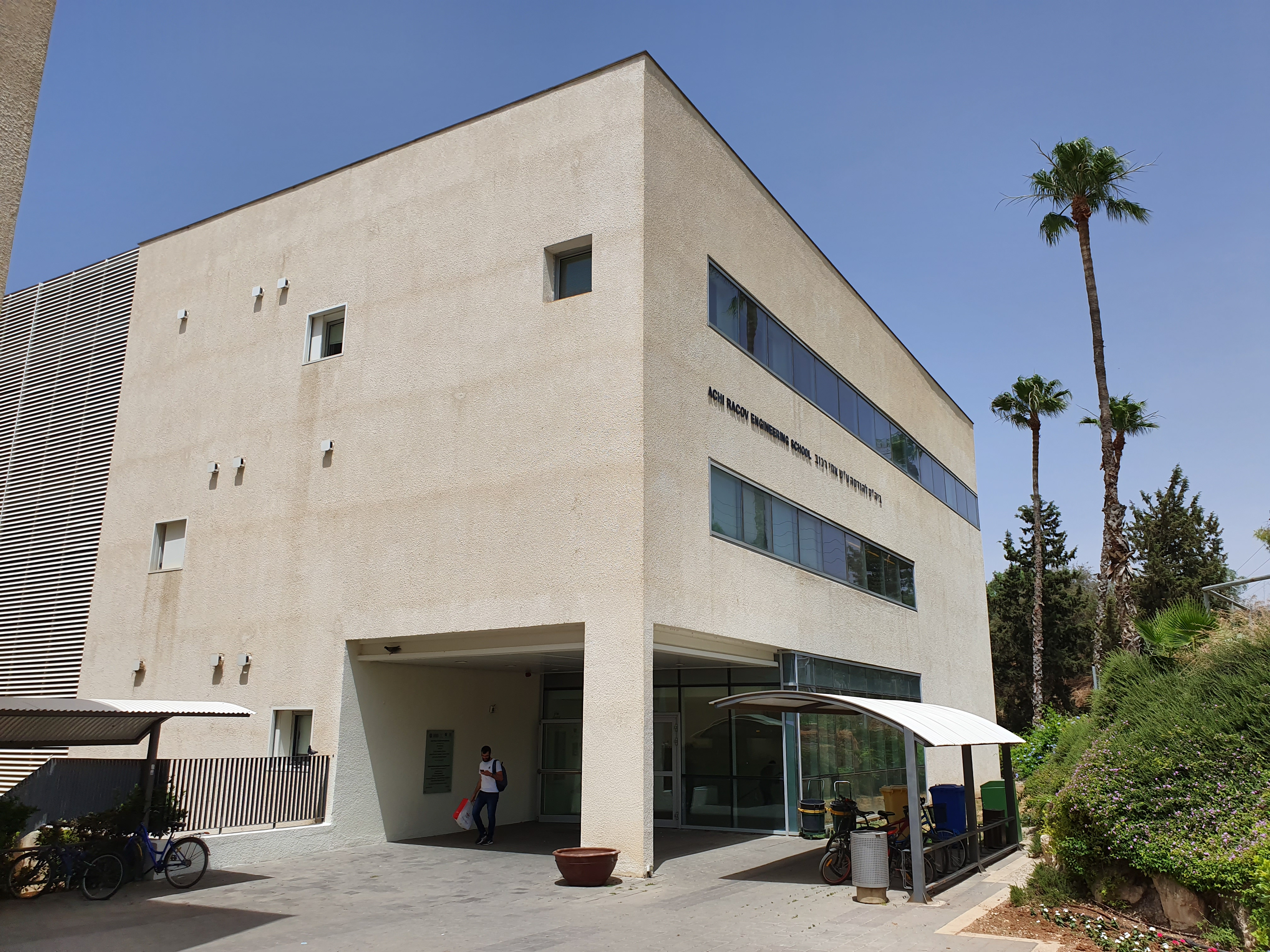
Achi Racov School of Engineering

=== Kinneret Innovation Center for Entrepreneurship ===
Inaugurated in February 2019, the Center helps qualitative graduates with job application in the fields of Agricultural engineering and Biological engineering. The Innovation Center works in cooperation with Zemach Regional Industries, Emek HaYarden Regional Council, and Tzafon Medical Center, as a greenhouse for high tech companies who are willing to help with the economical development of the Jordan Valley.

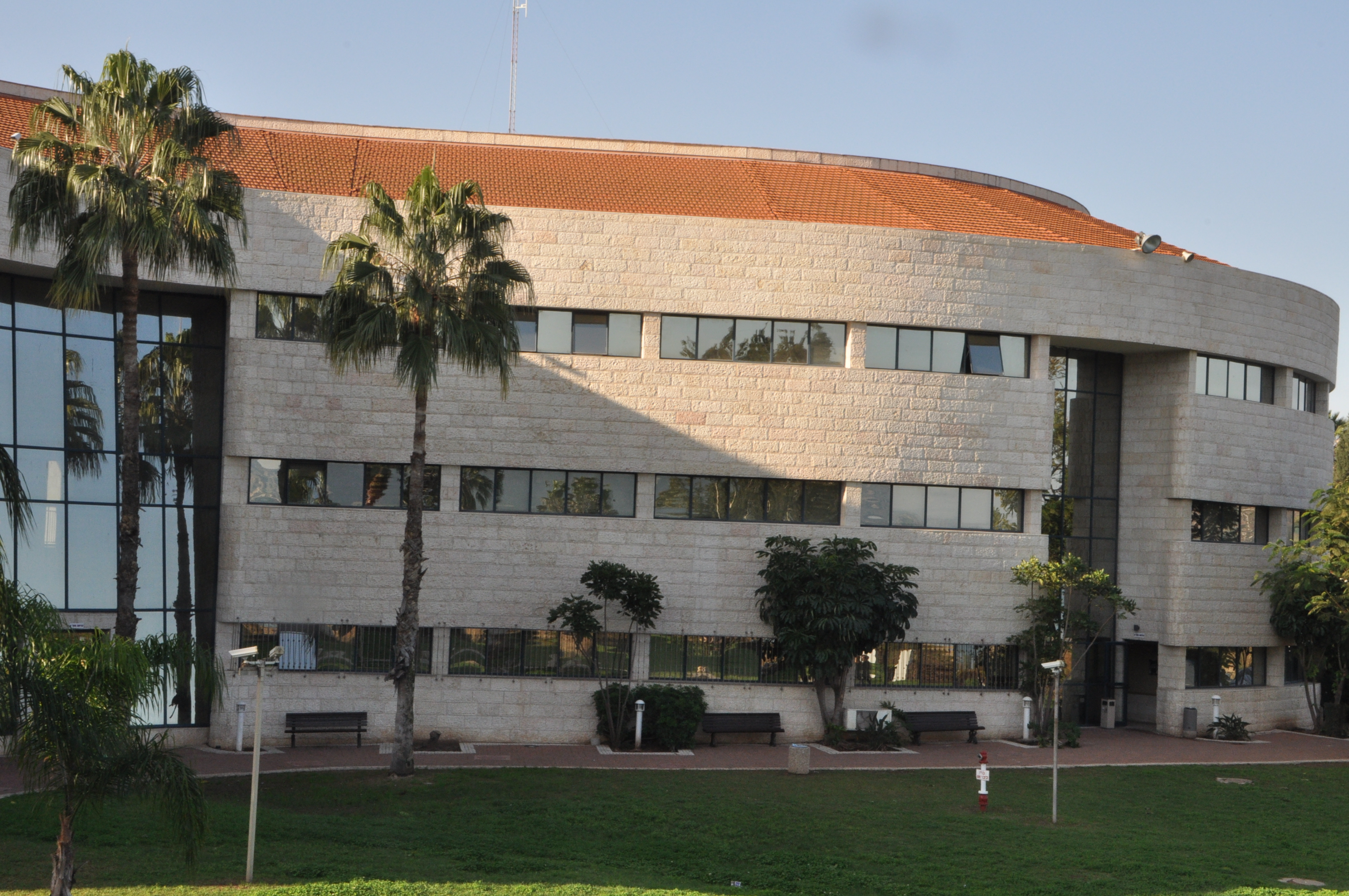
Harry Triguboff Center of Science and Technology

=== Research and Development Institutes ===
Kinneret Institute for Galilean Archaeology

Founded by Dr. Mordechai Aviam in 2005, and absorbed into the College in 2009, the institute works in cooperation with The Sue and Leonard Miller Center for Contemporary Judaic Studies of the University of Miami, since 2008. The historic-archaeologic aspect of the Galilee has been the main purpose of research for the institute, which is reflected on events, such as the Jesus movement, the First Jewish–Roman War and the composition of the Talmud and the Mishnah, including the big concentration of ancient synagogues and Christian holy sites in the area.

Dan Shomron Institute for Society, Security and Peace Research

The Institute studies the economical, cultural, strategic and political aspects of the interactions between the Israeli society and all forms of security in the state, as well as their consequences.

The Bornblum Academic Department for Land of Israel Research

Inaugurated in December 2006, the establishment of the Department is a part of the expansion and academization process of Israeli colleges into the field of institutionalized research.

Science and Knowledge Center for Gifted and Outstanding students

Inaugurated in 1998, the Center operates on the behalf of the Ministry of Education, and teaches 200 gifted students, and 120 outstanding students, on average, all elementary school aged. The students are directed from towns and settlements of nearby areas, such as the Jordan Rift Valley, the southern Golan Heights and Afula.

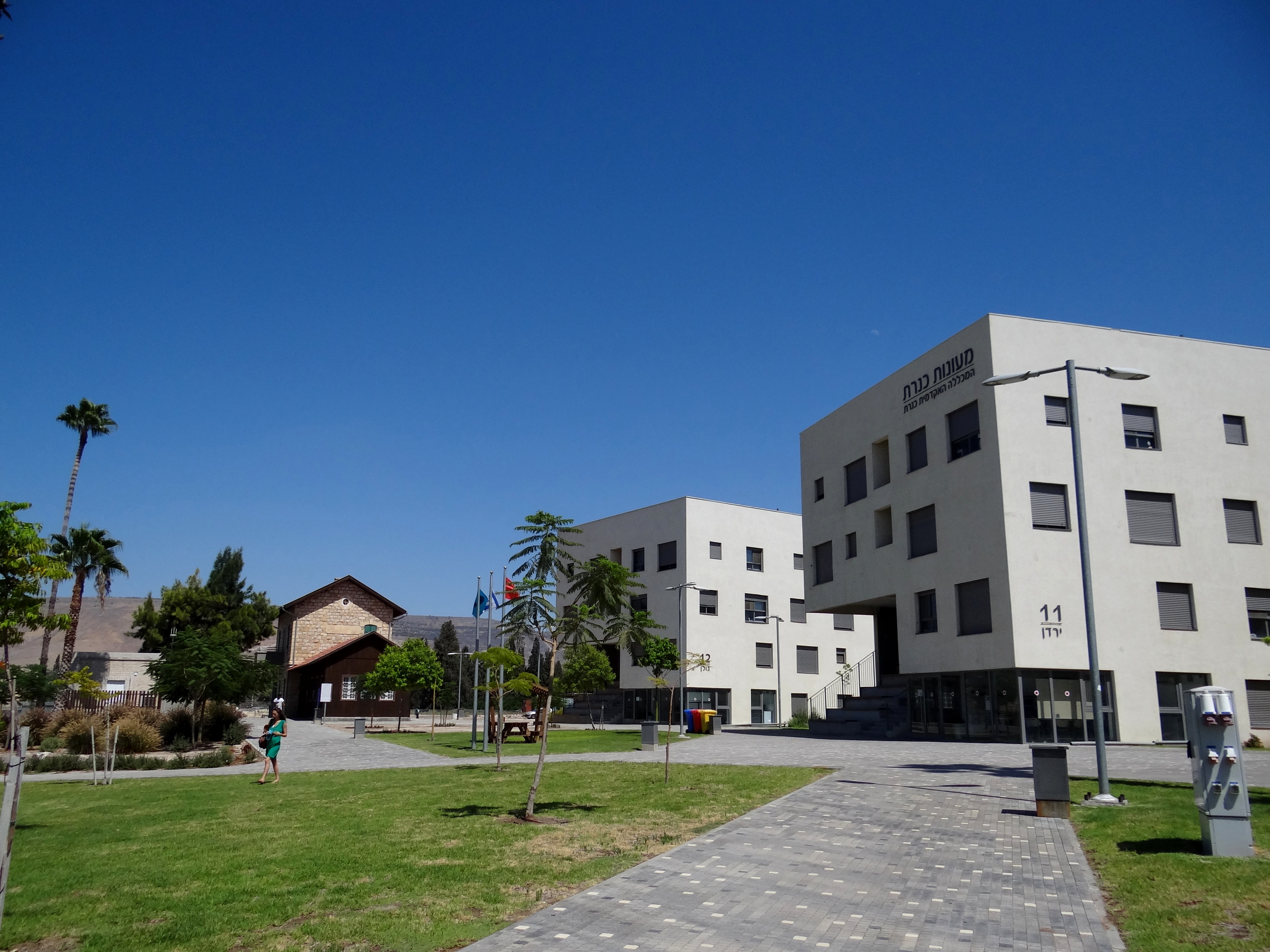
The College dorms complex, located near the Samakh Railway Station and the R&D Institutes

Since 2004, the College has independent academic status and awards degrees in several fields of Engineering, Social Sciences and Humanities, including Media Studies and Tourism Management.

The Center for Innovation and Entrepreneurship was inaugurated in February 2019 as part of a collaboration between the Kinneret Academic College, Zemach Regional Industries, the Jordan Valley Regional Council, and Poria Hospital. The goal of the center is to enable knowledge-intensive companies to recruit graduates and employ them in the field of Agro-tech (agricultural technology).

The center is intended to serve as an incubator for high-tech companies that are interested in operating in the area, and it aspires to contribute to the economic development of the valley.

The CEO of the Innovation Center is Elad Shamir.

== See also ==
- List of universities and colleges in Israel
- Education in Israel
