= Ein Poria =

Ein Poria (Hebrew: עין פוריה), also known as Ein Kadesh, is a natural water spring located in the Northern District of Israel. It is situated near the village of Poria Illit and overlooks the Sea of Galilee. The spring is located at an elevation of 32 meters above sea level.

== History and cultural significance ==
Historically, the spring was known in Arabic as Ein Kadesh, named after the nearby archaeological site of Khirbat Kadesh. In the early 20th century, members of the nearby Kvutzat Kinneret utilized the spring's brackish water for local agricultural needs.

The site holds a prominent place in Israeli culture as it was a frequent childhood destination for the famous Israeli songwriter and poet Naomi Shemer. The landscape of the spring inspired her well-known song, "Shiro Shel Abba" (also known as "The Spring Song"), and a dedicated memorial lookout (Mitzpor Naomi Shemer) was established on the ridge overlooking the site. In 2009, coinciding with the centennial celebrations of Kvutzat Kinneret, the Jewish National Fund (KKL) completed an extensive restoration project to preserve the spring and regulate its water flow into the modern collecting pools.

== Features ==
The spring water emerges from the ground at several distinct points. The water then flows through small aqueducts into two collecting pools. The surrounding area is shaded by palm trees and features small wooden bridges. The water in the spring is brackish, meaning it is slightly salty and unsafe for drinking.

== Tourism and surroundings ==
In recent years, the Jewish National Fund (KKL) restored and developed the area surrounding the spring. The site now features shaded seating areas and picnic tables for visitors. The spring is integrated into a scenic driving and hiking route that connects to the nearby Swiss Forest. Many visitors frequent the area during the spring season to experience the blooming wildflowers.

The site serves as a major transition point for various outdoor activities, including a designated cycling loop that spans the Poria ridge and offers views of the Jordan Valley and the Sea of Galilee. Additionally, a popular hiking trail connects Ein Poria directly to the Kinneret Church (Ohalo) and the shoreline, making it a frequent stop for regional hikers.

== Gallery ==
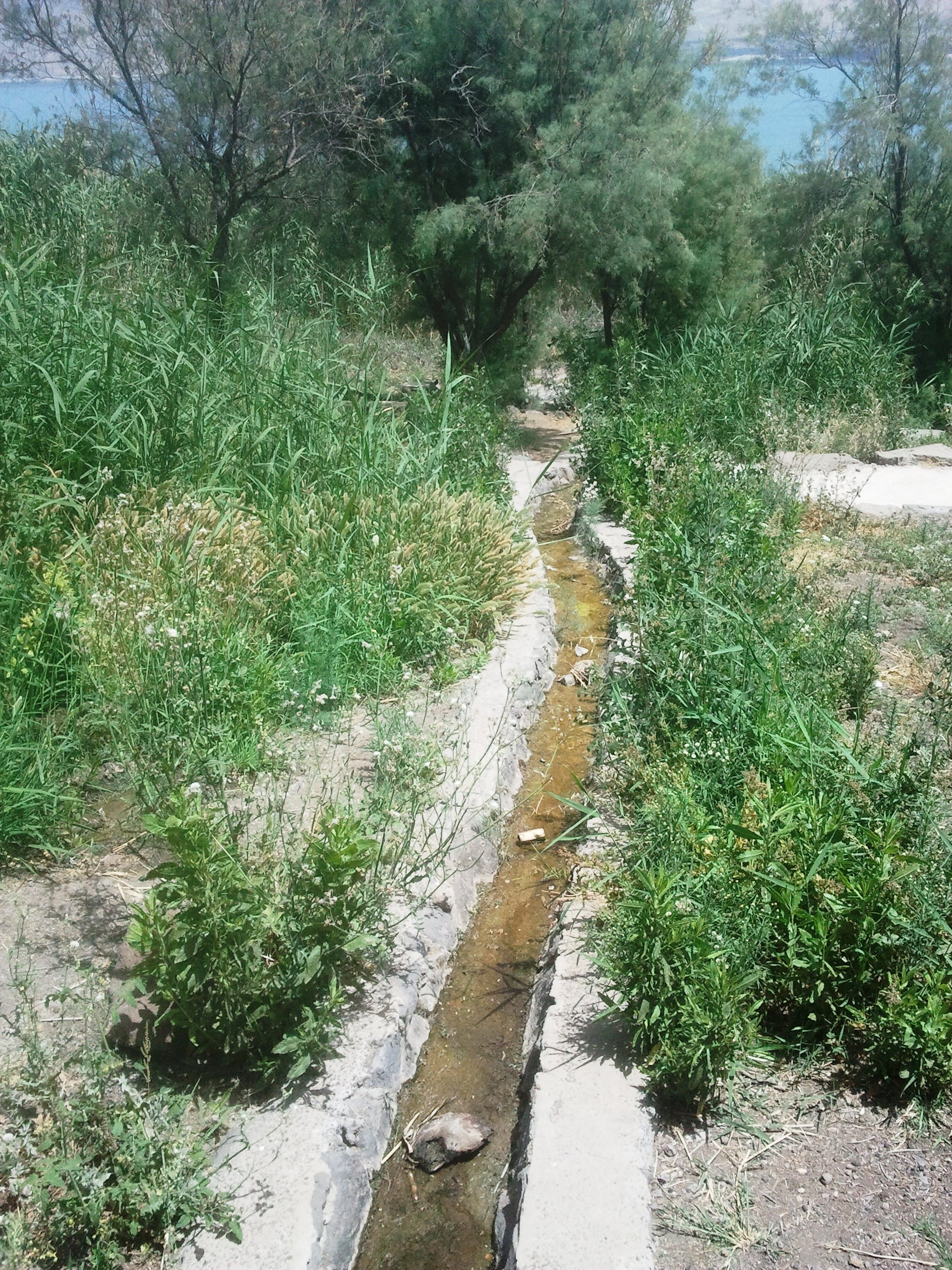
Small aqueduct

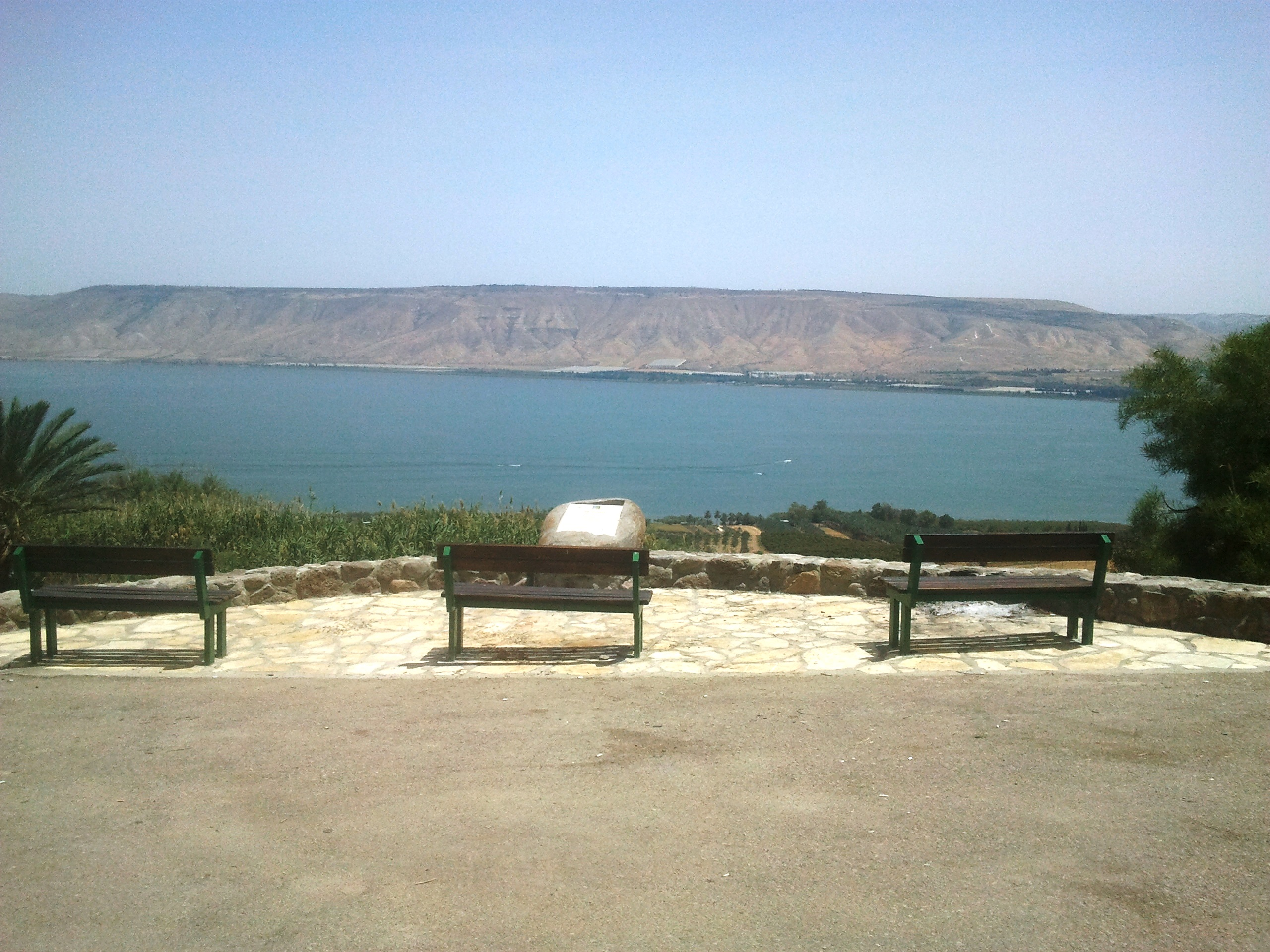
Naomi Shemer Lookout

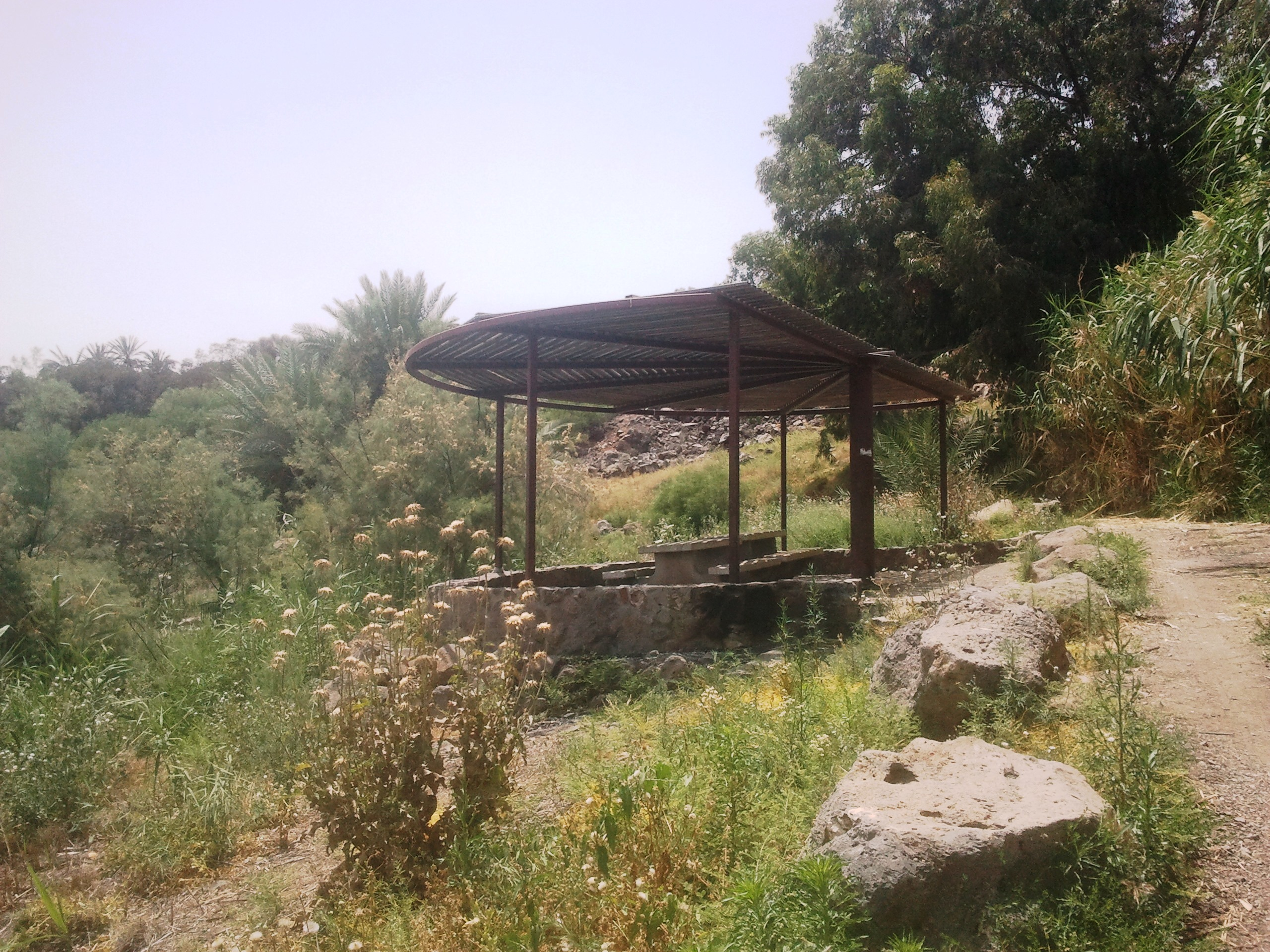
The northern lookout

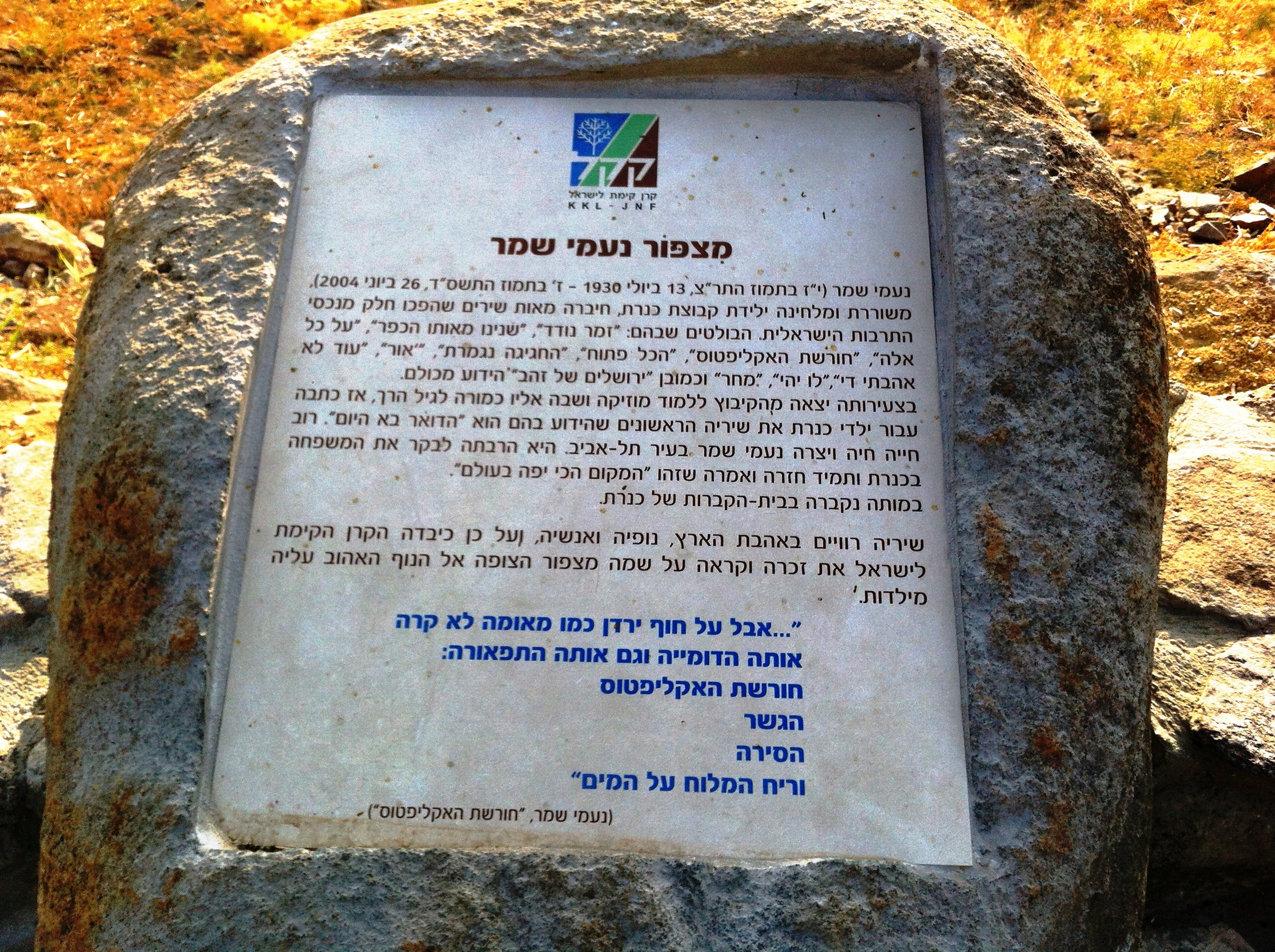
Naomi Shemer memorial plaque

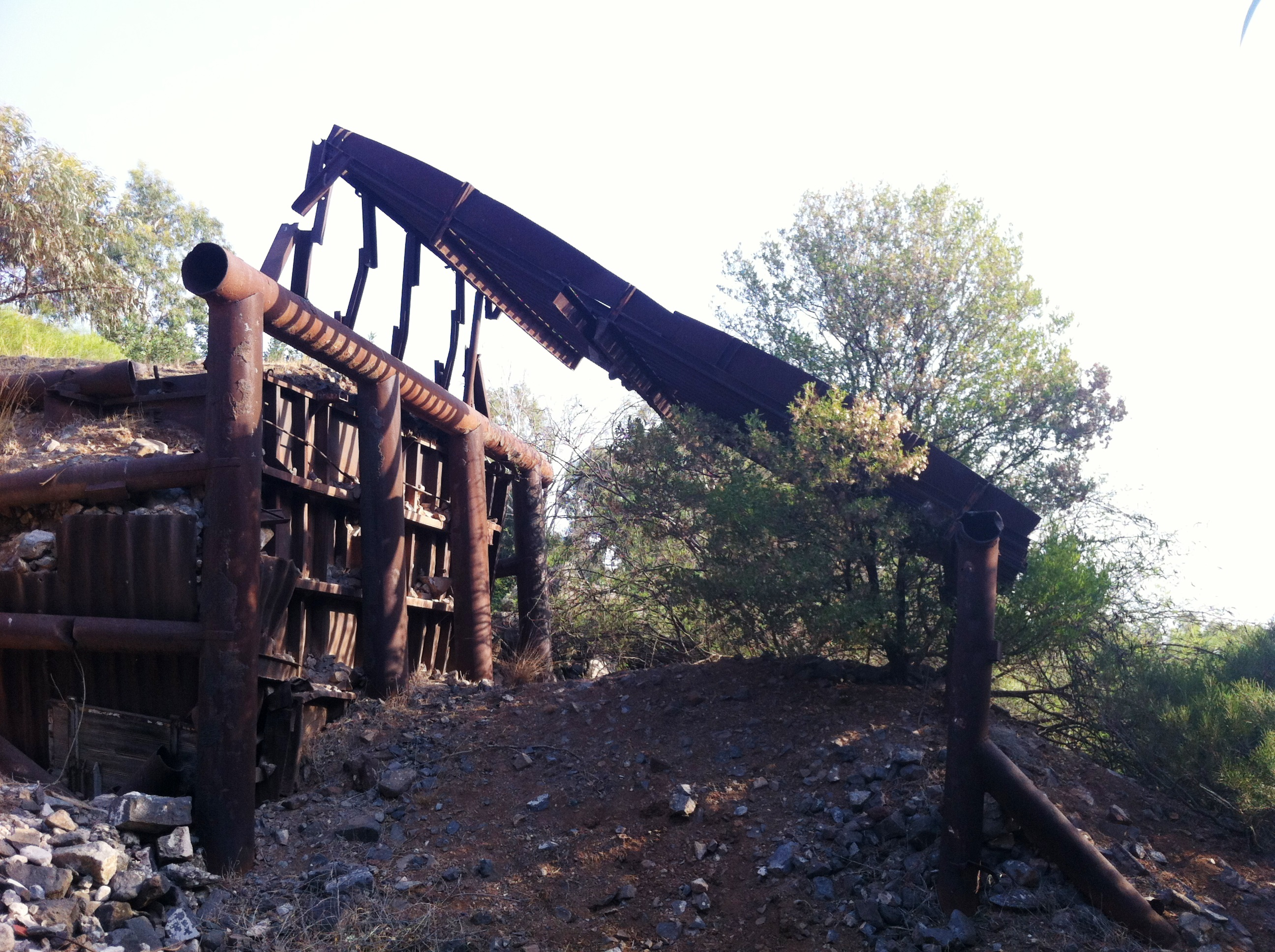
Quarry above Ein Poria
