= Mitzpe Oron =

- מצפה אורון
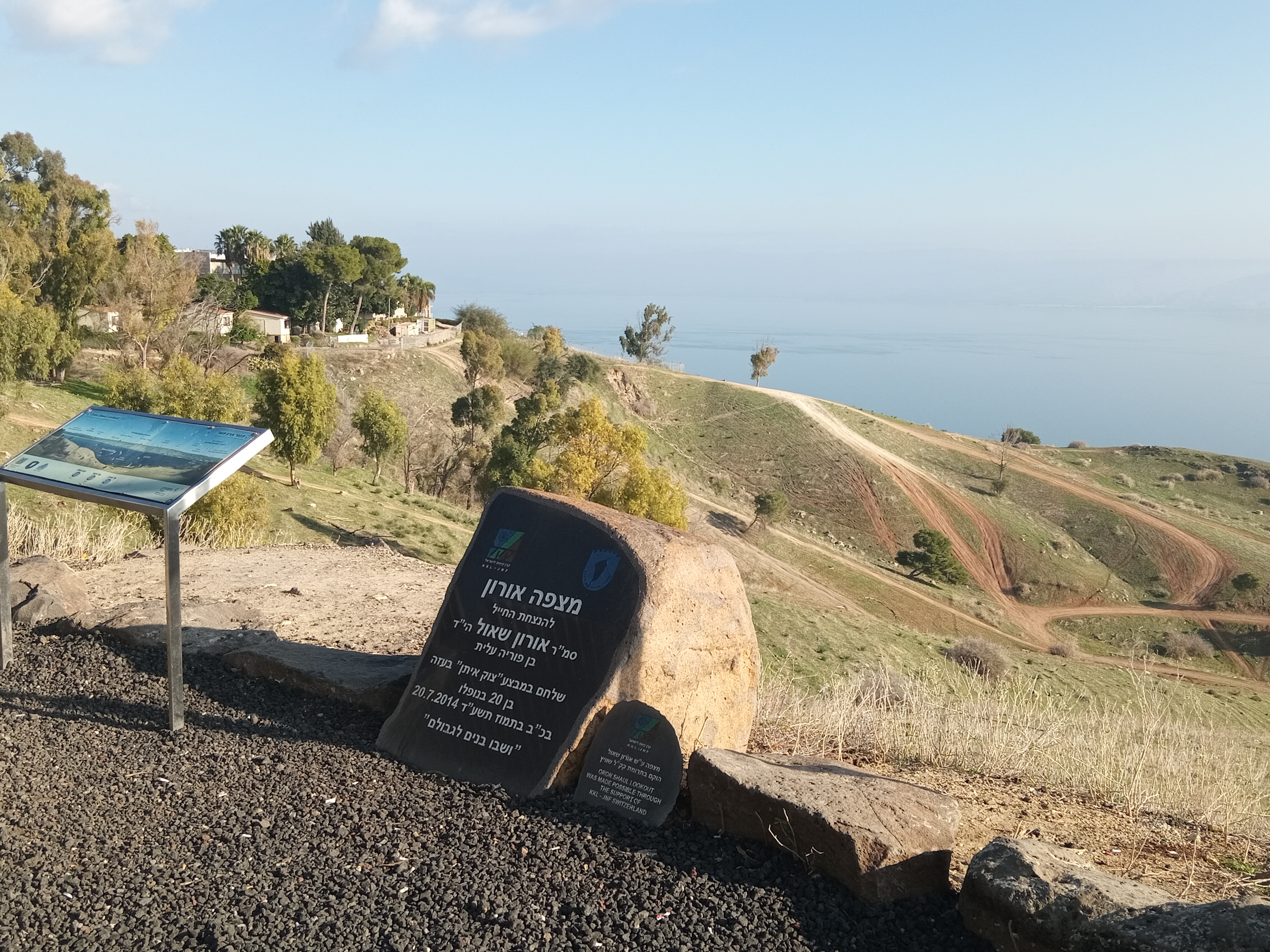

Mitzpe Oron (Hebrew:מצפה אורון, Oron Lookout) is a memorial site located in the Switzerland Forest in the Lower Galilee in Israel, inaugurated on Israel's Memorial Day in April 2015. The lookout was established in memory of First Sergeant Oron Shaul, an IDF soldier who was killed during the 2014 Gaza War. The lookout, situated opposite the Sea of Galilee, offers a panoramic view of the scenery, overlooking the Sea of Galilee and the Golan Heights. The site is characterized by a rectangular structure featuring a wide pergola supported by eight iron pillars. The floor is paved with concrete, and its front is adorned with a low wall covered in basalt stones. At the top of the lookout, the flags of Israel and the Jewish National Fund (JNF) are flown.

The lookout, established with the support of the JNF Friends in Switzerland, is located at a vantage point overlooking the Sea of Galilee, near the community of Poria Illit, where Oron Shaul lived. The site was built in the Switzerland Forest, which was originally planted as part of efforts to prevent flooding in the city of Tiberias.

First Sergeant Oron Shaul was killed in battle in the Shuja'iyya neighborhood of the Gaza Strip during Operation "Protective Edge" when the armored personnel carrier he was traveling in, along with seven other soldiers, was attacked by Hamas. Following the incident, Hamas claimed that Shaul had been captured and demanded the release of prisoners in exchange for the return of his body. The IDF declared Shaul as a fallen soldier whose place of burial was unknown.

On January 18, 2025, during the Gaza war, his body was recovered from the Gaza Strip in an operation carried out by the IDF and the Shin Bet, nearly a decade after he was killed.
