= Ravid =

Kibbutz in northern Israel

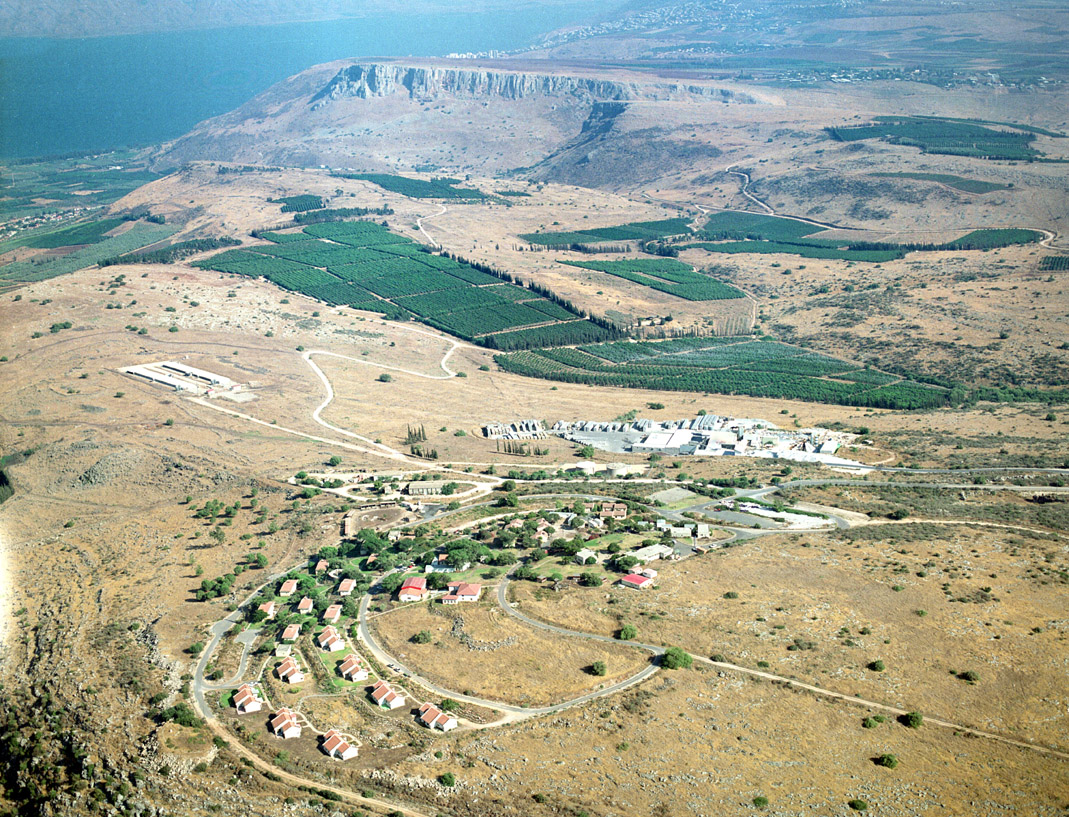
- Kibbutz Ravid and Mount Arbel

- Location within Northeast Israel
- Coordinates: 32°51′2″N 35°27′46″E
- Country: Israel
- District: Northern
- Subdistrict: Kinneret
- Council: Emek HaYarden
- Affiliation: Kibbutz Movement
- Founded: 1981
- Founder: Demobbed Nahal soldiers
- Population (2024): 178

Ravid (Hebrew: רָבִיד, lit. 'Necklace') is a small kibbutz in northern Israel. Located to the west of the Sea of Galilee, it falls under the jurisdiction of Emek HaYarden Regional Council. In 2024 it had a population of 178.

== History ==
Ravid is adjacent to an archaeological site which has been identified as Kfar Mimlah, home to the Hezir priestly family, which was exiled from Judea after the Bar Kokhba revolt.

Ravid was established in 1981 by members of the Takam movement as part of the Galilee lookouts programme, including 10 families who had moved from cities.

However, after a social crisis, the kibbutz was dismantled. It was successfully re-established in 1994 by former members of HaNoar HaOved VeHaLomed, and is now part of the Dror-Israel movement.
