= Scots Hotel =

Hotel in Tiberias, Israel

Coordinates: 32.7890°N 35.5415°E

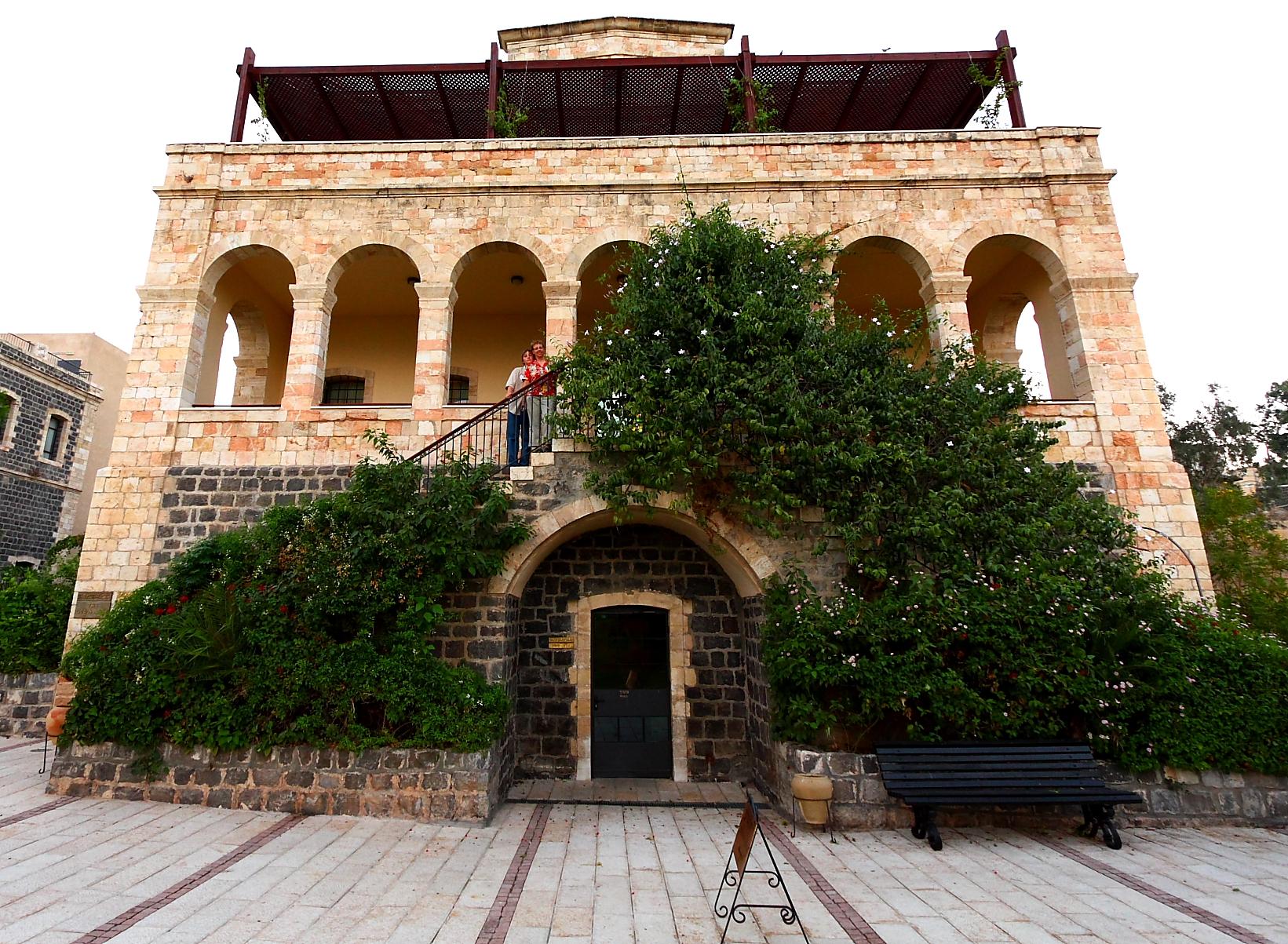
- Former names: Scots Mission Hospital

General information
- Location: Tiberias, Israel
- Opening: 1999
- Owner: Church of Scotland

Other information
- Number of rooms: 69
- Number of restaurants: 1

Website
- Scots Hotel

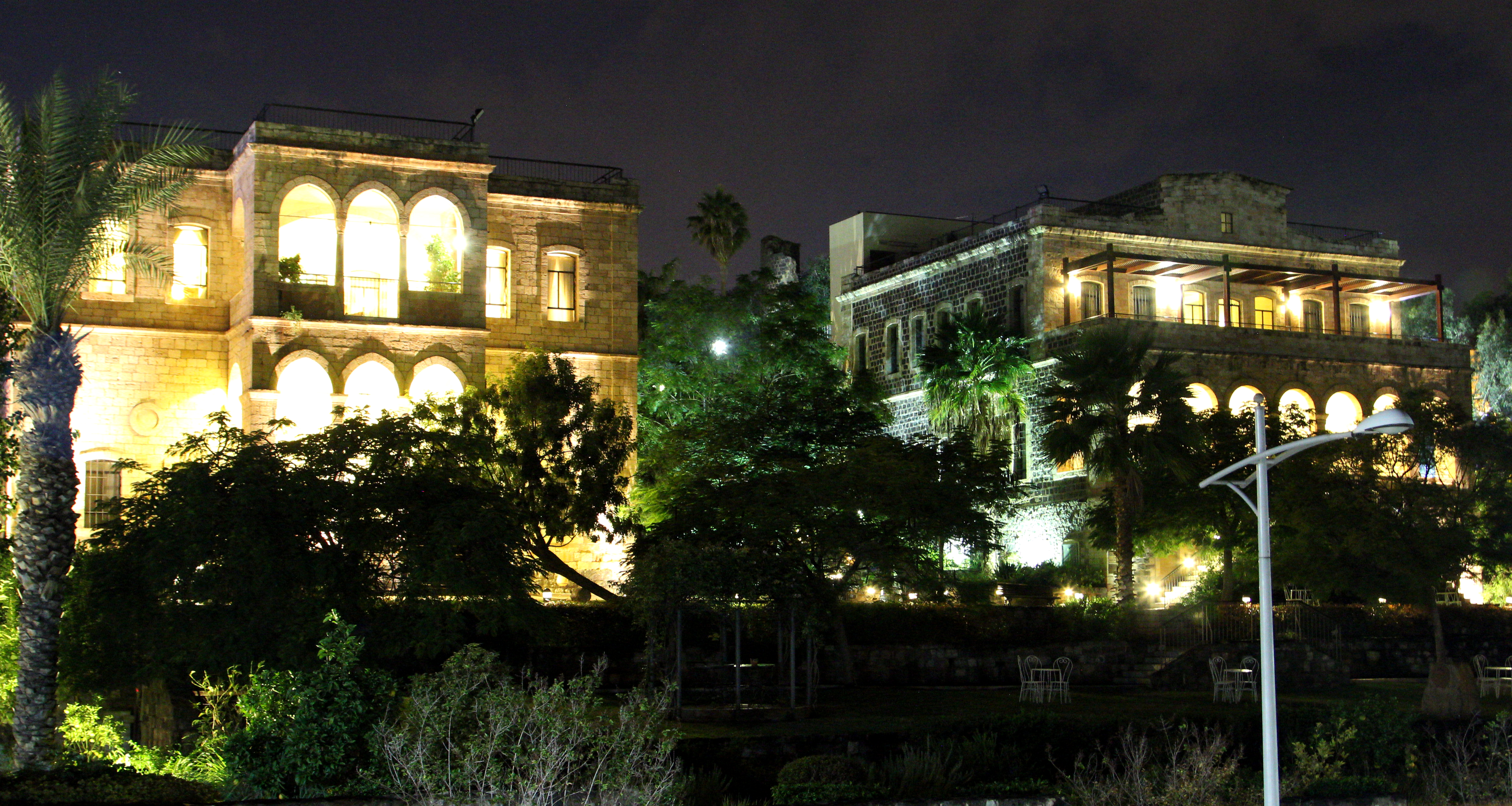
The Scots Hotel

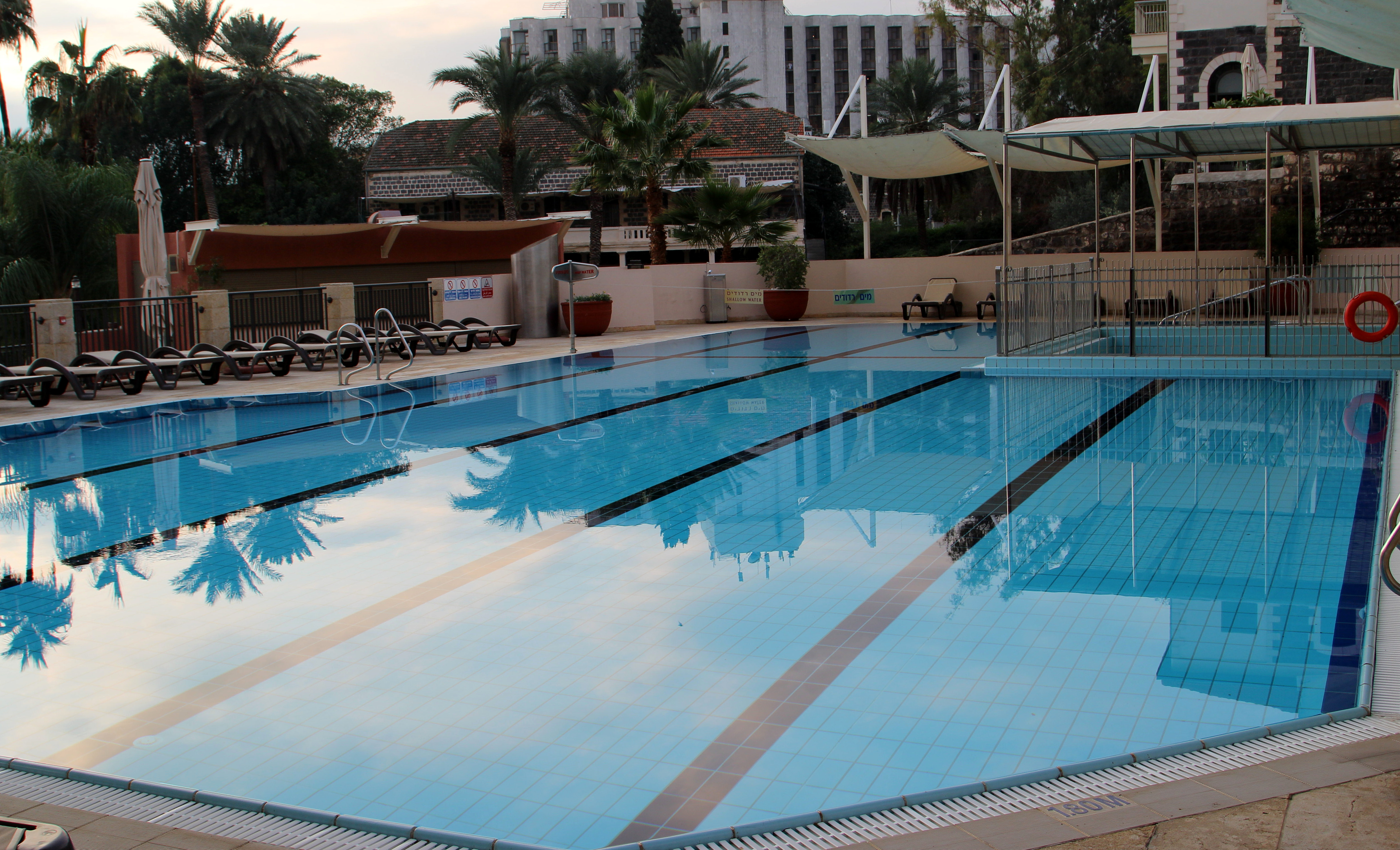
Swimming pool in the Scots Hotel

The Scots Hotel is a hotel in Tiberias, Israel, formerly the Scots Mission Hospital, also known as the Scottish Compound. The hotel is run by the Church of Scotland.

== History ==
=== Scottish missionary hospital (1885-1949) ===
The (United) Free Church of Scotland (1843-1929), a breakaway faction of the Church of Scotland, has established a mission hospital in Tiberias in 1885, as part of its Scottish mission to the Jews in Palestine. The mission's work was initiated and overseen by the Church's own General Assembly's Jewish Mission Committee. It acted separately from the London Society for Promoting Christianity Among the Jews, another British Protestant mission, even though respecting a degree of coordination, with the goal of increasing the common overall Protestant missionary achievements among Jews. The majority of the (United) Free Church of Scotland has merged back into the Church of Scotland in 1929.

Scottish doctor David Watt Torrance graduated his medical studies in Glasgow in 1883, and he travelled to Ottoman Palestine on behalf of the Jewish Mission Committee of the United Free Church of Scotland. According to the University of Dundee archives, he assisted there in the inauguration of the Sea of Galilee Medical Mission. Back in Tiberias after undertaking further training in Egypt, Damascus and Nazareth, he opened a two-room hospital near the Franciscan monastery, offering services to patients of all religions. A different source dates his first travel to 1884, and the first hospital being opened in September 1885, in a house rented for this purpose from the city's chief rabbi. In 1894, the hospital moved to the current, larger premises at Beit abu Shamnel abu Hannah, which initially had 24 beds and 6 cots for patients. The following year, Dr Torrance was ordained in the Free Church of Scotland. During World War I, he served in Scotland being in charge of a war hospital, but then returned to Tiberias where he died in 1923. That same year his son, Dr Herbert Watt Torrance, also a graduate of Glasgow University, was appointed head of the hospital. His work was recognised with an OBE "for medical services in Palestine" in the 1945 Birthday Honours.

=== Maternity hospital (1949-59) ===
In 1949, following the establishment of the State of Israel, the Scottish Hospital became a maternity hospital in charge of midwifery and gynaecology in Northern Galilee under the supervision of the Israeli Department of Health. Herbert Watt Torrance retired in 1953 and returned to Scotland. The hospital closed in 1959.

=== Pilgrims guesthouse and hostel (1959-99) ===
After 1959, the building became a hostel for pilgrims and then a guesthouse, known as the Scottish Hospice. The Church of Scotland maintained there a resident minister and bookshop in continuation of its missionary work.

=== 5-star hotel (est. 2004) ===
In 1999, the buildings were renovated at the cost of around £10,000,000 and reopened in 2004 as the luxurious Scots Hotel, which received the Israeli "Boutique Hotel of the Year" award in 2008.

== See also ==
- Poriya Hospital, who took over the maternity clinic
- St Andrew's Church, Jerusalem, aka Scots Memorial Church (1930)
