= St Andrew's Church, Jerusalem =

Scottish church in Jerusalem

Coordinates: 31°46′7.76″N 35°13′31.35″E

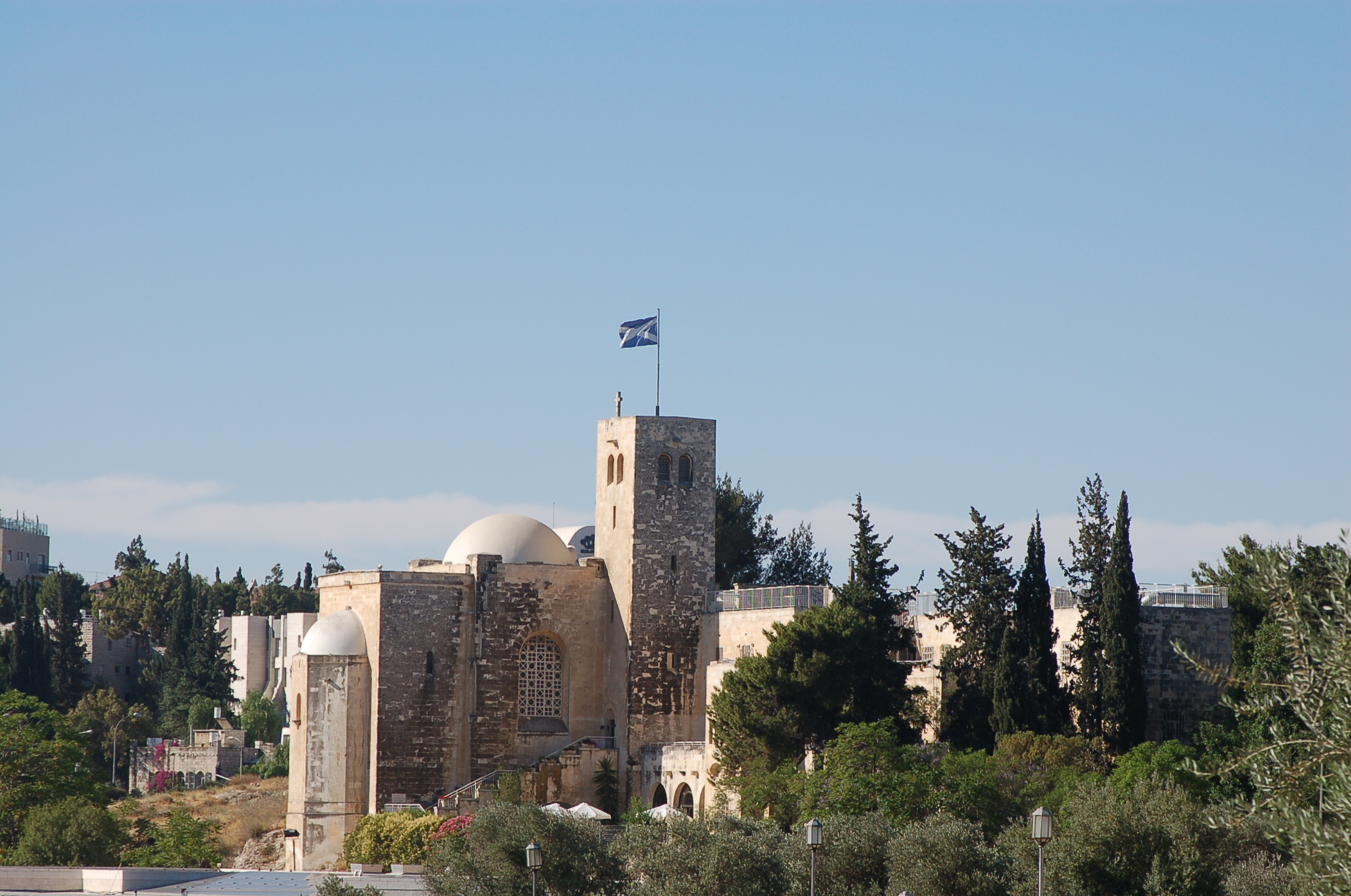
St Andrew's Church, Jerusalem

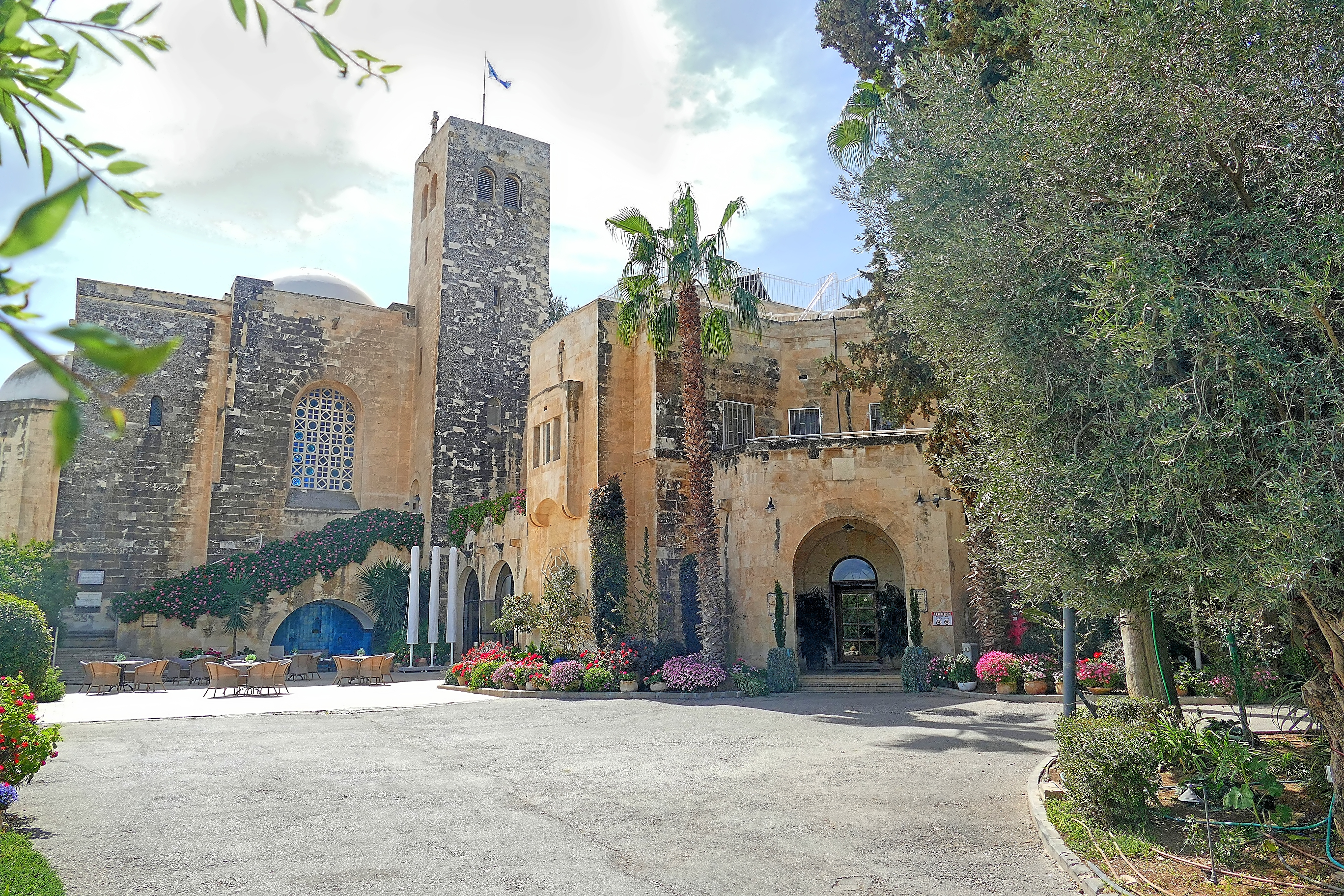
Entrance of the church

St Andrew's Church, also known as the Scots Memorial Church, is a church in Jerusalem, built as a memorial to the Scottish soldiers who were killed fighting the Turkish Army during the Sinai and Palestine campaign of the First World War, bringing to an end Ottoman rule over Palestine. It is a congregation presbyterian of the Church of Scotland.

== History ==
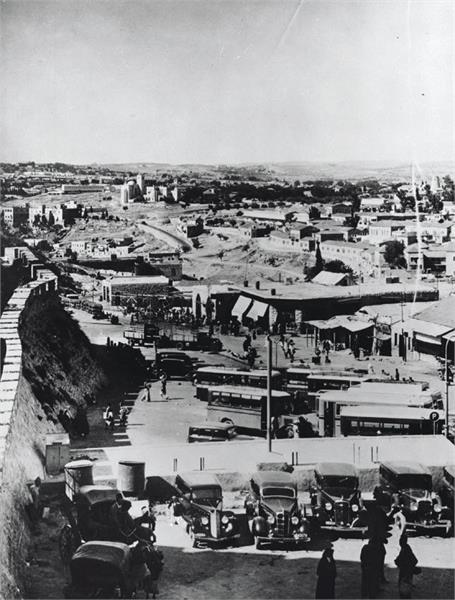
View of St Andrew’s from Jaffa Gate, 1925

=== British Mandate period ===
One of the main campaigners for the memorial church was Ninian Hill, an Edinburgh shipowner and Church elder. The foundation stone was laid by Field Marshal Lord Allenby on 7 May 1927 and the church was opened in 1930 with Ninian Hill as its first minister.

The Church was much used by Scots serving in the Mandate administration and soldiers serving with Scottish Regiments stationed in Palestine during the Mandate, including the Second World War.

=== Wars: 1947–1948, 1967 ===
After the outbreak of hostilities in 1948, the church was on the front line. The fighting firstly took place between Jewish forces in West Jerusalem and Arab irregulars in the Old City, later between the Jordanian Arab Legion soldiers and the Israeli army. The church holds a prominent location near what became the front line. The minister, William Clark Kerr, remained in the Church throughout this period, ringing the church bell and conducting Sunday services. In one cable to Edinburgh he wrote: "All night battle round the building... St Andrew's Cross (flag) on both church and manse. If that is not enough will try Rampant Lion."

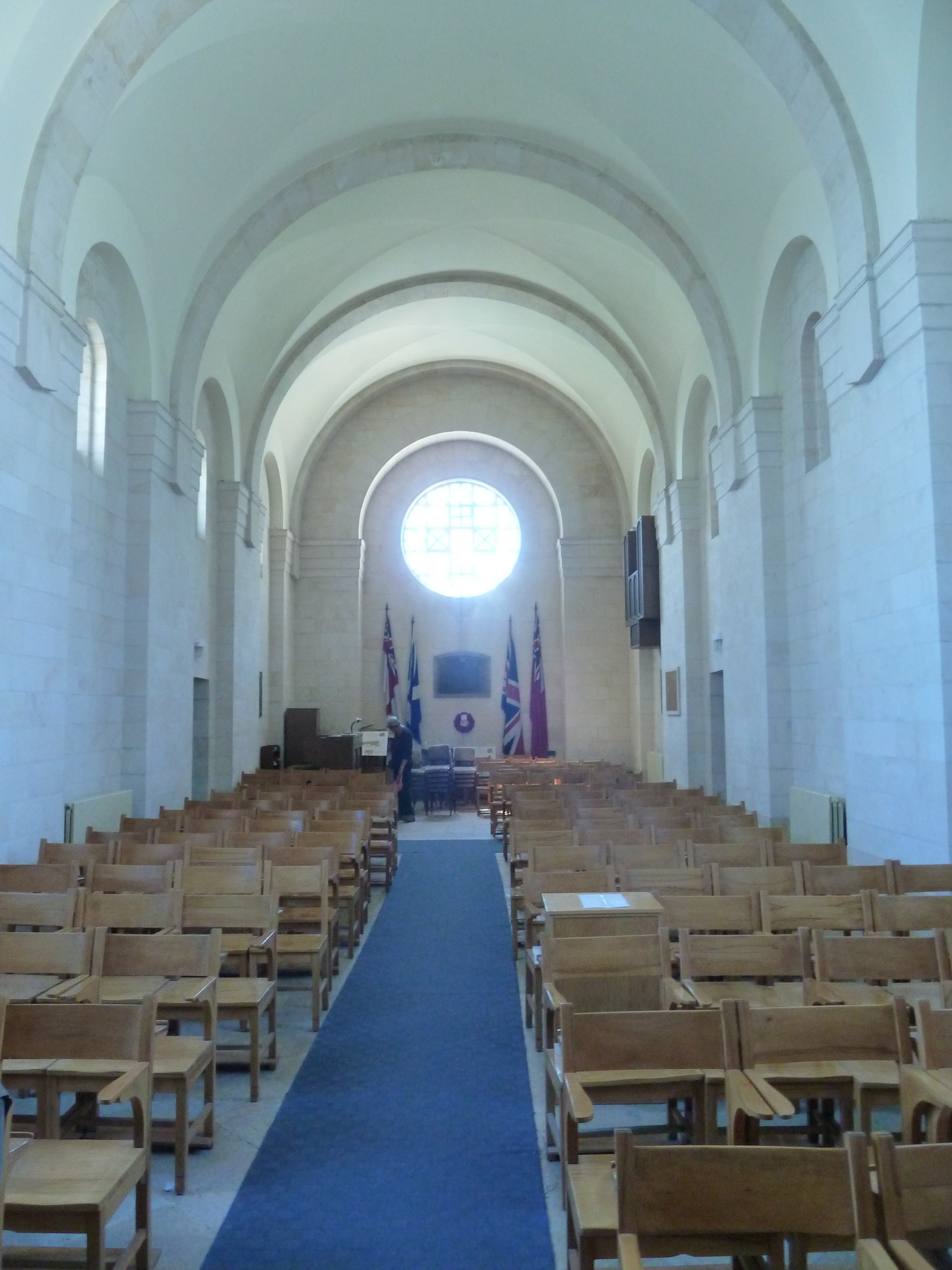
Interior, St Andrew's Church

The building still bears marks from fighting during the Six-Day War of 1967.

== Scottish missions and presence ==
The first Scottish missions to the Galilee started in the mid 19th century, and for the next 100 years Scottish Presbyterians were actively engaged in the fields of education and medicine. Psalm 122 is sung every May at the General Assembly of the Church of Scotland held in Edinburgh:

"Pray that Jerusalem may have
peace and felicity:
let them that love you and your peace
still have prosperity."
(first verse of Hymn 82 in the Church of Scotland hymnary, fourth edition)

Following the Second World War, the British Mandate for Palestine lasted until 1948. This substantially increased the number of Scots living and working in Jerusalem. Following the end of the mandate and the establishment of the State of Israel, the number of Scots working in Jerusalem dropped drastically. The church's location very near the 'Green Line' politically dividing Jerusalem, cut it off from the Christian community in the Old City.

== Present ==
The current Minister As of 2022 is Rev. Dr Stewart Gillan.

The church is open for services on Sundays and runs a hotel/guesthouse.

== Building ==
The church was designed in 1927 by the British architect Clifford Holliday, who headed his own private practice in the city. Its clean, plain silhouette stands across the Hinnom Valley from the Old City walls, and together with the wing housing the hospice evokes the outline of a Highland castle with a keep. The building contains Western as well as Eastern elements, with details reminding of Crusader-style architecture, but also with Armenian decorative tiles. The stained glass windows are built with blue Hebron glass set in stucco panels, in typical Art-Deco geometric fashion and combining the Latin with the x-shaped Scottish Saint Andrew's cross.

A plaque set in the floor in front of the communion table is dedicated to King Robert Bruce, whose dying wish was to have his heart buried in Jerusalem. His comrade-in-arms, Sir James Douglas, attempted to bring it to the Holy Land but fell in battle while on his way through Spain. Bruce's heart and Douglas' remains were returned to Scotland.

== Facilities outside Jerusalem ==
The Church of Scotland also runs the Tabeetha School, an English-language school at Jaffa that accepts Christian, Jewish and Muslim children (see homepage at External links).

Another facility is the refurbished Scots Hotel at Tiberias (see homepage at External links). The Church of Scotland centre there has a long tradition, the hotel being housed in what used to be known as the Scottish, or Dr Torrance's, hospital.

== See also ==
- List of Church of Scotland parishes
- Scots Hotel
- Christianity in Israel
