= Poria Illit =

Poria Illit: פּוֹרִיָּה עִלִּית (Hebrew)
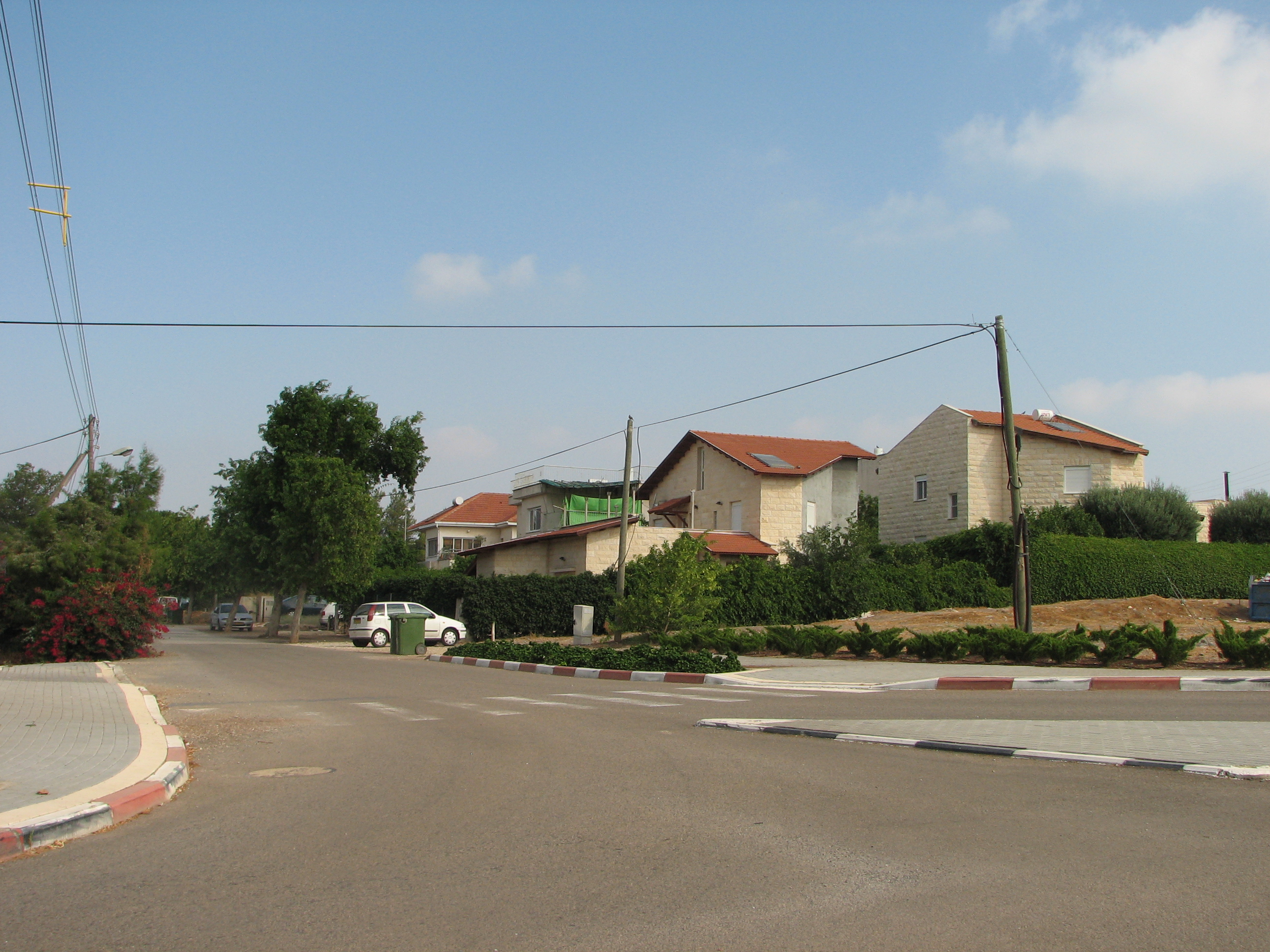
- Etymology: Upper Poria
- Location within Northeast Israel Location within Israel
- Coordinates: 32°44′11″N 35°32′37″E
- Country: Israel
- District: Northern
- Subdistrict: Kinneret
- Council: Emek HaYarden
- Founded: 1912 (original); 1940 (first re-establishment); 1955 (second re-establishment)
- Population (2024): 1,441

Poria Illit or Poriya Illit (Hebrew: פּוֹרִיָּה עִלִּית, lit. "Upper Poriya") is a community settlement in northern Israel. Located near the southwestern shore of the Sea of Galilee, it falls under the jurisdiction of Emek HaYarden Regional Council. In 2024 it had a population of 1,441.

== Etymology ==
Poria or poriya, pronounced poriyA (with stress on a), is the transliteration of פוריה, the singular feminine form of the Hebrew word for 'fertile' or 'productive'.

== History ==
Poria was first settled in 1912 and operated as a farm run by Jewish immigrants from the Second Aliyah. However, the original residents left after the outbreak of World War I, and the land was abandoned until 1940.

That year a group of settlers (kvutza) affiliated with the socialist-Zionist Noar HaOved (Working Youth) movement, Alumot, settled in the area. They renovated the original basalt stone houses, naming the village Poria Alumot. In 1947 they were given a permanent site for their kibbutz at Bitania Illit, on a hill opposite Poria. The new kibbutz was named Alumot.

Another kibbutz founded in its place was dissolved in 1949 and most of the residents moved to Alumot. Poria Illit was established in 1955. In 1991 it was officially recognized as distinct from Poria – Neve Oved.

According to the Company for Location and Restitution of Holocaust Victims' Assets, there are 65 plots in Poria that were purchased by Jews who were later murdered in the Holocaust.

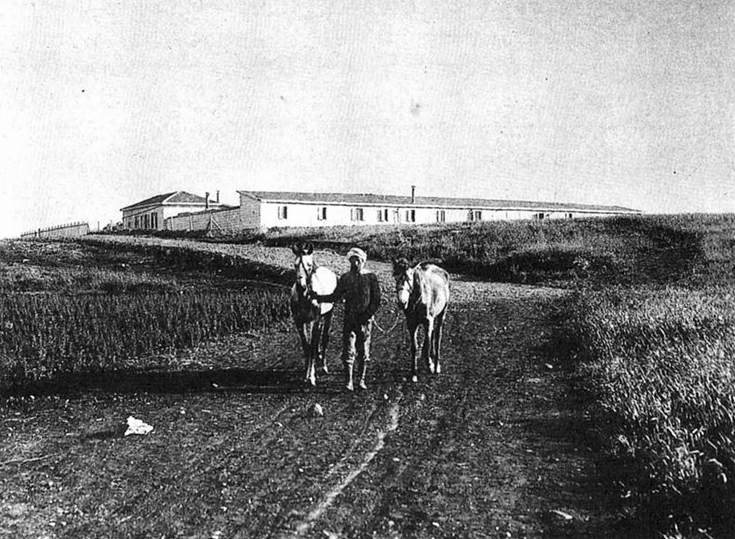
Poria farm, 1912

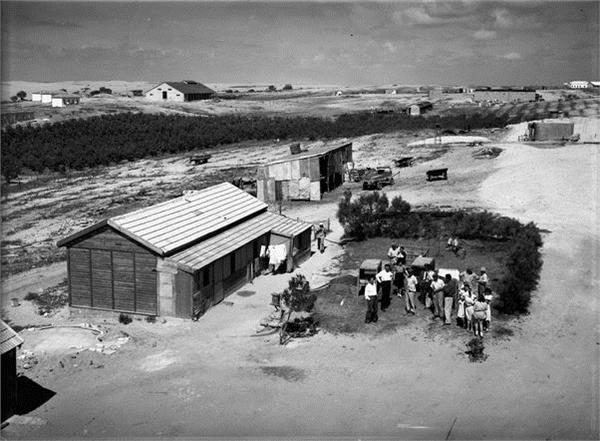
Poria 1940

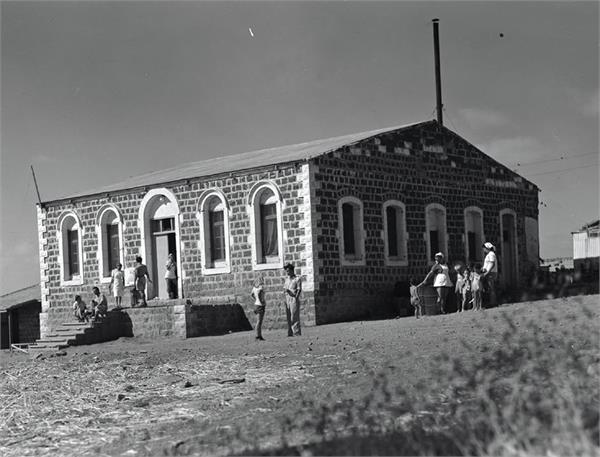
Poria 1946

== Landmarks ==
Nearby is Ein Poria, a natural water spring overlooking the Sea of Galilee that has been developed by the KKL as a local recreation site.

== Health care ==
The nearby Poriya Medical Center was founded in 1955, replacing the Schweitzer Memorial Hospital from Tiberias. The center incorporates a maternity hospital owned by the Scottish Church, previously also located in Tiberias. In 2005, the center was renamed for Prof. Baruch Padeh, former director-general of the Ministry of Health, who headed the hospital in 1974–1976. Located on Poriya Ridge above Tiberias, it serves the population of Tiberias, Golan Heights, Jordan Valley, Lower Galilee, among them many kibbutzim and moshavim. In 2022 it was again rebranded as the Tzafon Medical Center (Northern Medical Center).

== Notable people ==
- Oron Shaul, soldier killed in Gaza and ransomed by Hamas
