= Alumot =

Alumot: אֲלֻמּוֹת, אלומות (Hebrew)
- Kibbutz

Hebrew transcription(s)
  - Official: Alummot
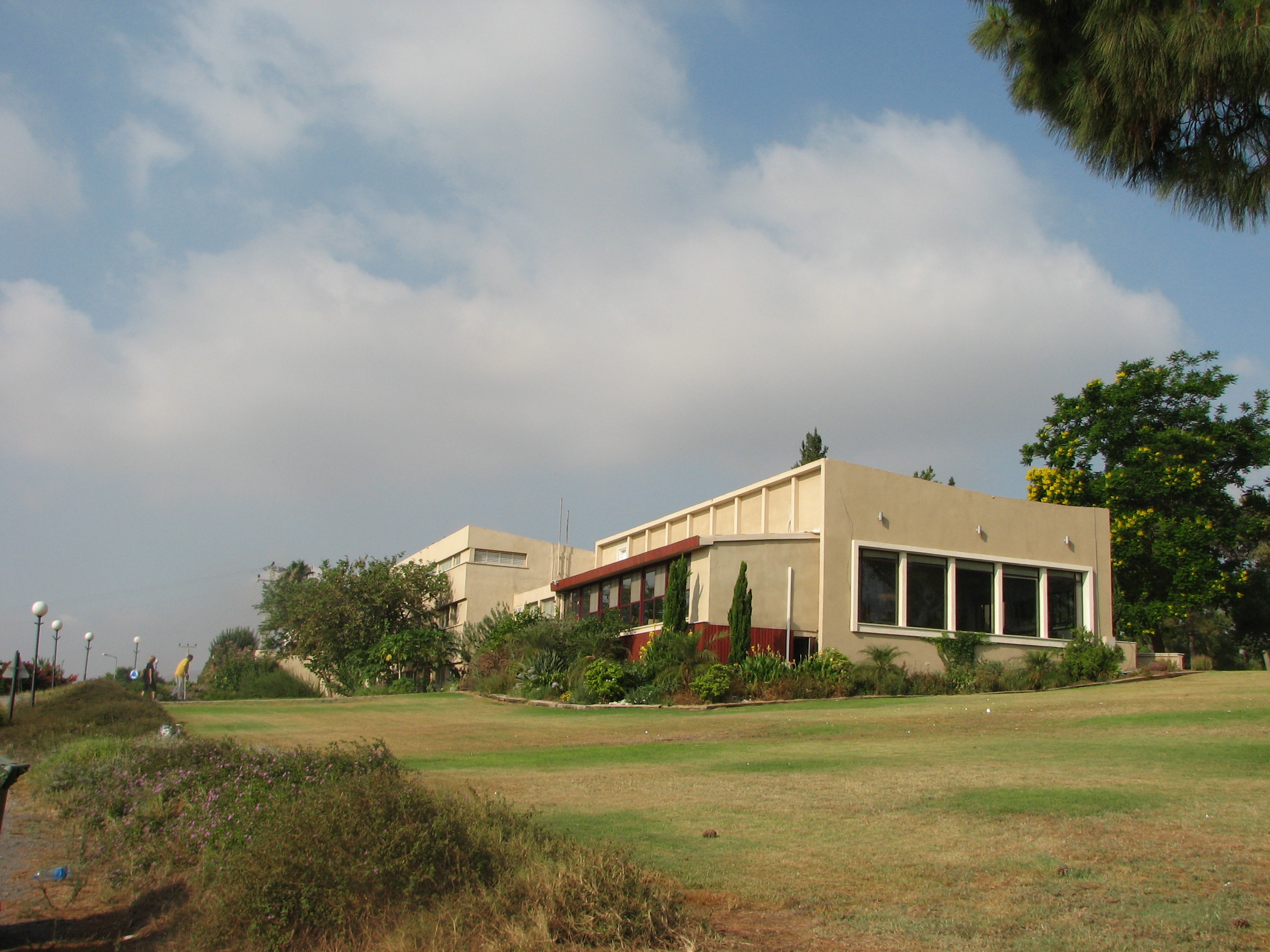
- Etymology: 'Sheaves'
- Location within Northeast Israel Location within Israel
- Coordinates: 32°42′24″N 35°32′46″E
- Country: Israel
- District: Northern
- Subdistrict: Kinneret
- Council: Emek HaYarden
- Affiliation: Kibbutz Movement
- Founded: 1947
- Founder: Ben Shemen Agricultural School graduates
- Population (2024): 481

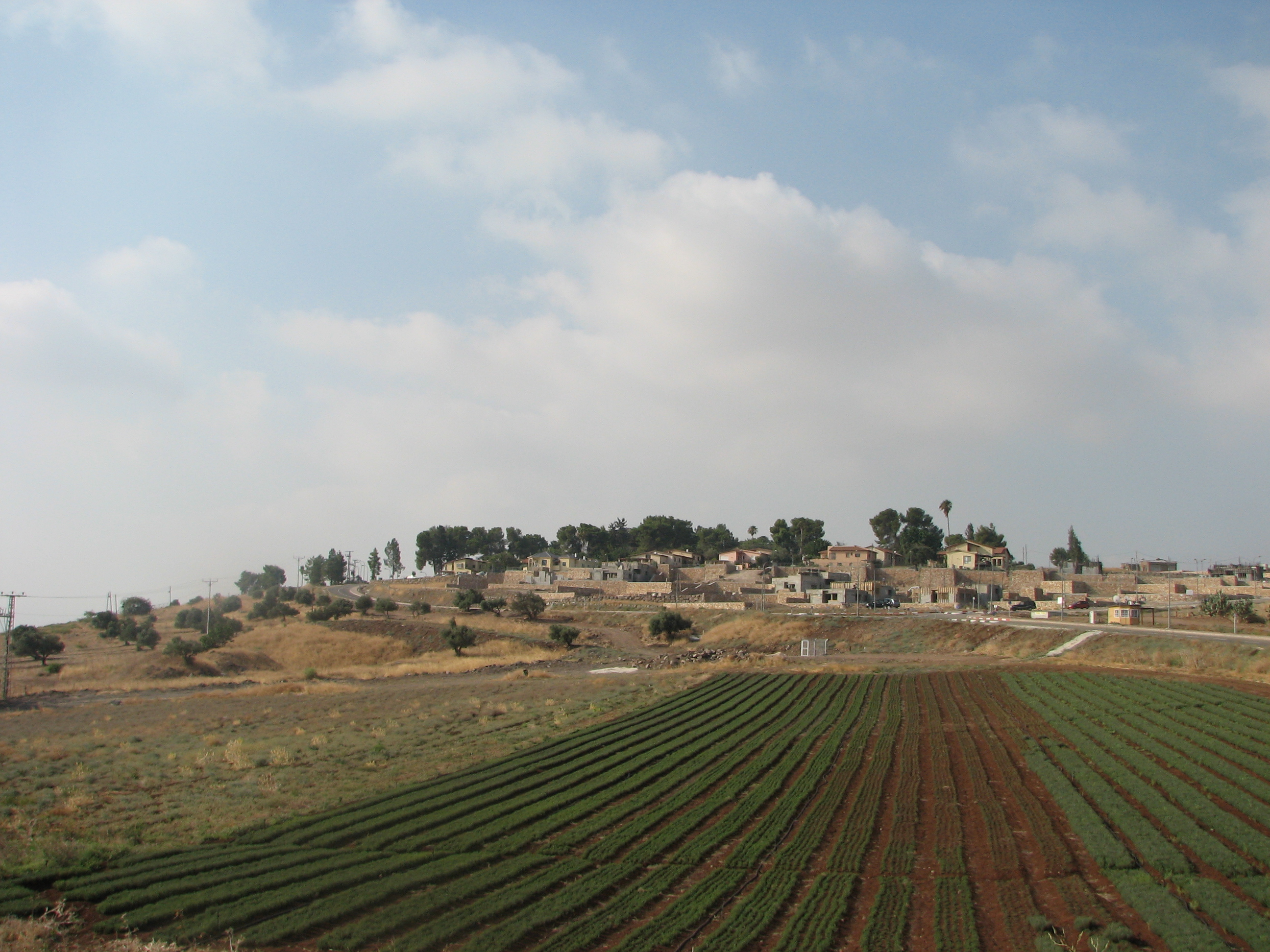
Alumot fields

Alumot (Hebrew: אֲלֻמּוֹת, lit. "Sheaves") is a kibbutz in northern Israel. Located to the south of the Sea of Galilee, it falls under the jurisdiction of Emek HaYarden Regional Council. In 2024 it had a population of 481.

== History ==
Kibbutz Alumot was formed in 1936 by a kvutza of graduates of the Ben Shemen Agricultural School. In 1940, the group moved to a temporary site known as "Poria Alumot" (now Poria Illit). They earned a living from agriculture and a sanatorium, Beit Alumot. In 1947 they established a permanent settlement on a nearby hill overlooking the Sea of Galilee and the Jordan Valley. Due to a shortage of water, agricultural land and new members, the kibbutz was dismantled in 1969, but was re-established the following year by immigrants from Argentina.

In 2008, President Shimon Peres visited the kibbutz, which he helped to found, together with his children. Peres' daughter Tzvia (Tziki) Walden was born there. Before the establishment of the state, Peres worked on the kibbutz as a shepherd and a farmer.

== Economy ==
Alumot breeds livestock and also runs a guest house with beach facilities and a water park.

== Notable people ==
- Shimon Peres, Prime Minister and President
