= Poria – Kfar Avoda =

Poria – Kfar Avoda: פּוֹרִיָּה - כְּפָר עֲבוֹדָה (Hebrew)
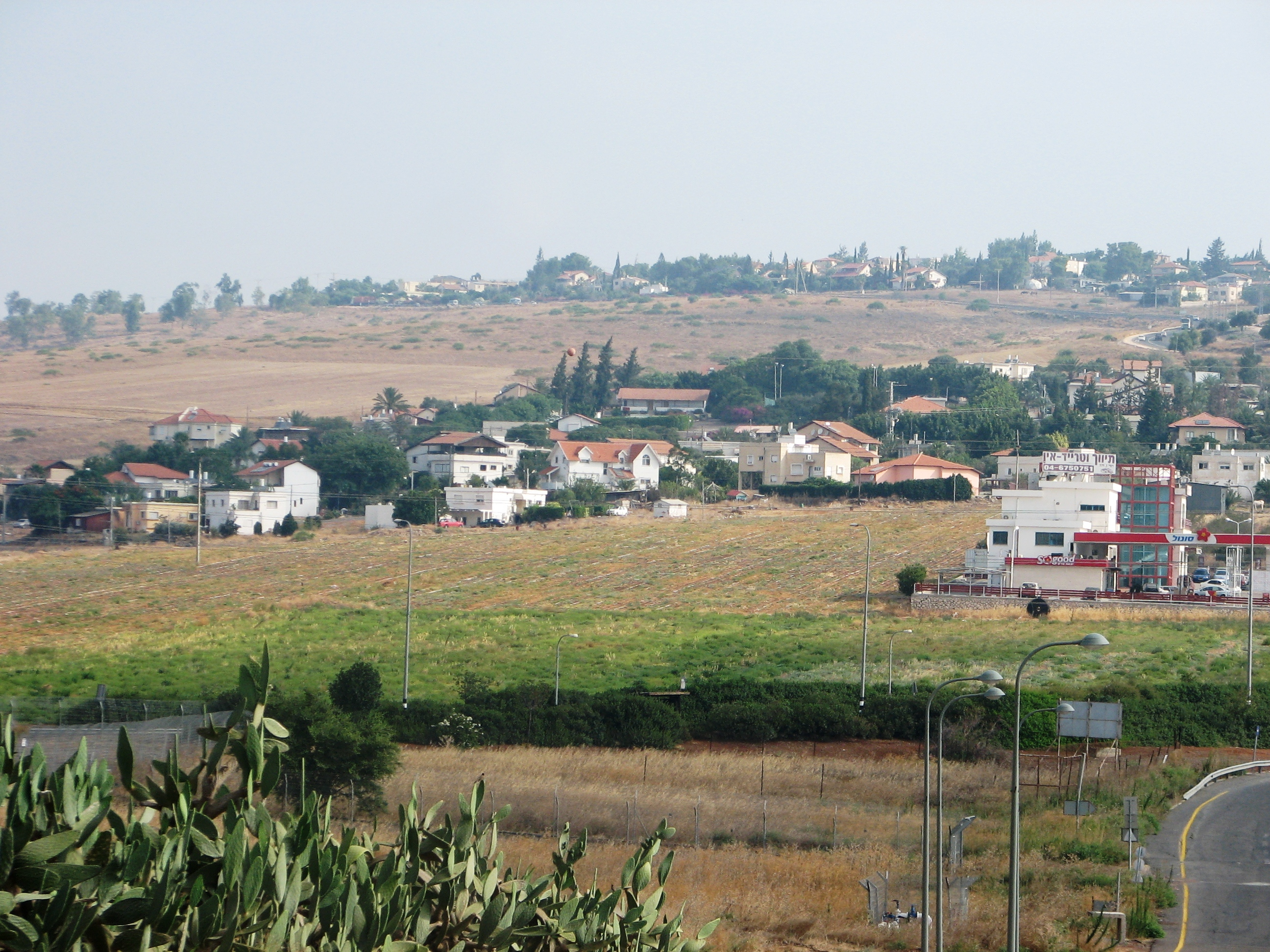
- Etymology: Poria - Labor Village
- Location within Northeast Israel Location within Israel
- Coordinates: 32°43′12″N 35°32′47″E
- Country: Israel
- District: Northern
- Subdistrict: Kinneret
- Council: Emek HaYarden
- Founded: 1949
- Founder: Yemenite immigrants
- Population (2024): 328

Poria – Kfar Avoda or Poriya – Kfar Avoda (Hebrew: פּוֹרִיָּה - כְּפָר עֲבוֹדָה, lit. "Poria - Village [of] Labour"), is a community settlement in northern Israel. Located on the Poriya Ridge to the south-west of the Sea of Galilee near Tiberias, it falls under the jurisdiction of Emek HaYarden Regional Council. In 2024 it had a population of 328.

== History ==
The village was founded in 1949 by some 90 families who had immigrated from Yemen, with the assistance of the Jewish Agency for Israel.
