= Emek HaYarden Regional Council =

Coordinates: 32°42′N 35°35′E

Emek HaYarden עמק הירדן
- Regional council (from 1949)
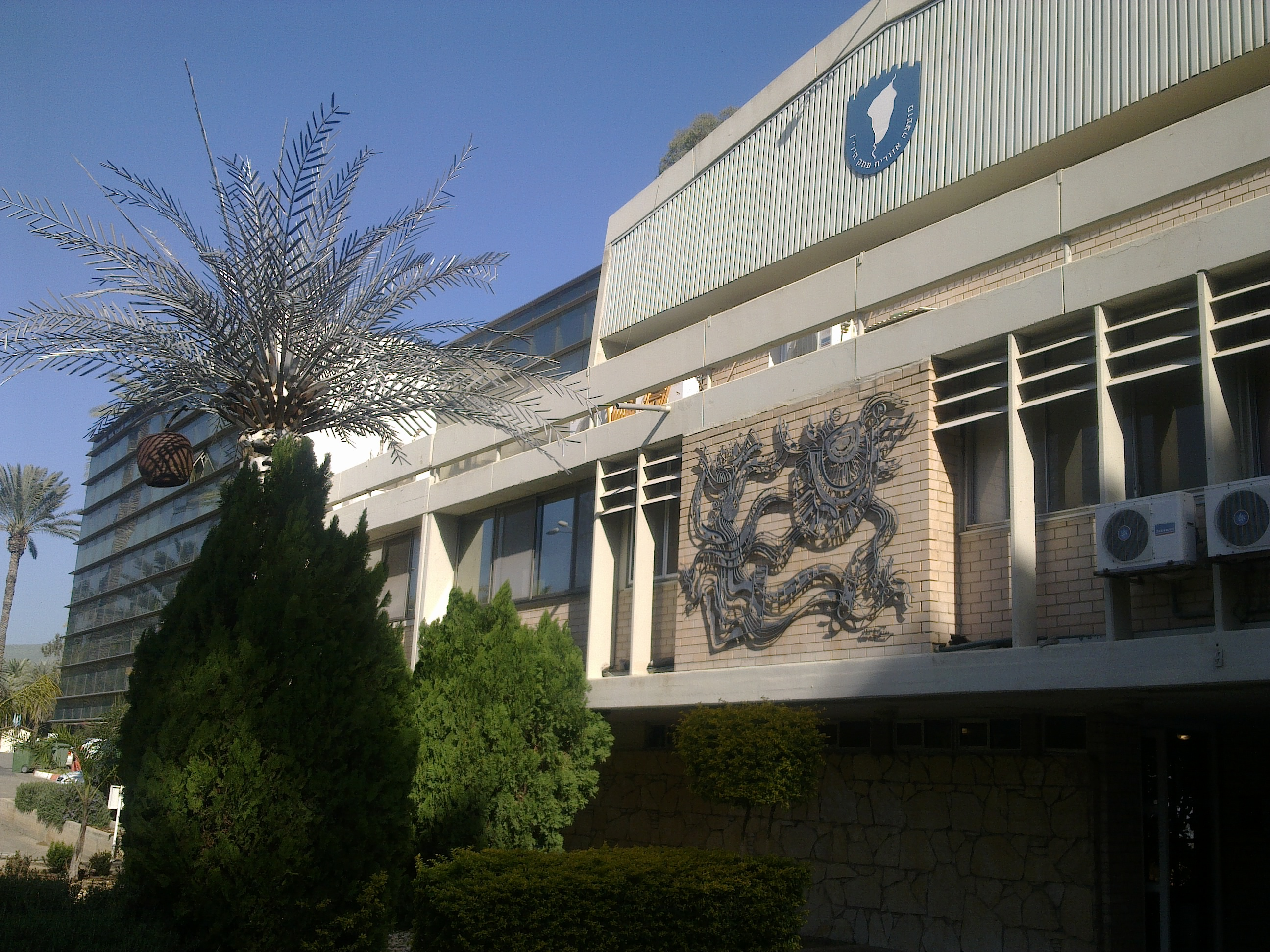
- Regional council administrative building
- Interactive map of Emek HaYarden
- Country: Israel
- District: Northern
- Subdistrict: Kinneret
- Natural region: Kinerot, Eastern Lower Galilee

Government
  - Head of Municipality: Idan Greenbaum

Area
  - Total: 183,870 dunams (183.87 km^{2}; 70.99 sq mi)

Population (2024)
  - Total: 16,341
  - Density: 88.873/km^{2} (230.18/sq mi)
- Website: Official website

Emek HaYarden Regional Council (Hebrew: מועצה אזורית עמק הירדן, Mo'atza Azorit 'Emeq HaYarden, lit. Jordan Valley Regional Council) is a regional council comprising much of the western shore of the Sea of Galilee, the southern parts of its eastern shore, and the northern part of the Jordan Valley all the way to Beit She'an in the south.

== History ==
Emek HaYarden Regional Council was the first regional council in Israel, established in 1949.

Most of the communities are of the kibbutz type and are located on Highway 90, a north–south road which traverses the council's territory parallel to the Jordan River and along the western shore of the Sea of Galilee. The offices of the council are located between Degania Alef and the Tzemah Industrial Zone.

== List of villages ==
This regional council provides various municipal services for the villages within its territory:

Community settlements
- HaOn, a former kibbutz
- Poria Illit
- Poria – Kfar Avoda
- Poria – Neve Oved

Kibbutz-type settlements

- Afikim
- Alumot
- Ashdot Ya'akov Meuhad
- Ashdot Ya'akov Ihud
- Beit Zera
- Degania Alef
- Degania Bet
- Ein Gev
- Gesher
- Ginosar
- Hokuk
- Kvutzat Kinneret
- Masada
- Ma'agan
- Ravid
- Sha'ar HaGolan
- Tel Katzir

Moshav-type settlement

- Almagor

Moshava-type settlement

- Moshavat Kinneret

== Demographics ==
Historical population
| Year | Pop. | ±% |
|---|---|---|
| 1972 | 6,600 | — |
| 1983 | 8,400 | +27.3% |
| 1995 | 8,800 | +4.8% |
| 2008 | 10,770 | +22.4% |
| 2022 | 15,256 | +41.7% |
| 2024 | 16,341 | +7.1% |

== Voting Patterns ==
In the 2022 election, 73 percent of voters in the regional council voted for the parties of the center-left coalition led by Yair Lapid, while 27 percent voted for the parties of the right-wing coalition led by Benjamin Netanyahu and 0.4 percent voted for the Arab parties.

In the 2026 election, 69 percent of voters in the regional council voted for the parties of the center-left coalition led by Gadi Eisenkot, while 24 percent voted for the parties of the right-wing coalition led by Benjamin Netanyahu and 0.7 percent voted for the Arab parties. An additional 3.6 percent voted for the Reservists, and 2.2 percent voted for Amcha Yisrael. Voter turnout increased 17 percent from the 2022 election.

== See also ==
Important sites in the area, in alphabetical order (ignoring articles).

- Capernaum, archaeological and Christian pilgrimage site
- Hamat Gader, ancient and modern hot springs spa
- Khirbet Minya, Umayyad qasr
- Kinneret (archaeological site) at Tel Kinrot/Tell el-Oreimeh
- Kinneret Cemetery (see Moshavat Kinneret#Cemetery)
- Kinneret Farm or Kinneret Courtyard, Zionist experimental training farm (est. 1908)
- Khirbet Kerak at Tel Bet Yerah, archaeological site
- Naharayim power plant
- Al-Sinnabra at Tel Bet Yerah, archaeological site
- Sussita/Hippos (Golan Heights), ancient city & archaeological site
- Tabgha, archaeological and Christian pilgrimage site
  - Church of the Multiplication
- Tzafon Medical Center (Poriya Hospital)
- Ubeidiya prehistoric site
