= Tzafon Medical Center =

Tsafon Medical Center, Poriya
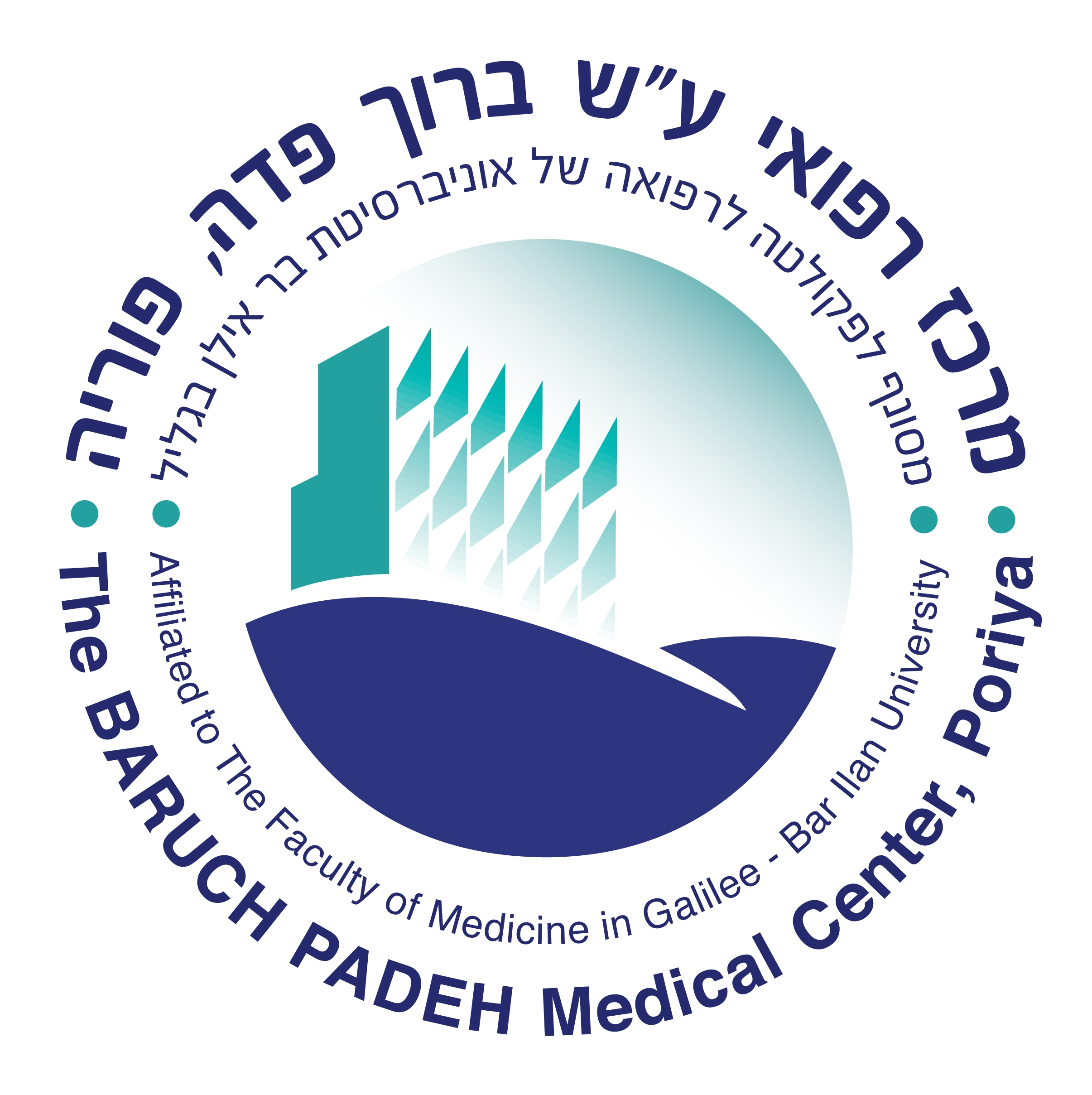

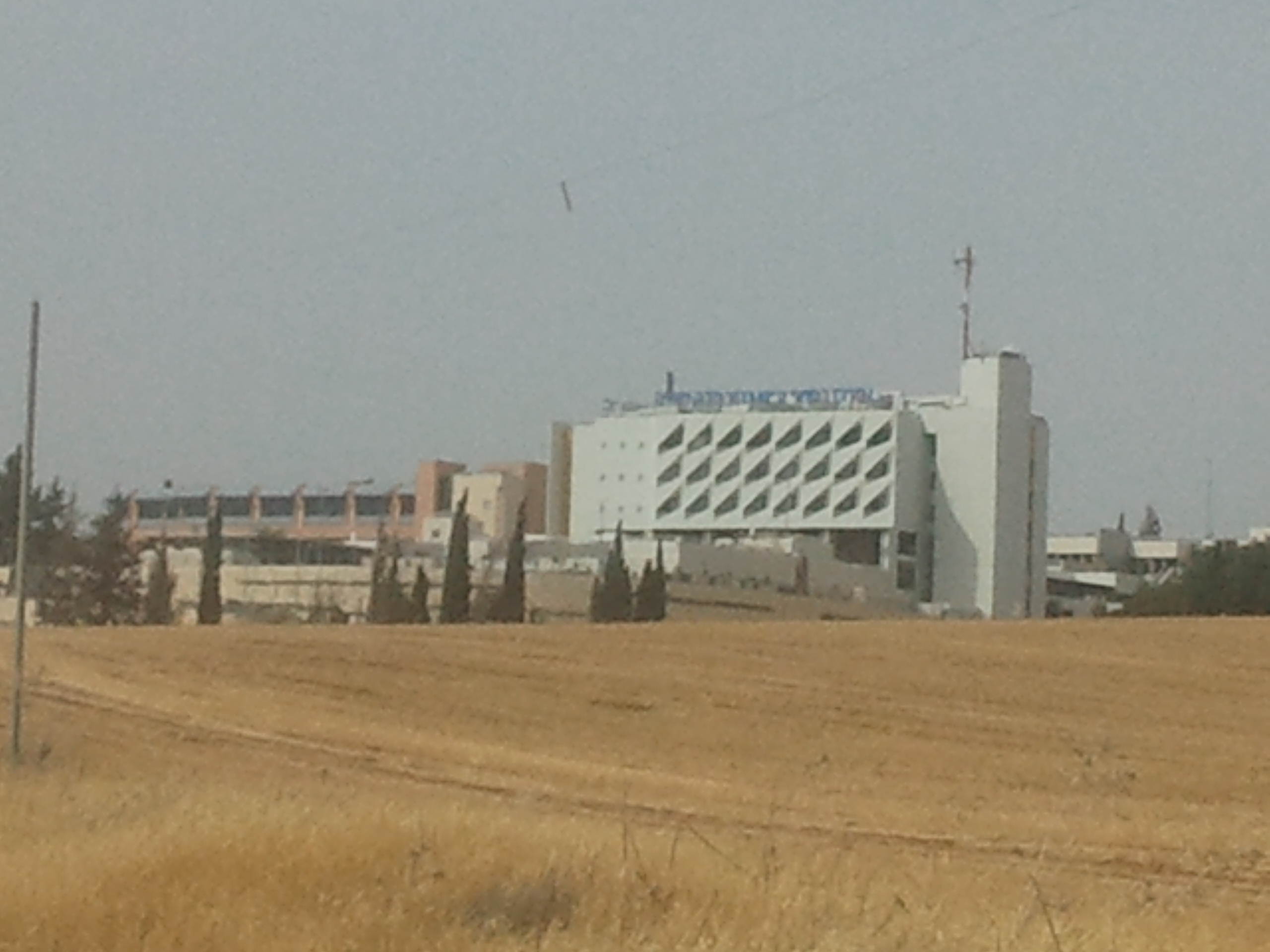
- The hospital in 2014, before the latest expansion

Geography
- Location: Tiberias, Israel
- Coordinates: 32.7523°N 35.5403°E

Organisation
- Care system: Public
- Type: District General

Services
- Beds: 318

History
- Founded: 1955

Links
- Website: http://www.poria.health.gov.il/

"Tzafon Medical Center named after Baruch Padeh" at Poriya, lit. Northern Medical Center, formerly simply Baruch Padeh Medical Center (Hebrew: בית חולים ברוך פדה, Beit Holim Barukh Padeh), generally known as Poriya Hospital, is a rural general hospital located just south of Tiberias, in the Galilee region of Israel. It is affiliated with the Safed-based Azrieli Medical Faculty of Bar Ilan University.

== History ==
Poriya Medical Center was founded in 1955, replacing the Schweitzer Memorial Hospital (1930-1931 and 1934-1955) and the Scots Mission Hospital, both from Tiberias. The center incorporates a maternity hospital owned by the Scottish Church that was previously located in Tiberias. In 2005, the center was renamed for Prof. Baruch Padeh, former director-general of the Ministry of Health, who headed the hospital in 1974–1976. Located on Poriya Ridge above Tiberias, it serves the population of Tiberias, Golan Heights, Jordan Valley, and Lower Galilee, including many kibbutzim and moshavim. In 2022, with its expansion and upgrading as a major hospital, it was branded as the "Tzafon Medical Center" ("Northern Medical Center").

== See also ==
- Health care in Israel
