= Swiss Forest (Israel) =

Forest area in Israel

Coordinates: 32.7706°N 35.5356°E

The Swiss Forest or Switzerland Forest is a forest area on the western side of the Sea of Galilee in Israel, situated above the city of Tiberias.

The forest was established in 1928 by the Forestry Branch of the Mandatory Palestine government thanks to a contribution from friends of Keren Kayemeth LeIsrael-Jewish National Fund in Switzerland, which is how it got its name. The forest was established to prevent flooding such as in the Great Flood of 1934 when mud and torrential floods destroyed property and caused a number of deaths in Tiberias. It continues under the direction of KKL-JNF.

== Geology and geography ==
The Switzerland Forest covers an area of approximately 3,000 dunams. It is situated along the western fault of the Syrian-African Rift, occupying a steep slope that descends from the Poriah Heights toward the city of Tiberias and the Sea of Galilee. The slope features an average incline of 30%, dropping from an elevation of 242 meters above sea level to 208 meters below sea level [3].

The geological composition of the area consists primarily of marl, a loose, clay-rich sedimentary rock that is highly susceptible to severe erosion and mudslides when saturated by heavy rainfall. During transitional seasons, the region is prone to a localized meteorological phenomenon known as cloudbursts, characterized by torrential downpours that deliver high volumes of rainfall within a remarkably short duration.

== Environmental management and afforestation ==
The primary objective of the forest's establishment was to mitigate soil erosion, stabilize the terrain, and regulate destructive surface runoff to protect the city of Tiberias below. During the initial phases of planting under the British Mandate and early KKL-JNF management up until the late 1950s, the dominant tree species introduced were the river red gum (Eucalyptus camaldulensis) and coojong (Acacia saligna), alongside carob, buckthorn, Pistacia atlantica, and Jerusalem pine. By the 1960s, parts of the forest faced severe degradation caused by unsuited species, wildfires, uncontrolled tree felling, and overgrazing.

To rehabilitate the ecosystem, KKL-JNF implemented advanced forestry strategies, shifting toward species better adapted to the arid, clay-heavy terrain, such as the sandarac gum tree (Tetraclinis articulata), specific acacia varieties, and senna bushes. Indigenous woodland trees, including the Christ's Thorn jujube (Ziziphus spina-christi), were also introduced. In tandem with re-afforestation, extensive manual drainage engineering was executed without heavy machinery to protect the fragile soil. This included carving out a network of diversion canals, constructing culverts, and placing drainage chutes and check dams approximately every 200 meters along the forest paths to guarantee orderly water runoff directly into the Sea of Galilee.

== Tourism and infrastructure ==
KKL-JNF has developed a 6-kilometer asphalt scenic road running through the forest between Tiberias and the Poriah Hostel, which also serves as an engineered system to manage excess water flow. The forest features three main observation decks offering panoramic views of the Sea of Galilee, the Golan Heights, the Galilee mountains, and Mount Hermon. Recreational infrastructure includes several developed recreation areas, such as the Gotman and Kastanbaum sites, which are equipped with playgrounds and wheelchair-accessible picnic setups.

The forest is traversed by the Israel National Trail, which includes a dedicated multi-level overnight campsite equipped with stone-walled tent pitches surrounded by transplanted heritage carob and olive trees. A 5.5-kilometer asphalt bicycle path runs through the area, partially overlapping with the national trail.

Situated within the forest limits on the eastern escarpment of Mount Poriah is Ein Poriah (also known as Ein Katanya), a natural spring draining into a storage pool. KKL-JNF has restored the site's historic aqueduct and surrounding pools, landscaping the area with date palms and tamarisk trees for public recreation.
