= Poria – Neve Oved =

Poria - Neve Oved: פּוֹרִיָּה - נְוֵה עוֹבֵד (Hebrew)
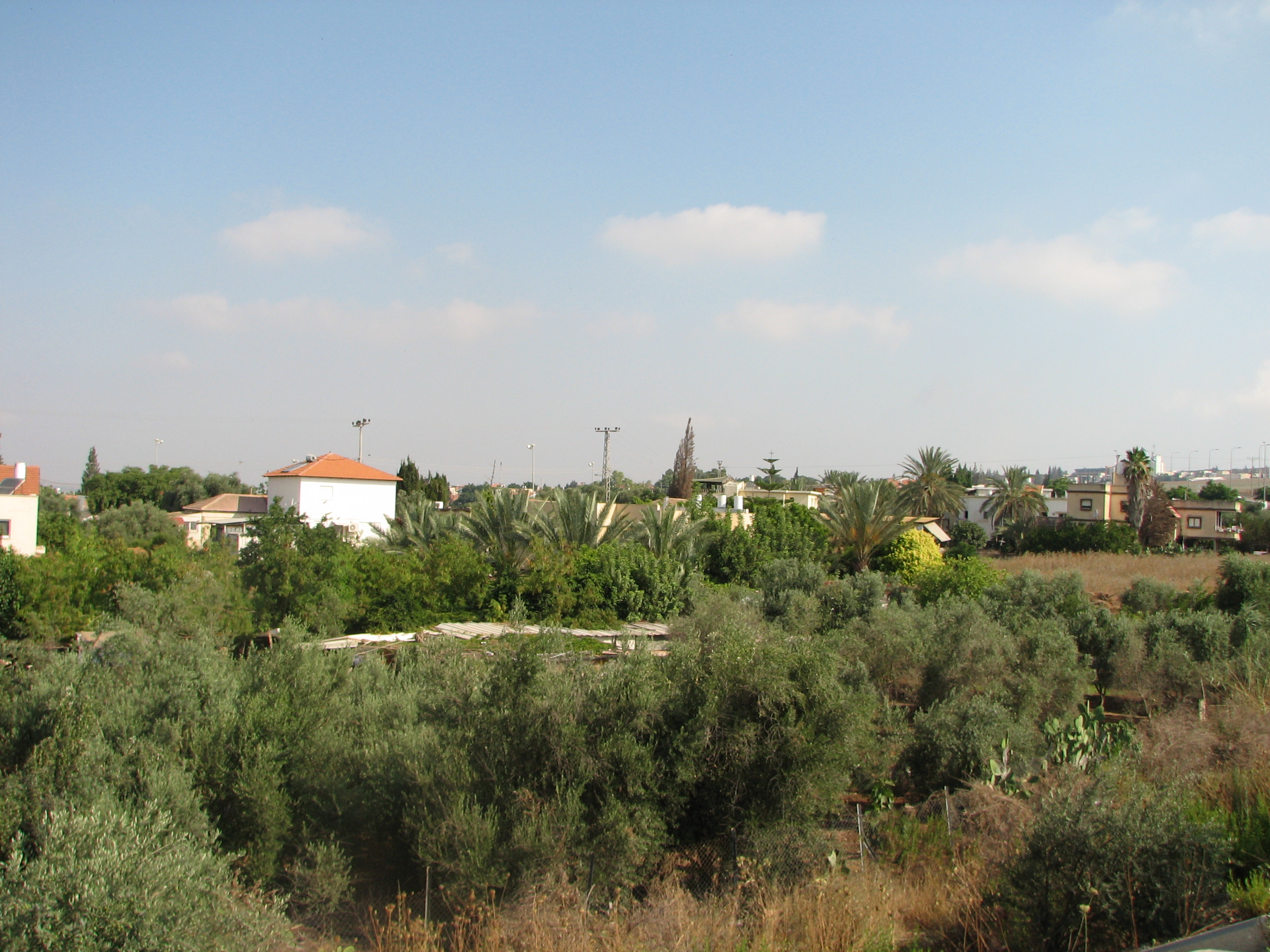

- Location within Northeast Israel Location within Israel
- Coordinates: 32°44′40″N 35°32′20″E
- Country: Israel
- District: Northern
- Subdistrict: Kinneret
- Council: Emek HaYarden
- Founded: 1949
- Founder: North African immigrants
- Population (2024): 1,630

Poria – Neve Oved or Poriya – Neve Oved (Hebrew: פּוֹרִיָּה - נְוֵה עוֹבֵד) is a community settlement in northern Israel. Located on the Poriya Ridge to the south-west of the Sea of Galilee near Tiberias, it falls under the jurisdiction of Emek HaYarden Regional Council. In 2024 it had a population of 1,630.

== History ==
The village was founded in 1949 by immigrants from North Africa. In the past most of its residents worked in local factories or nearby kibbutzim, but today most are professionals working in Tiberias and the Lower Galilee.
