= Eastern Lower Galilee Natural Region =

Coordinates: 32°48′50″N 35°26′40″E

- Natural Region
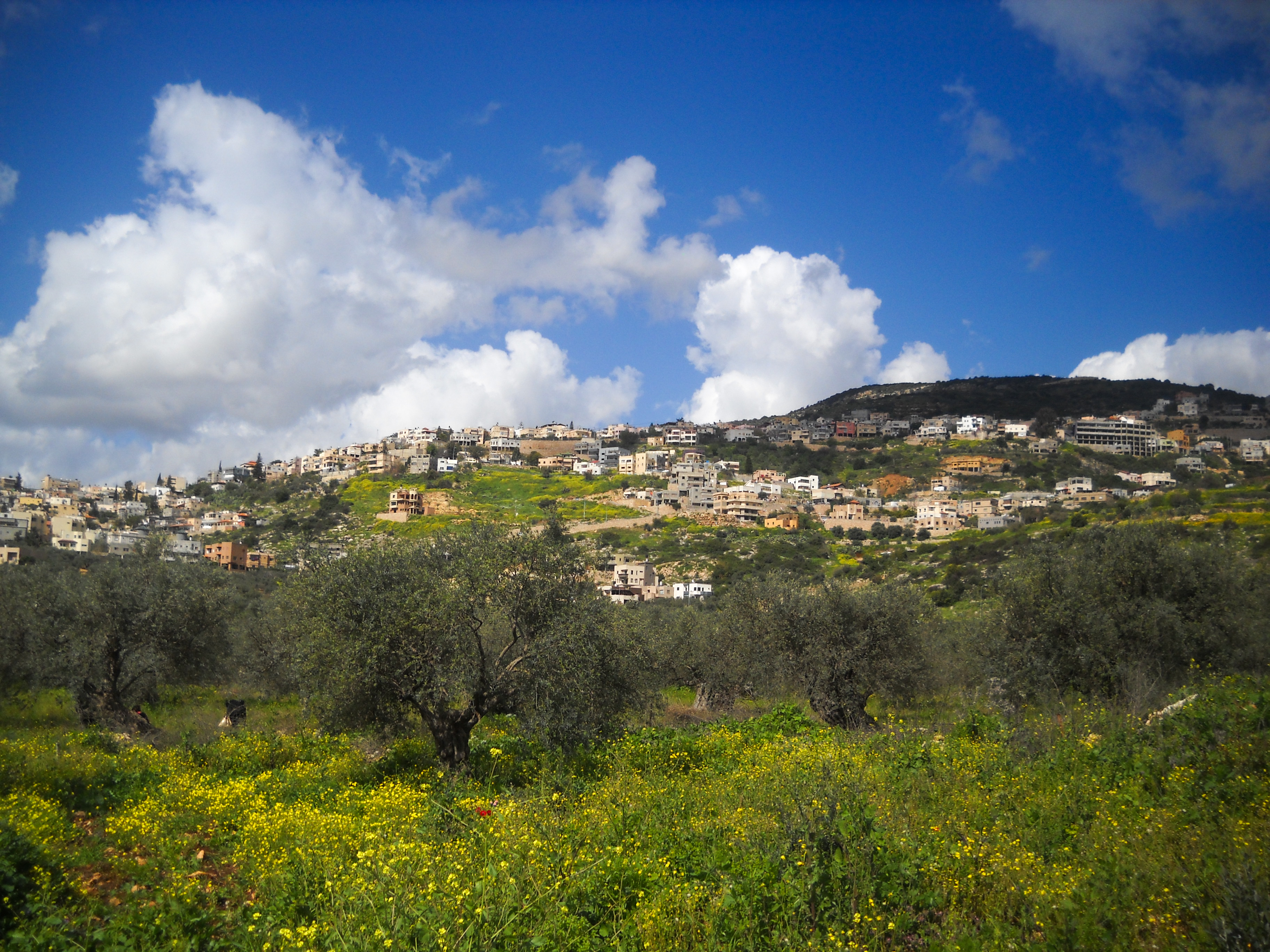
- View of Maghar, the largest city in the Eastern Lower Galilee Natural Region
- Interactive map of Eastern Lower Galilee Natural Region
- Country: Israel
- District: Northern
- Subdistrict: Kinneret
- Largest City: Maghar

Area
  - Total: 335 km^{2} (129 sq mi)

Population (2024)
  - Total: 53,348

Ethnicity
  - Jews and others: 37.4%
  - Arabs: 55.0%

The Eastern Lower Galilee Natural Region is a natural region in the Kinneret Subdistrict, in the Northern District of Israel. Maghar is the largest city in the natural region.

== Geography ==
Districts, Subdistricts and Natural Regions of the State of Israel, 2018

As its name suggests, the natural region consists of the eastern portion of the Lower Galilee region, located between Tiberias and Tur'an and stretching from Maghar in the north to Kfar Tavor in the south. The western portion of the Lower Galilee is mostly part of the Nazareth-Tir'an Mountains Natural Region and Shefar'am Natural Region, which are in the Jezreel and Acre subdistricts respectively. It has an area of 335 km^{2}. The largest city in the natural region is Maghar, which contains 44 percent of the natural region's population. Other notable towns in the natural region are Eilabun, Kfar Tavor, Kfar Kama, and Yavne'el. It mostly overlaps with the Lower Galilee Regional Council.

== Demographics ==
55 percent of the residents of the Eastern Lower Galilee Natural Region are Arab, a majority of whom are Druze and a significant minority of whom are Christians. Most Druze live in Maghar, while Eilabun has a majority of Christians. 37 percent of residents are Jews, who live in Kfar Tavor, Yavne'el, and the kibbutzim in the area. Seven percent of the natural region's population are Circassians, who are concentrated in the town of Kfar Kama, and whom the Israel Central Bureau of Statistics incorrectly counts as Arabs.

Historical population
Year	Pop.	±%
1972	13,300	—
1983	20,100	+51.1%
1995	29,000	+44.3%
2008	41,500	+43.1%
2022	51,655	+24.5%
2024	53,348	+3.3%

== Administrative local authorities ==
Cities	Local Councils	Villages
Maghar	Eilabun; Kfar Kama; Kfar Tavor; Yavne'el	Emek HaYarden: Ravid; Lower Galilee: Arbel; Beit Keshet; Giv'at Avni; HaZor'im; Hodayot; Ilaniya; Kadoorie; Kfar Hittim; Kfar Kisch; Kfar Zeitim; Lavi; Masad; Mitzpa; Sde Ilan; Shadmot Dvora; Sharona

== Voting Patterns ==
In the 2022 election, 41 percent of voters in the natural region voted for the parties of the center-left coalition led by Yair Lapid, while 28.1 percent voted for the Arab parties and 27.6 percent voted for the parties of the right-wing coalition led by Benjamin Netanyahu.

In the 2026 election, 45 percent of voters in the natural region voted for the parties of the center-left coalition led by Gadi Eisenkot, while 27 percent voted for the Arab parties and 23 percent voted for the parties of the right-wing coalition led by Benjamin Netanyahu. An additional 2.1 percent voted for the Reservists, and 1.9 percent voted for Amcha Yisrael. Voter turnout increased 35 percent from the 2022 election.
