= Mitzpe Netofa =

Mitzpe Netofa: מִצְפֵּה נְטוֹפָה (Hebrew)
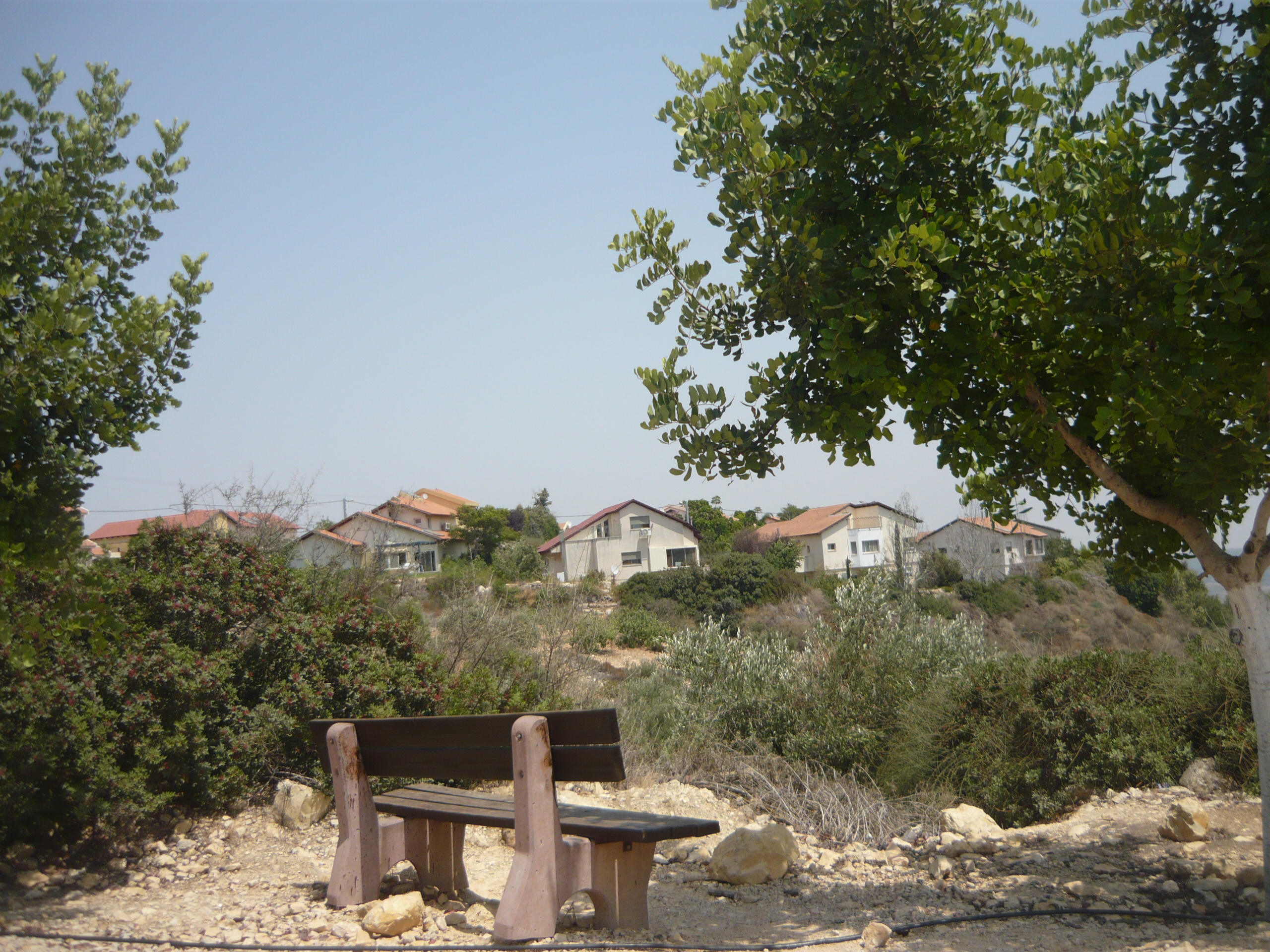

- Location within Northeast Israel Location within Israel
- Coordinates: 32°48′10″N 35°23′4″E
- Country: Israel
- District: Northern
- Subdistrict: Jezreel
- Council: Lower Galilee
- Affiliation: Amana
- Founded: 1981
- Founder: Nahal Movement
- Population (2024): 970

Mitzpe Netofa (Hebrew: מִצְפֵּה נְטוֹפָה) is a religious community settlement in northern Israel. Located adjacent to the Arab village Tur'an, it falls under the jurisdiction of the Lower Galilee Regional Council. In 2024 it had a population of 970.

== Demographics ==
As of 2021, Mitzpe Netofa had an estimated population of 1,054 residents, all of whom identified as Jewish. The settlement covers an area of approximately 0.39 square kilometers, resulting in a high population density of around 2,702 people per square kilometer. Between 2013 and 2021, the population grew at an average annual rate of 2.9%, indicating a relatively steady pace of demographic expansion.

The gender distribution in 2021 was nearly balanced, with 534 males (50.7%) and 520 females (49.3%). The population is notably youthful, with children aged 0–14 comprising 38.4% of residents. Adults aged 15–64 made up 54.1% of the population, while seniors aged 65 and over accounted for 7.5%.

== History ==
Mitzpe Netofa was established originally as a Nahal settlement in June 1979 and was civilianized later in October 1983. Located in the Lower Galilee on the Tur'an mountain range, the community overlooks the Beit Netofa Valley to the west and the Golan Heights to the east. Since its civilianization, the settlement has grown into a vibrant religious community settlement and forms part of a network of religious communities in the region, including Shadmot Dvora, Beit Rimon, Lavi, HaZor'im, and Hoshaya.

The community was founded with the vision of combining a religious lifestyle with a deep connection to the land of Israel. Over the years, Mitzpe Netofa has attracted a diverse group of families engaged in a variety of professions. Its central location in the Galilee allows residents easy access to nearby cities such as Tiberias, Afula, Safed, and Haifa. The settlement has seen continuous development, including residential expansion, the construction of new public buildings, and the enhancement of community services.

== Notable residents ==
- Ofer Winter (b. 1971), retired army general
