= Lower Galilee Regional Council =

Regional council in northern Israel

Lower Galilee Regional Council מועצה אזורית הגליל התחתון
- Regional council
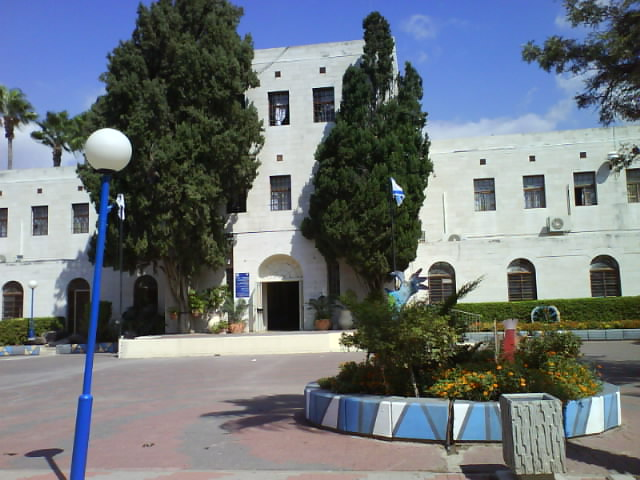
- Kadoorie Agricultural High School
- Interactive map of Lower Galilee Regional Council
- Country: Israel
- District: Northern
- Subdistrict: Kinneret (mostly), Jezreel
- Natural region: Eastern Lower Galilee, Nazareth-Tir'an Mountains

Government
  - Head of Municipality: Nitzan Peleg

Population (2024)
  - Total: 13,414
- Website: {{URL|example.com|optional display text}}

Lower Galilee Regional Council (Hebrew: מועצה אזורית הגליל התחתון, Mo'atza Azorit HaGalil HaTahton) is a regional council in the Northern District of Israel. It encompasses 18 towns and villages, mostly between the cities of Tiberias and Tur'an, in the Lower Galilee region. Its offices are located close to the Kadoorie Agricultural High School.

== Settlements ==
=== Kibbutzim ===
- Beit Keshet
- Beit Rimon
- Lavi

=== Moshavim ===
- Arbel
- HaZor'im
- Ilaniya
- Kfar Hittim
- Kfar Kisch
- Kfar Zeitim
- Mitzpa
- Sde Ilan
- Shadmot Dvora
- Sharona

=== Community settlements ===
- Giv'at Avni
- Masad
- Mitzpe Netofa

=== Youth villages ===
- Hodayot
- Kadoorie

== Demographics ==
Historical population
Year	Pop.	±%
1972	2,100	—
1983	3,300	+57.1%
1995	5,600	+69.7%
2008	9,300	+66.1%
2022	12,799	+37.6%
2024	13,414	+4.8%

== Voting Patterns ==
In the 2022 election, 51 percent of voters in the regional council voted for the parties of the right-wing coalition led by Benjamin Netanyahu, while 49 percent voted for the parties of the center-left coalition led by Yair Lapid and 0.1 percent voted for the Arab parties.

In the 2026 election, 45 percent of voters in the regional council voted for the parties of the center-left coalition led by Gadi Eisenkot, while 40 percent voted for the parties of the right-wing coalition led by Benjamin Netanyahu and 0.2 percent voted for the Arab parties. An additional 4.7 percent voted for the Reservists, and 9.6 percent voted for Amcha Yisrael (Ofer Winter, the leader of Amcha Yisrael, lives in Mitzpe Netofa). Voter turnout increased 17 percent from the 2022 election.
