= Masad =

Masad may refer to:

- Ala ud din Masud
- Ilana Masad, Israeli American writer
- Məsəd, Azerbaijan
- Masad, Israel
