= Giv'at Avni =

Community settlement in northern Israel

Giv'at Avni: גִּבְעַת אַבְנִי (Hebrew)
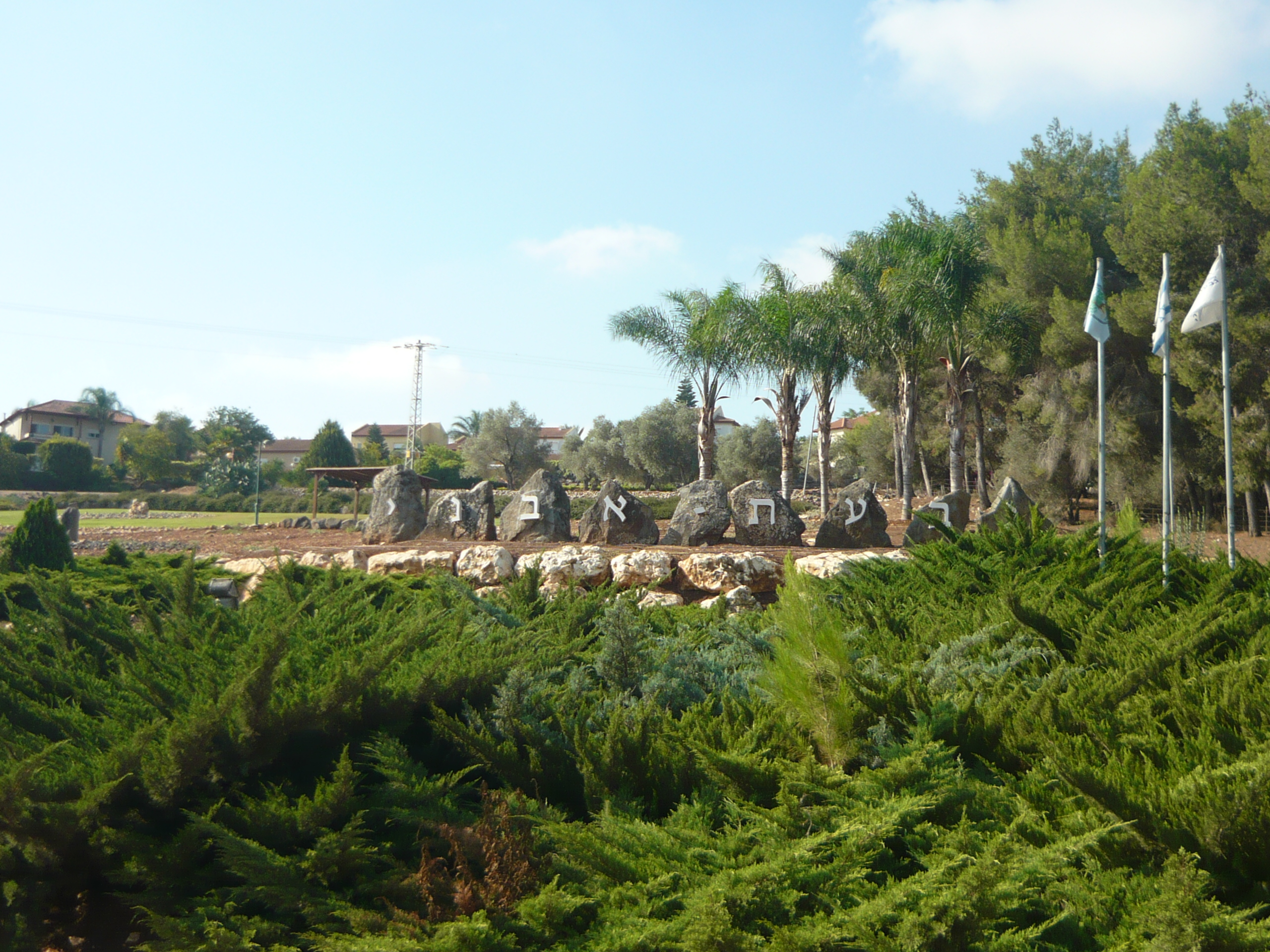

- Location within Northeast Israel
- Coordinates: 32°46′31″N 35°26′19″E
- Country: Israel
- District: Northern
- Subdistrict: Kinneret
- Council: Lower Galilee
- Founded: 1991
- Founder: Regional council
- Population (2024): 2,143

Giv'at Avni (Hebrew: גִּבְעַת אַבְנִי) is a community settlement in northern Israel. Located adjacent to the Sea of Galilee and Tiberias, it falls under the jurisdiction of Lower Galilee Regional Council. In 2024 it had a population of 2,143.

== History ==
The village was founded in 1991 by the Lower Galilee Regional Council. It was named for Shlomo Avni, director-general of the Ministry of Construction and Housing. Lavi Forest, named for the Jewish community that flourished there during the Mishnaic and Talmudic periods, is located on the western edge of Givat Avni, on land near the depopulated Palestinian village of Lubya.

== Archaeology ==
In an archaeological survey of the area, flint outcrops and flint extraction surfaces were discovered along with numerous flint items, knapping piles, flakes and cores.

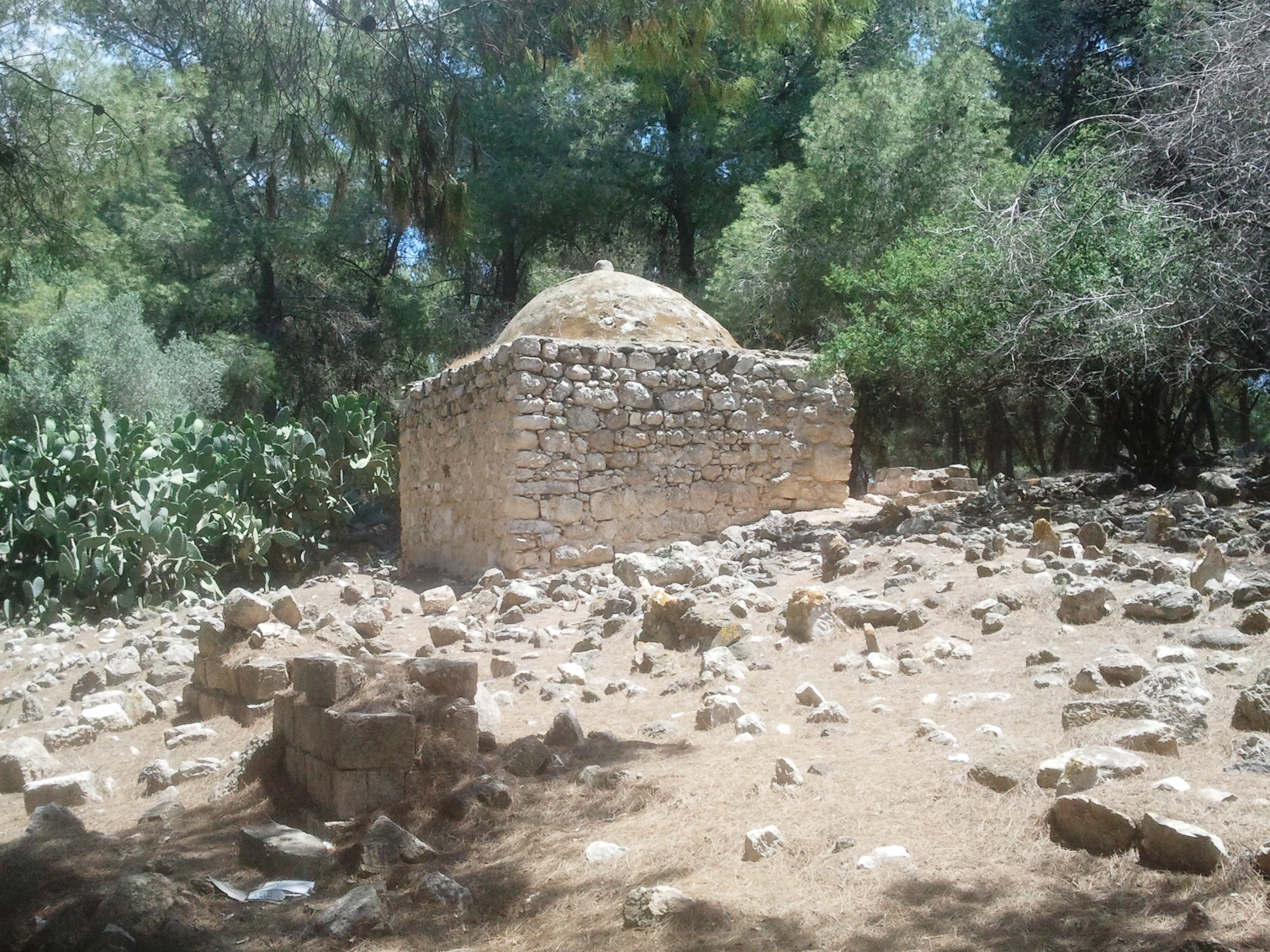
Sheikh's tomb
