= Sharona =

Sharona: שרונה (Hebrew)
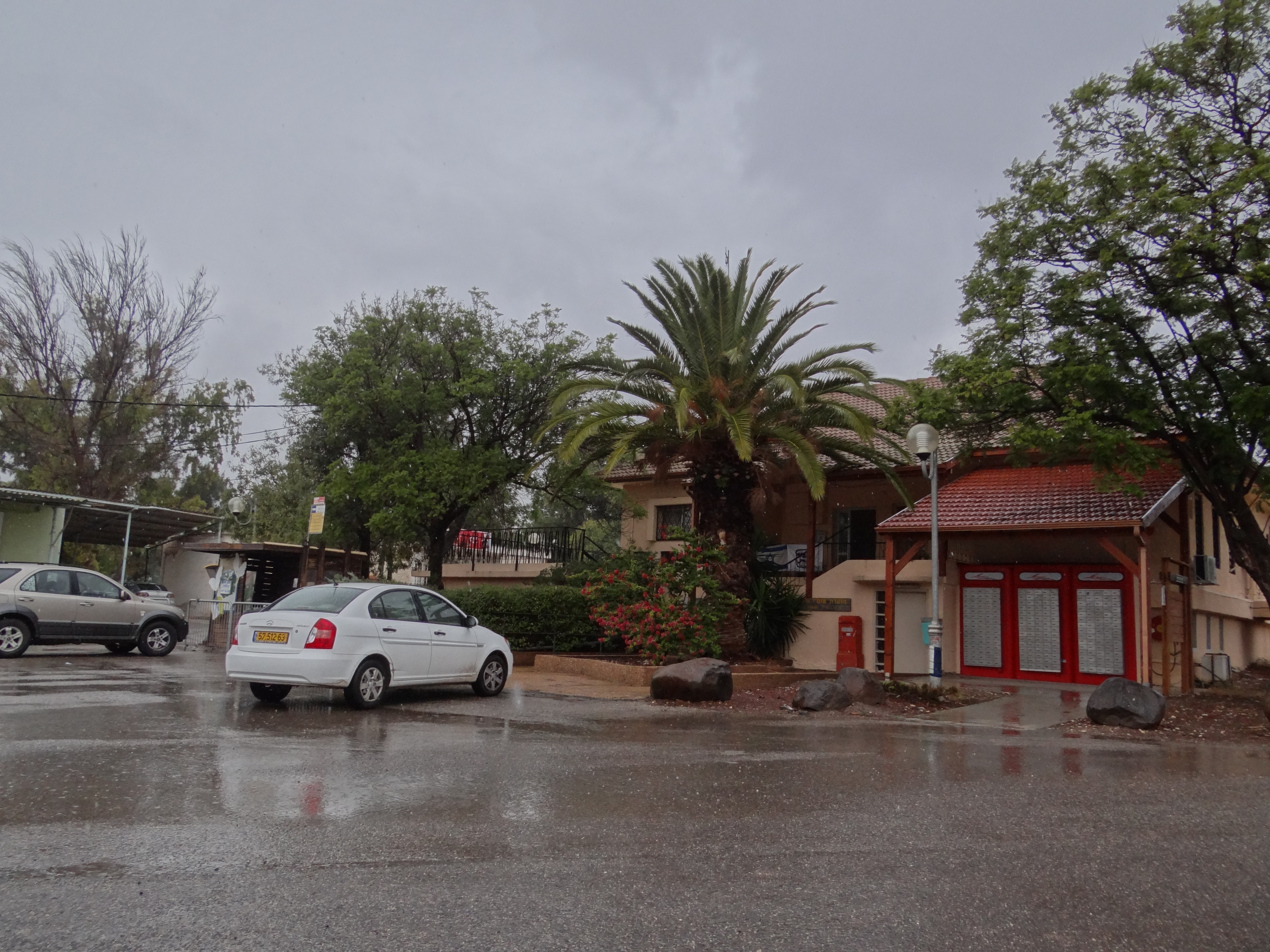

- Location within Northeast Israel
- Coordinates: 32°43′36″N 35°28′0″E
- Grid position: 194/235 PAL
- Country: Israel
- District: Northern
- Subdistrict: Kinneret
- Council: Lower Galilee
- Affiliation: Moshavim Movement
- Founded: 1938
- Founder: Gordonia members
- Population (2024): 680
- Website: www.sarona.co.il

Sharona (Hebrew: שָׁרוֹנָה /saˈʁona/, but publicized in English as /ʃəˈɹoʊnə/) is a moshav in northern Israel. Located south-west of Tiberias, it falls under the jurisdiction of Lower Galilee Regional Council. In 2024, it had a population of 680.

== History ==
=== Ancient times ===
Approximately 1.5 kilometers southeast of Sharona lies the ruin of Horvat Sharona, where a water spring with a well-preserved spring house can be still found. In the 4th century, Eusebius mentioned a district called Sharona extending from Mount Tabor to the Sea of Tiberias.

Archaeologist Eleazar Sukenik identified the remains of an ancient synagogue at the site, based on a basalt lintel decorated with a seven-branched menorah, flanked by two birds, and a rosette. He also noted another basalt stone, probably part of a frieze, carved with grapevine motifs. West of the ruin are the remains of a church, and to the south are two impressive tombs. According to archaeologist Zvi Ilan, ancient Sharona appears to have originally contained a synagogue, with a church constructed later at the periphery of the site.

=== Crusader period ===
In the early 13th century, the geographer Yaqut al-Hamawi described Sârûniyyah as "a pass near Tabariyya, you go up it to reach At Tûr".

=== Ottoman era ===
Incorporated into the Ottoman Empire in 1517 with all of Palestine, Sharona appeared under the name of Saruniyya in the 1596 tax registers as being in the nahiya (subdistrict) of Tabariyya under the Liwa of Safad. It had an entirely Muslim population consisting of 17 households. They paid taxes on wheat, barley, occasional revenues, goats and beehives; a total of 3592 Akçe.

A map from Napoleon's invasion of 1799 by Pierre Jacotin showed the place, though unnamed.

In 1875, Victor Guérin visited Sarona and noted:

"This village is divided into two quarters; the houses are rudely built on two hillocks rising round a valley. This is watered from a spring enclosed in a sort of small square chamber, the floor of which is formed of large slabs, and which has a vaulted vestibule built of regular stones."

In 1881, the Palestine Exploration Fund's Survey of Western Palestine noted "basaltic stone houses, containing about 250 Moslems, situated in arable plain, without trees."

According to Avneri, Sarona was settled by Circassian refugees from the Caucasus in 1878, but by 1910 they had moved elsewhere and had been replaced by Arabs. The land was purchased from the Arabs by the Jewish Colonization Association in 1910.

In 1913, a Jewish settlement called Rama, but also called Sarona, was established close to the Arab village by ahuza (estate) members from Chicago. The impact of World War I, poor conditions, and the lack of sufficient manpower kept the new settlement impoverished and debt-ridden.

=== British Mandate era ===
In the 1922 census of Palestine, conducted by the British Mandate authorities, the new and old settlements together contained 92 inhabitants; 77 Muslims and 15 Jews. In the summer at the end of 1923, additional Jewish settlers, Brisk kevutzah from Kfar Yehezkel, arrived with help from the Jewish National Fund, but by the end of 1928 the settlement had been abandoned and the land returned to the Palestine Jewish Colonization Association, the heir to the Jewish Colonization Association. Half the land was leased to Arab tenants. At the time of the 1931 census the population of Sarona was 114, all Muslims, in a total of 23 houses. The nearby Arab village of Kafr Sabt, prior to the outbreak of hostilities in the 1948 Arab Israeli War, had a population of 900 Arabs.

==== Moshav ====
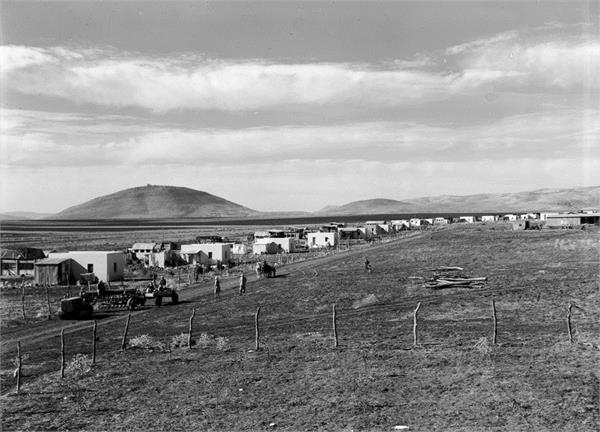
Sharona 1947, Mount Tabor in distance

In 1938, a moshav was established by members of the Gordonia organization, with the cost borne by the Palestine Jewish Colonization Association and the Agricultural Workers Federation.

In the 1945 statistics, the population was recorded as 110 Jews and no Arabs.

== Bibliography ==
- Avneri, Arieh L. (1984). The Claim of Dispossession: Jewish Land-settlement and the Arabs, 1878–1948. Transaction Publishers. ISBN 0-87855-964-7.
- Barron, J.B., ed. (1923). Palestine: Report and General Abstracts of the Census of 1922. Government of Palestine.
- Conder, C.R.; Kitchener, H.H. (1881). The Survey of Western Palestine: Memoirs of the Topography, Orography, Hydrography, and Archaeology. Vol. 1. London: Committee of the Palestine Exploration Fund. (pp. 370, 379414)
- Glass, Joseph B. (2002). From new Zion to old Zion : American Jewish immigration and settlement in Palestine, 1917 – 1939. Wayne State University Press. ISBN 0814328423.
- Guérin, V. (1880). Description Géographique Historique et Archéologique de la Palestine (in French). Vol. 3: Galilee, pt. 1. Paris: L'Imprimerie Nationale.
- Hadawi, S. (1970). Village Statistics of 1945: A Classification of Land and Area ownership in Palestine. Palestine Liberation Organization Research Center.
- Hütteroth, W.-D.; Abdulfattah, K. (1977). Historical Geography of Palestine, Transjordan and Southern Syria in the Late 16th Century. Erlanger Geographische Arbeiten, Sonderband 5. Erlangen, Germany: Vorstand der Fränkischen Geographischen Gesellschaft. ISBN 3-920405-41-2.
- Karmon, Y. (1960). "An Analysis of Jacotin's Map of Palestine" (PDF). Israel Exploration Journal. 10 (3, 4): 155–173, 244–253. Archived from the original (PDF) on 2017-12-01.
- Mills, E., ed. (1932). Census of Palestine 1931. Population of Villages, Towns and Administrative Areas. Jerusalem: Government of Palestine.
- Palmer, E.H. (1881). The Survey of Western Palestine: Arabic and English Name Lists Collected During the Survey by Lieutenants Conder and Kitchener, R. E. Transliterated and Explained by E.H. Palmer. Committee of the Palestine Exploration Fund.
- Rhode, H. (1979). Administration and Population of the Sancak of Safed in the Sixteenth Century. Columbia University. Archived from the original on 2020-03-01.
- Strange, le, G. (1890). Palestine Under the Moslems: A Description of Syria and the Holy Land from A.D. 650 to 1500. Committee of the Palestine Exploration Fund.
