= Gürcuva =

- Location within Azerbaijan
- Coordinates: 40°37′08″N 47°28′45″E
- Country: Azerbaijan
- Rayon: Agdash
- Time zone: UTC+4 (AZT)
  - Summer (DST): UTC+5 (AZT)

Gürcuva (also, Kyurdzhuva and Kyurdzhyuva) is a village in the Agdash Rayon of Azerbaijan. The village forms part of the municipality of Məşəd.
