= Sde Ilan =

Moshav in northern Israel

Sde Ilan: שְׂדֵה אִילָן (Hebrew)
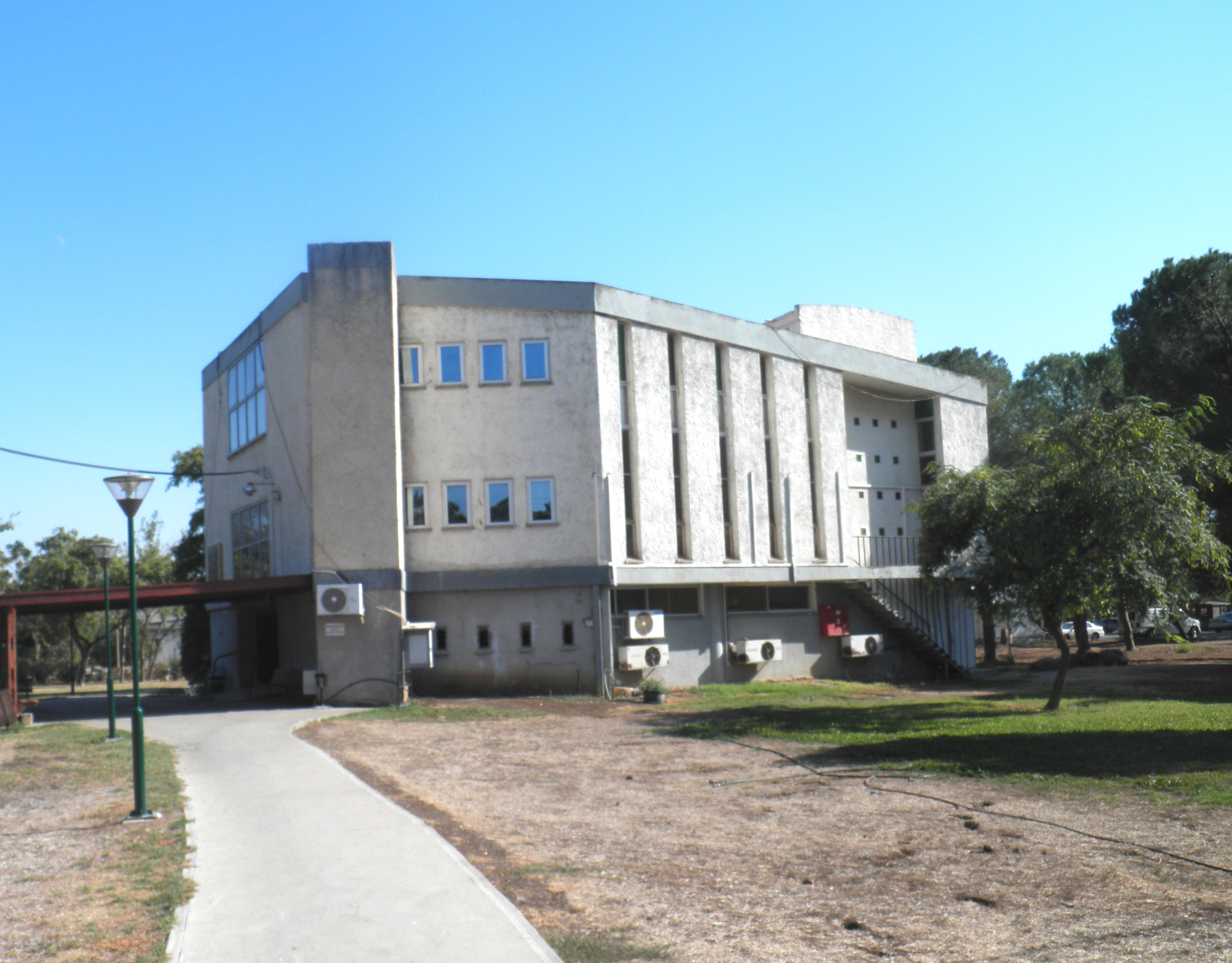

- Location within Northeast Israel
- Coordinates: 32°44′54″N 35°25′24″E
- Country: Israel
- District: Northern
- Subdistrict: Kinneret
- Council: Lower Galilee
- Affiliation: Hapoel HaMizrachi
- Founded: 1949
- Founder: Hapoel HaMizrachi and JAFI
- Population (2024): 789
- Website: www.sde-ilan.com

Sde Ilan (Hebrew: שְׂדֵה אִילָן) is a religious moshav in northern Israel. Located to the west of Tiberias, it falls under the jurisdiction of Lower Galilee Regional Council. In 2024 it had a population of 789.

== History ==
The moshav was founded in 1949 with the assistance of Hapoel HaMizrachi and the Jewish Agency for Israel. Its name originates from the fifth tractate of the Mishnah.

Sde Ilan was settled on land to the west of Kafr Sabt, and to the east of Al-Shajara.
