= Kfar Kisch =

Moshav in northern Israel

Kfar Kisch: כְּפַר קִישׁ (Hebrew)
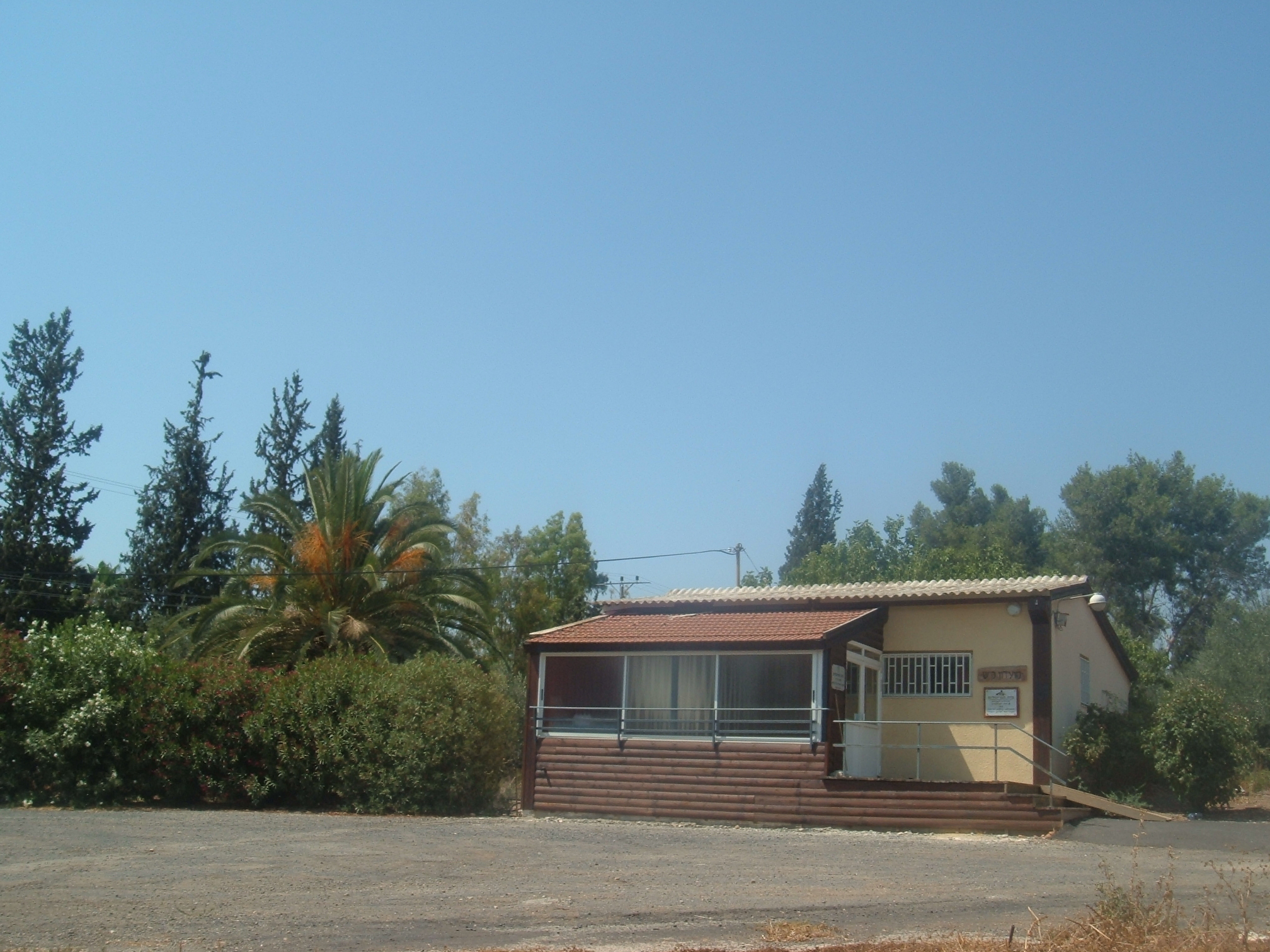

- Location within Northeast Israel
- Coordinates: 32°40′2″N 35°26′55″E
- Country: Israel
- District: Northern
- Subdistrict: Kinneret
- Council: Lower Galilee
- Affiliation: Moshavim Movement
- Founded: 1946
- Founder: Demobilised soldiers
- Population (2024): 779

Kfar Kisch (Hebrew: כְּפַר קִישׁ) is a moshav in northern Israel. Located adjacent to Mount Tabor, it falls under the jurisdiction of Lower Galilee Regional Council. In 2024 it had a population of 779.

== History ==
It was established in 1946 by Jewish soldiers demobilised from the British Army after World War II having served under Frederick Kisch, after whom the village was named. However political fractures led many of the founders to leave within the first year. A water shortage which forced the residents to transport water from the Tabor stream without proper equipment added to the problems, and until 1953 a steady stream of founding residents left the village. In that year conditions improved and Kfar Kisch began to absorb Jewish immigrants from Poland, Hungary, and the Soviet Union. The village is located near the depopulated Palestinian village of Ma'dhar, south of the old village site.

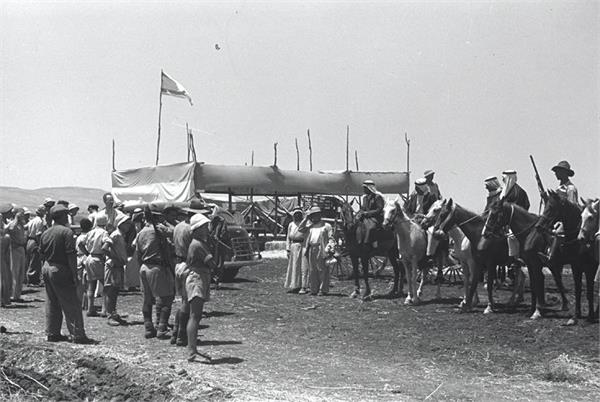
Kfar Kisch founding ceremony 18 July 1946

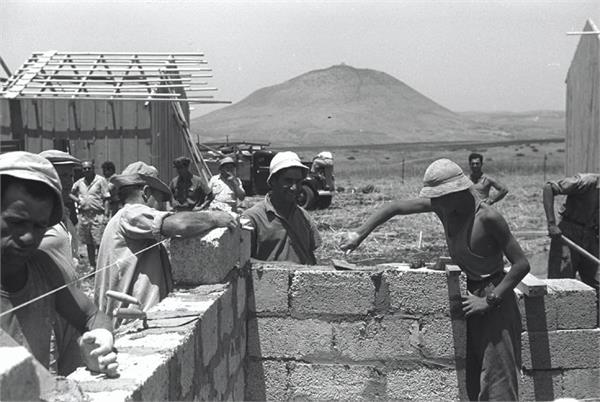
Kfar Kisch

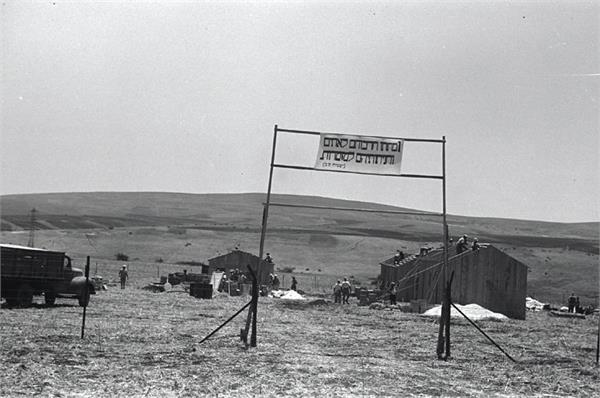
Kfar Kisch first barracks

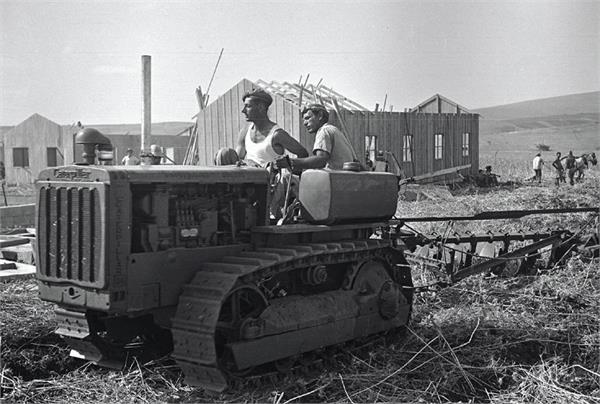
Kfar Kisch

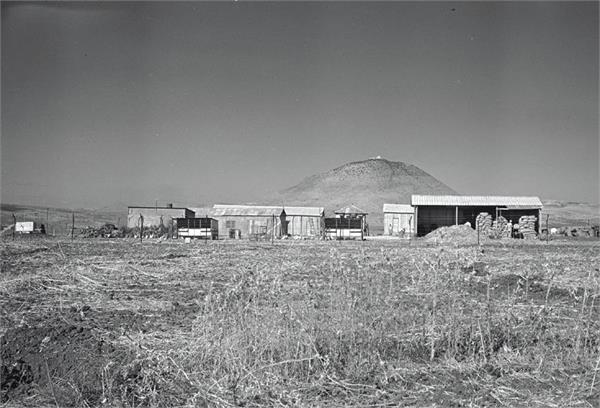
Kfar Kisch
