= Hodayot =

Hodayot: הוֹדָיוֹת (Hebrew)
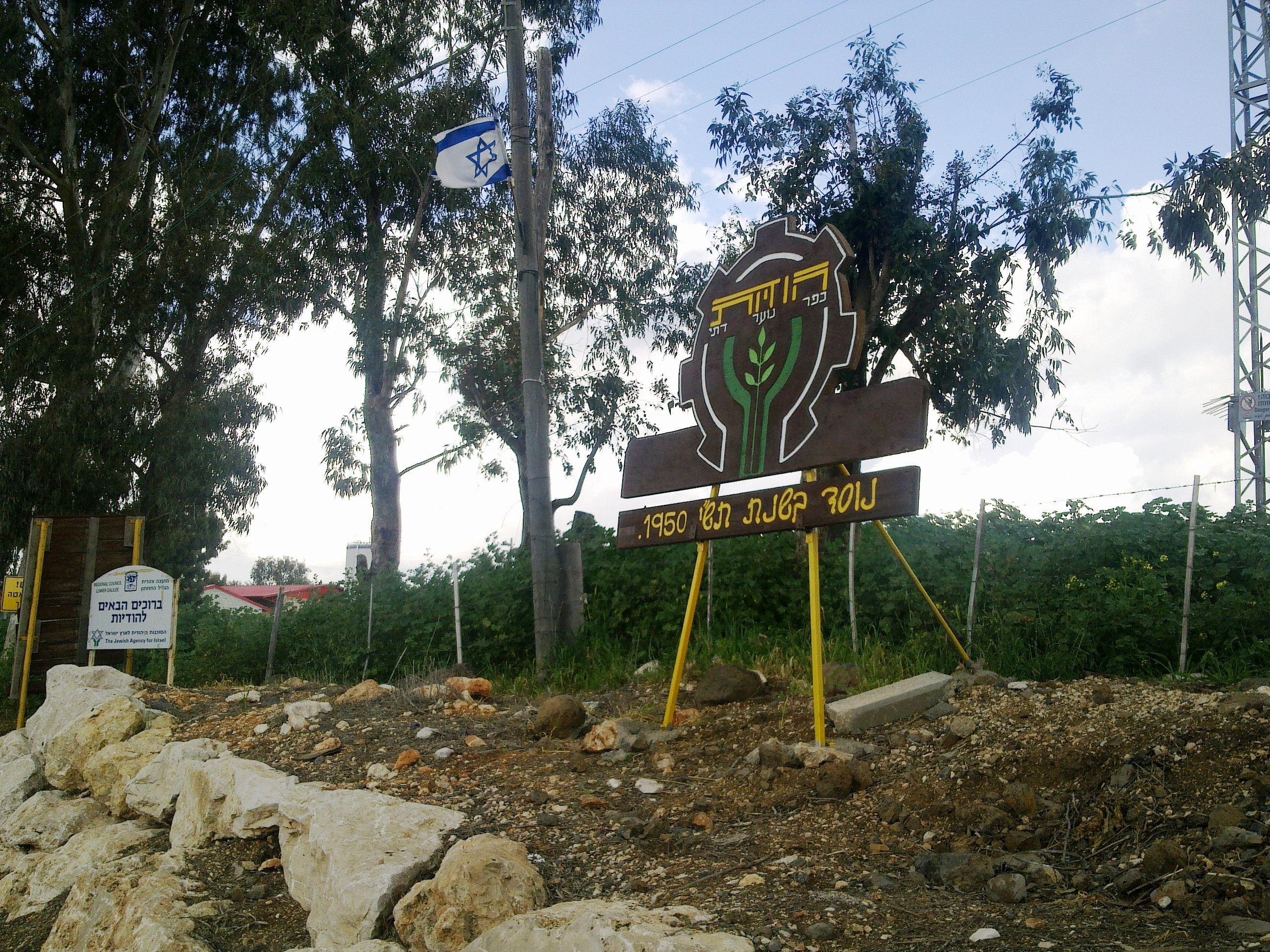

- Location within Northeast Israel
- Coordinates: 32°47′19″N 35°26′6″E
- Country: Israel
- District: Northern
- Subdistrict: Kinneret
- Council: Lower Galilee
- Founded: 1950
- Population (2024): 108
- Website: Official website (in Hebrew)

Hodayot (Hebrew: הוֹדָיוֹת) (lit. "Thanksgiving") is a religious boarding school and youth village in northern Israel. Located to the west of the Sea of Galilee, it falls under the jurisdiction of Lower Galilee Regional Council. In 2024 it had a population of 108.

== History ==
Hodayot was founded in May 1950 on the early site of Kibbutz Lavi, which moved half a kilometer eastward. It has 211 students, many of them of Ethiopian origin.

One of the special tracks offered by the high school is a police studies program, with classes in criminology, sociology and crime-solving. The school also has a life sciences and agriculture track. Medicinal herbs are grown in the school's greenhouses, based on the teachings of Maimonides, and the students experiment with various composting techniques.

== See also ==
- Education in Israel
