= Lubya =

Lubya لوبيا Lubiya, Lubia
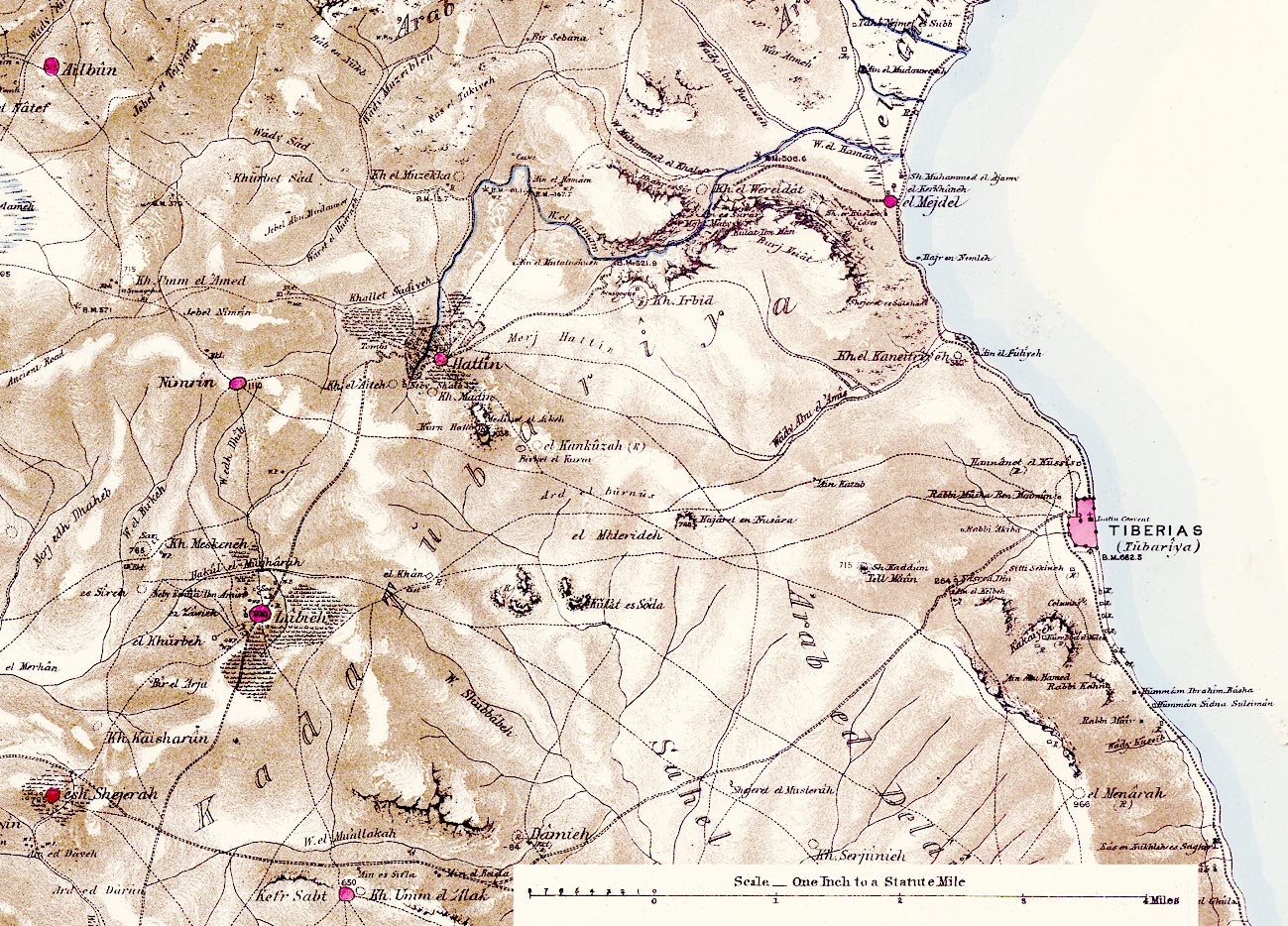
- Map of the area from the 1870s
- Etymology: "Bean"
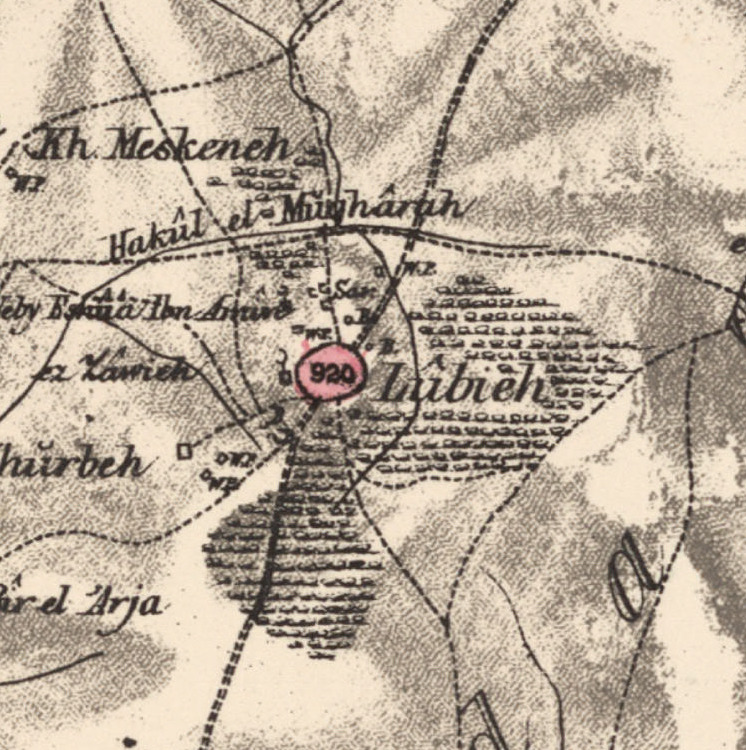
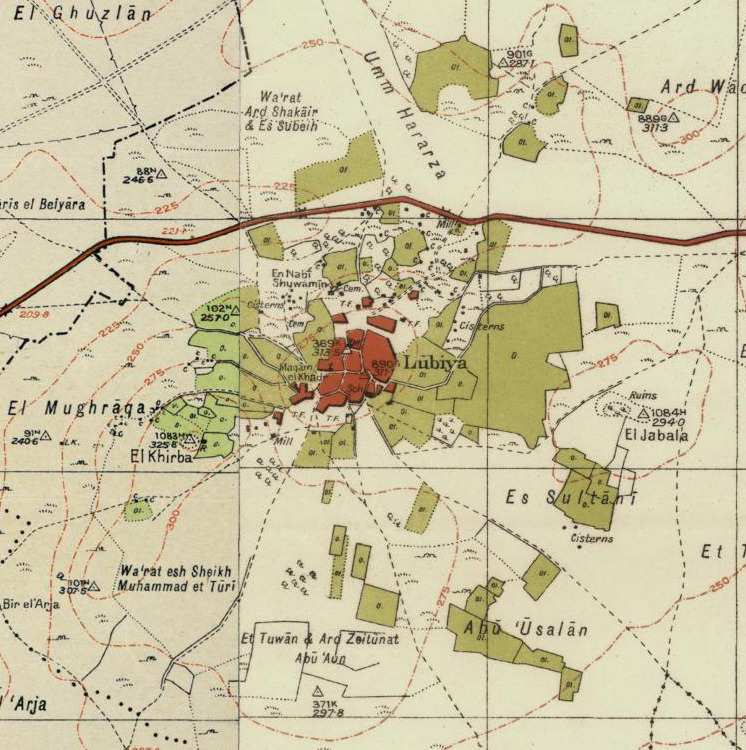
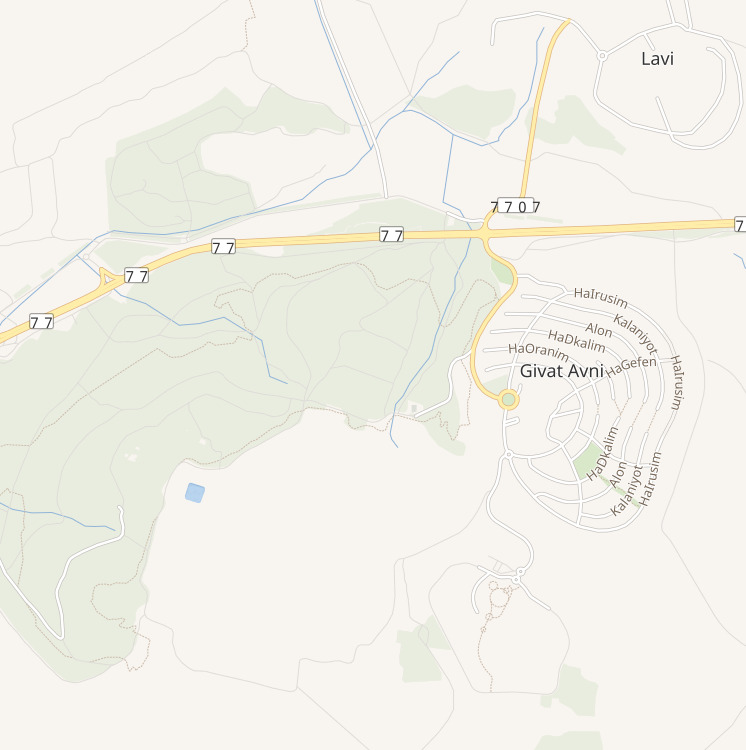
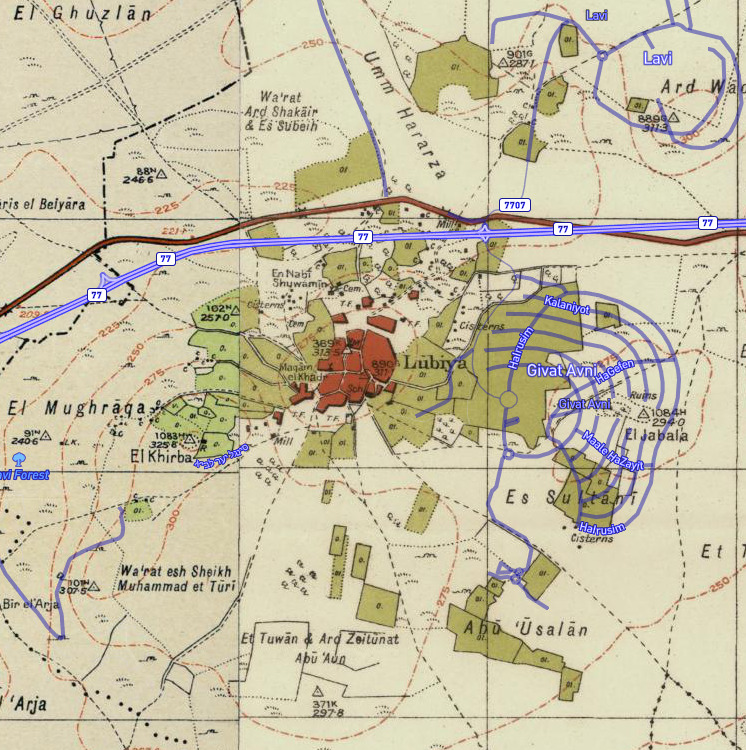
- 1870s map 1940s map modern map 1940s with modern overlay map A series of historical maps of the area around Lubya (click the buttons)

- Location within Mandatory Palestine
- Coordinates: 32°46′33″N 35°25′46″E
- Palestine grid: 190/242
- Geopolitical entity: Mandatory Palestine
- Subdistrict: Tiberias
- Date of depopulation: July 16–17, 1948

Area
  - Total: 39,629 dunams (39.629 km^{2}; 15.301 sq mi)

Population (1945)
  - Total: 2,350
- Cause(s) of depopulation: Military assault by Yishuv forces
- Current Localities: Lavi, Lavi Pine Forest, South African Park

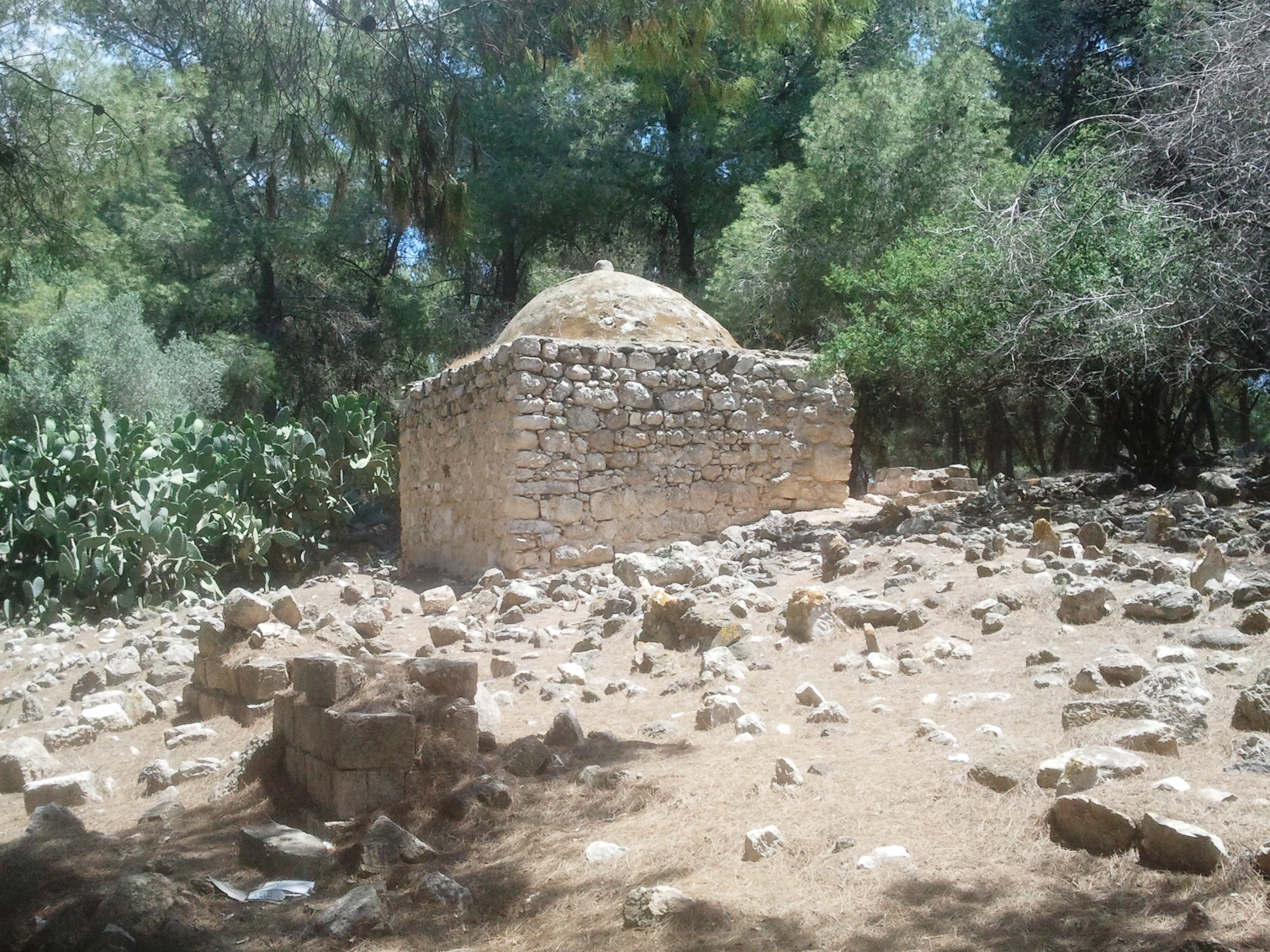
Al-Nabi Shwamin grave in Lubya, called Neby Eshua Ibn Amin in 1881

Lubya (Arabic: لوبيا "bean"), sometimes referred to as Lubia, Lubieh and Loubieh, was a Palestinian Arab town located ten kilometers west of Tiberias that was captured, ethnically cleansed, and destroyed by Israel during the 1948 Arab-Israeli War where its residents were forcefully evacuated and became refugees. Nearby villages included Nimrin to the north, Hittin to the northwest, and al-Shajara to the south; Each of those villages were also ethnically cleansed.

Lubya had a total land area of 39,629 dunams (3,963ha), of which 83% was Palestinian-owned and the remainder public property. Most of its cultivable land was planted with cereals while only 1,500 dunams (150 ha) were planted with olive groves. The village's built-up area was 210 dunams (21 ha).

== History ==
Archaeological excavations have revealed remains dating from the Roman era, second century BCE until the fifth century CE.

The village was known as Lubia by the Crusaders and was a rest stop for Saladin's Ayyubid army prior to the Battle of Hattin. It is the birthplace of a prominent 15th century Muslim scholar Abu Bakr al-Lubyani, who taught Islamic religious sciences in Damascus.

=== Ottoman era ===
Lubya belonged to the nahiya ("district") of Tiberias in the 1596 tax records, a few decades after the Ottoman Empire won control over the region from the Mamluks. Its population was recorded as 182 households and 32 bachelors, an estimated 1,177 persons; all Muslim. The village was required to pay taxes on its goats, beehives and its olive press, but most of the revenues (45,000 Akçe) were paid as a fixed amount. Total taxes were 46,700 akçe.

In 1743, the Ottoman governor of Damascus, Sulayman Pasha al-Azm died in the village while on his way to confront the rebellious de facto Arab ruler of the Galilee, Zahir al-Umar. A map by Pierre Jacotin, from 1799 showed the place named Loubia.

Lubya is near the site of Khan Lubya which is filled with the ruins of a pool, cisterns and large building stones. This site was probably a caravansary during medieval times.

In the early 19th century, James Silk Buckingham described Lubya as a very large village on top of a high hill. Johann Ludwig Burckhardt, a Swiss traveler to Palestine, referred to the village as "Louby" and noted that wild artichokes covered the village plain. The American scholar Edward Robinson, who passed through the village in 1838, noted that it had suffered greatly from the Galilee earthquake of 1837, with 143 villagers reported dead.

Mark Twain mentioned it in his 1869 travel book, The Innocents Abroad: We jogged along peacefully over the great caravan route from Damascus to Jerusalem and Egypt, past Lubia and other Syrian hamlets, perched, in the unvarying style, upon the summit of steep mounds and hills, and fenced round about with giant cactuses.

In 1875, the French explorer Victor Guérin visited the village, called Loubieh, and estimated it had 700 inhabitants. He further noted that: "A house built of cut stones of medium size in the direction of east and west appears to occupy the site, and to be built out of old materials formerly used for a Christian Church".

Later that century, the village was described as being built of stone, on top of a limestone hill. Its population, estimated to be between 400 and 700, cultivated olive and fig trees.

A population list from about 1887 showed Lubieh to have about 2,730 inhabitants; all Muslims.

An elementary school was established in 1895 and remained in use throughout the rule of the British Mandate of Palestine from 1923 to 1947.

=== British Mandate era ===
In the 1922 census of Palestine conducted by the British Mandate authorities the population was 1,712; 1,705 Muslims, four Christians and three Druze, increasing in the 1931 census to 1,850; 1,849 Muslims and one Christian, in a total of 405 houses. During this period, Lubya was the second largest village in the Tiberias District.

According to the Palestine Government's village statistics, Lubya had a population of 2,350 in 1945 statistics, all Muslim. All the inhabitants were Muslim. The total land area was 39,629 dunams. Of this, a total of 1,655 dunams were for plantations and irrigable land, 32,310 for cereals, while a total of 210 dunams were built-up land.

=== Occupation by Israel ===
At the onset of the 1948 Arab-Israeli War Lubya was being defended by local militia volunteers. Village forces constantly skirmished with the Jewish militias which would soon become the Israeli Army; the first Israeli raid on the village occurred on January 20, 1948, coordinated with one on nearby Tur'an, leaving one Lubya resident dead. On February 24, local militiamen and Arab Liberation Army (ALA) members ambushed a Jewish convoy on the village's outskirts, causing several casualties, including one militiaman. The attack signaled that the Israelis were unable to keep the roads open and that foreign volunteers (the ALA) were taking over the offensive in the eastern Galilee.

In early March, Israeli forces attempted to create a route between Tiberias and the village of Shajara, which required attacking Lubya. During the attack militiamen repulsed the Israelis, killing seven and losing six of their own.

After Tiberias was occupied by Israel, Lubya turned to the ALA in nearby Nazareth for military support and guidance.

In early June, the 14th. battalion from the Golani Brigade was ordered to take Lubya and "to expel its inhabitants". However, the attack failed, due to heavy resistance from the villagers.

The ALA attacked the Jewish town of Sejera on June 10 at the time when a truce was being brokered between Lubya's militiamen and Israeli forces. After the truce expired on July 16, Israel launched Operation Dekel, capturing Nazareth at the start.

After news of Nazareth's fall, the majority of non-combatant village residents fled north towards Lebanon or to nearby Arab towns. The ALA also withdrew, leaving the local militia to confront incoming forces. When a single Israeli armored unit appeared outside the village, the militia retreated and left the village. The few remaining residents reported that Israeli forces subsequently shelled Lubya, demolished a few houses and commandeered many others. The village was finally demolished in the 1960s.

The Israeli town of Lavi was built on Lubya's land, northeast of the village site. There are also two parks on the village lands: the Lavi Pine Forest and the South African Park. They are used as picnic grounds for local residents, including former residents of Lubya who are internally displaced persons living in various existing Arab localities in Israel.

In the 1990s, two books were published about Lubya by Ibrahim Yahya Al-Shahabi, one under the auspices of Birzeit University, and one book about Lubya was published in Denmark, in 1995, by Mahmoud Issa.

== Demographics ==
The village's population rose and dropped dramatically throughout its history; In 1596, Lubya had a population of 1,177 dropping to about 400–700 in the beginning of the 19th century.

The village's residents predominantly adhered to Islam. It was estimated that there was 16,741 Palestinian refugees descending from Lubya in 1998. After 1948, the majority of refugees lived at the Wavel refugee camp in Lebanon and other places in Lebanon, Jordan and Syria. A few hundred remained in Israel as present absentees, living first in Kafr Kana. After the departure of the PLO from Lebanon in 1983 and the Sabra and Shatila massacres, many Lubya refugees emigrated from Lebanon to Europe. By 2003 about 2,000 lived in Denmark, Sweden and Germany.

== See also ==
- Depopulated Palestinian locations in Israel

== Bibliography ==
- Al-Shahabi, Ibrahim Yahya (1994a). Lubya: Shawka fi hasirat al-mashuru al-sahyuni [Lubya: a thorn in the side of the Zionist project]. Damascus, Syria: Dar el-Shajara.
- Al-Shahabi, Ibrahim Yahya (1994b). Qaryat Lubya [Lubya village]. Birzeit, West Bank: Birzeit University, CRDPS.
- Barron, J. B., ed. (1923). Palestine: Report and General Abstracts of the Census of 1922. Government of Palestine.
- Buckingham, J.S (1821). Travels in Palestine Through the Countries of Bashan and Gilead, East of the River Jordan, Including a Visit to the Cities of Geraza and Gamala in the Decapolis. London: Longman.
- Burckhardt, J.L. (1822). Travels in Syria and the Holy Land. J. Murray.
- Conder, C.R.; Kitchener, H. H. (1881). The Survey of Western Palestine: Memoirs of the Topography, Orography, Hydrography, and Archaeology. Vol. 1. London: Committee of the Palestine Exploration Fund.
- Davis, U. (2003). Apartheid Israel: Possibilities for the Struggle Within. Zed Books. ISBN 1-84277-339-9.
- Davis, Rochelle A. (2011). Palestinian Village Histories: Geographies of the Displaced. Stanford University Press, Stanford, California. ISBN 978-0-8047-7312-6.
- Department of Statistics (1945). Village Statistics, April, 1945. Government of Palestine.
- Guérin, V. (1880). Description Géographique Historique et Archéologique de la Palestine (in French). Vol. 3: Galilee, pt. 1. Paris: L'Imprimerie Nationale.
- Hadawi, S. (1970). Village Statistics of 1945: A Classification of Land and Area ownership in Palestine. Palestine Liberation Organization Research Center.
- Hanna, Butrus (2009-01-09). "Khirbat Lubiya Final Report". Hadashot Arkheologiyot – Excavations and Surveys in Israel (121).
- Hanna, Butrus (2012-08-22). "Khirbat Lubiya, Golany Interchange". Hadashot Arkheologiyot – Excavations and Surveys in Israel (124).
- Hütteroth, W.-D.; Abdulfattah, K. (1977). Historical Geography of Palestine, Transjordan and Southern Syria in the Late 16th Century. Erlanger Geographische Arbeiten, Sonderband 5. Erlangen, Germany: Vorstand der Fränkischen Geographischen Gesellschaft. ISBN 3-920405-41-2.
- Issa, Mahmoud (1995). Palestinians from Lubya in Denmark: Dreams and Realities. Danish Refugee Council, the Documentation Centre.
- Karmon, Y. (1960). "An Analysis of Jacotin's Map of Palestine" (PDF). Israel Exploration Journal. 10 (3, 4): 155–173, 244–253. Archived from the original (PDF) on 2019-12-22.
- Khalidi, W. (1992). All That Remains: The Palestinian Villages Occupied and Depopulated by Israel in 1948. Washington D.C.: Institute for Palestine Studies. ISBN 0-88728-224-5.
- Mills, E., ed. (1932). Census of Palestine 1931. Population of Villages, Towns and Administrative Areas. Jerusalem: Government of Palestine.
- Morris, B. (2004). The Birth of the Palestinian Refugee Problem Revisited. Cambridge University Press. ISBN 978-0-521-00967-6.
- Nazzal, Nafez (1978). The Palestinian Exodus from Galilee 1948. Beirut: The Institute for Palestine Studies. ISBN 9780887281280.
- Palmer, E.H. (1881). The Survey of Western Palestine: Arabic and English Name Lists Collected During the Survey by Lieutenants Conder and Kitchener, R. E. Transliterated and Explained by E.H. Palmer. Committee of the Palestine Exploration Fund.
- Pappé, I. (2006). The Ethnic Cleansing of Palestine. London and New York: Oneworld. ISBN 1-85168-467-0.
- Petersen, Andrew (2001). A Gazetteer of Buildings in Muslim Palestine: Volume I (British Academy Monographs in Archaeology). Oxford University Press. ISBN 0-19-727011-5. (pp. 202–203)
- Pringle, D. (1997). Secular buildings in the Crusader Kingdom of Jerusalem: an archaeological Gazetter. Cambridge University Press. ISBN 0521-46010-7. (p. 119)
- Reston, J. Jr. (2007). Warriors of God: Richard the Lionheart and Saladin in the Third Crusade. Knopf Doubleday Publishing Group. ISBN 978-0307430120.
- Rhode, H. (1979). Administration and Population of the Sancak of Safed in the Sixteenth Century (PhD). Columbia University. Archived from the original on 2020-03-01.
- Robinson, E.; Smith, E. (1841). Biblical Researches in Palestine, Mount Sinai and Arabia Petraea: A Journal of Travels in the year 1838. Vol. 3. Boston: Crocker & Brewster.
- Röhricht, R. (1893). Regista Regni Hierosolymitani (1097-1291). Oeniponti : Libraria Academica Wagneriana. (pp. 6, 326)
- Schumacher, G. (1888). "Population list of the Liwa of Akka". Quarterly Statement - Palestine Exploration Fund. 20: 169–191.
- Twain, M. (1869). The innocents abroad.
- Tal, D. (2004). War in Palestine, 1948. Routledge. ISBN 0-7146-5275-X.
