= Məsəd =

- Municipality
- Location within Azerbaijan
- Coordinates: 40°38′52″N 47°29′36″E
- Country: Azerbaijan
- Rayon: Agdash

Population
  - Total: 1,382
- Time zone: UTC+4 (AZT)
  - Summer (DST): UTC+5 (AZT)

Məsəd (also, Maşad and Məşəd) is a village and municipality in the Agdash Rayon of Azerbaijan. It has a population of 1,382. The municipality consists of the villages of Məsəd and Gürcüva.
