= Masad, Israel =

Masad: מסד (Hebrew)
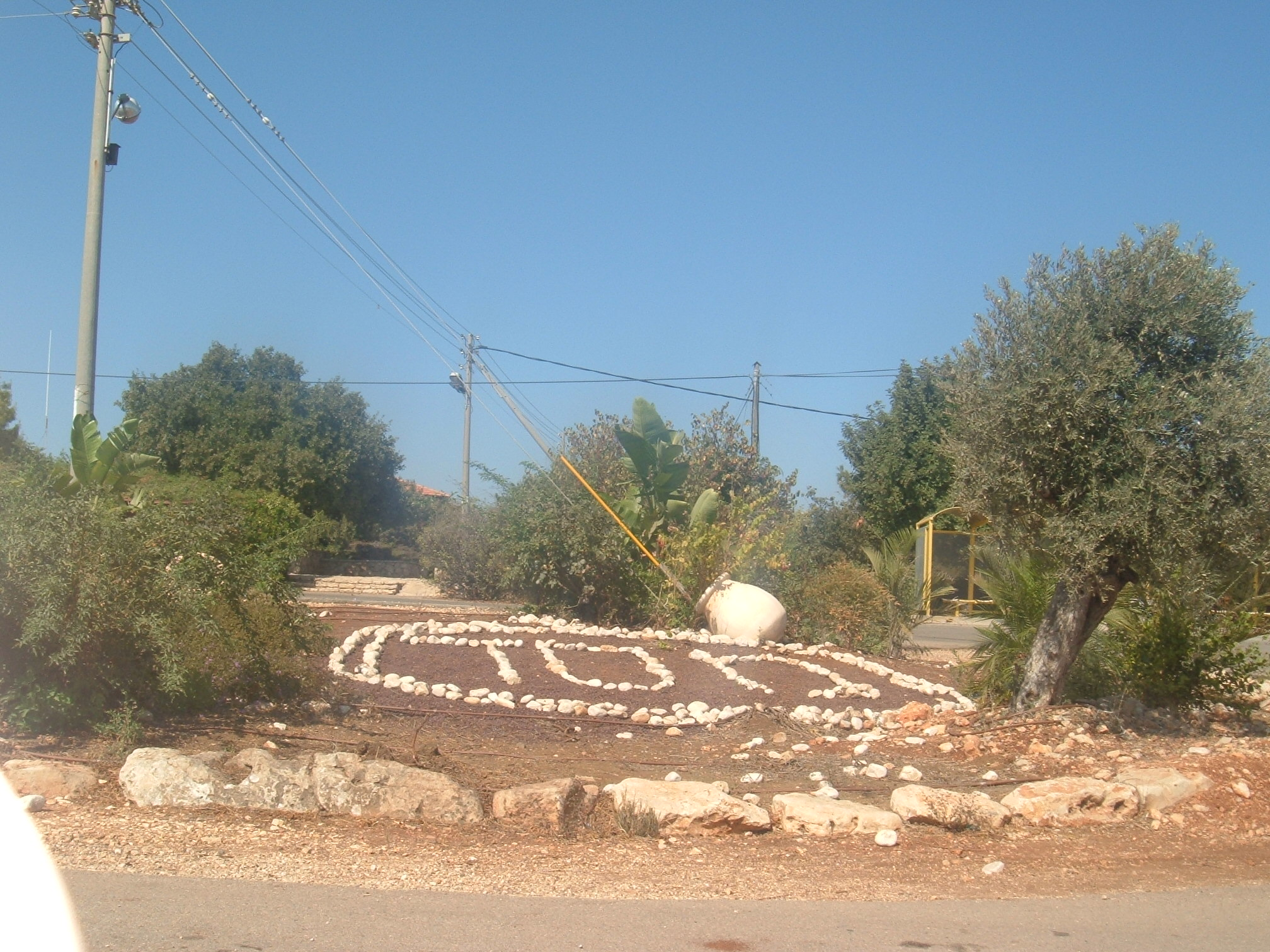

- Location within Northeast Israel
- Coordinates: 32°50′38″N 35°25′22″E
- Country: Israel
- District: Northern
- Subdistrict: Kinneret
- Council: Lower Galilee
- Affiliation: HaMerkaz HaHakla'i
- Founded: 1983
- Population (2024): 379
- Website: www.massad.org.il

Masad (Hebrew: מַסָּד, lit. foundation) is a community settlement in northern Israel. Located to the west of the Sea of Galilee, it falls under the jurisdiction of Lower Galilee Regional Council. In 2024 it had a population of 379.

== Name ==
Har Kotz: Mount Qotz (292 m), named for a priestly family that migrated to the Galilee from Jerusalem after the destruction of the Second Temple. See Hakkoz priestly family, who migrated to Eilabun.

Masad: 'foundation', taken from the description of Salomon's palace in 1 Kings 7:9: "All these structures ... from foundation (masad) to eaves were made of high-grade-stone."

== History ==
The village was founded as Har Kotz in 1983 and later named after a biblical verse, dealing with the building of Solomon's palace.

Plans to build a quarry on Mount Kotz were rejected by the National Planning and Construction Council in 2008 after protests staged by the residents of Masad and the nearby Arab village of Eilabun.

2km to the northeast is Hurvat Mimlah (also Khirbet Mimla, PAL 191/251), the site of the ancient village of Mamliah (Hebrew: ממליח), seat of the Hezir priestly family following the destruction of the Temple in 70 CE. Today it is a ruin.

== Nature reserve ==
Masad is surrounded by the Har Kotz Nature Reserve. Among the trees found there are carob, mastic, Mount Tabor oak, Christ's Thorn, Palestine oak, and Jerusalem thorn. The nature reserve derives its name from Mount Qotz (292 m), itself named after a priestly family that lived nearby.

== See also ==
- Nature reserves in Israel
