= Lavi =

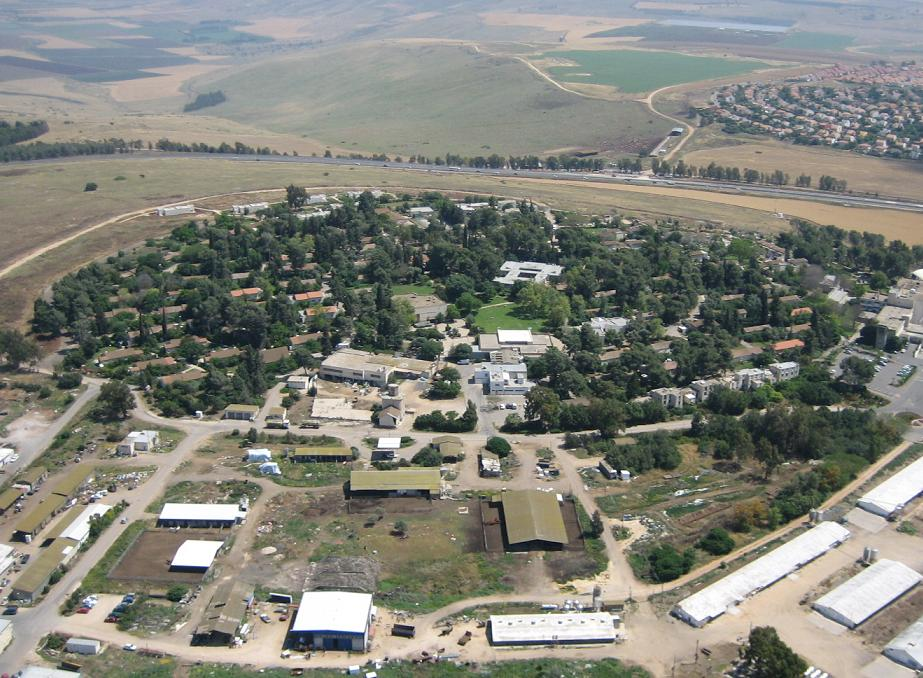

- Location within Northeast Israel
- Coordinates: 32°47′14″N 35°26′30″E
- Country: Israel
- District: Northern
- Subdistrict: Kinneret
- Council: Lower Galilee
- Affiliation: Religious Kibbutz Movement
- Founded: 1949
- Founder: British Orthodox Jews
- Population (2024): 659
- Website: http://www.lavi.co.il/

Lavi (Hebrew: לָבִיא, lit. Lion) is a kibbutz in northern Israel. Located 310 meters above sea level and 10 minutes from Tiberias, it falls under the jurisdiction of Lower Galilee Regional Council. In 2024 it had a population of 659.

== History ==
=== Founding ===
Kibbutz Lavi was founded at the location of the Arab village of Lubya, depopulated during the 1948 war by Haganah soldiers. Two young children were shot by Haganah soldiers in Lubya, before the founding of the State of Israel.

The source of the name "Lavi" and "Lubia" is from the ancient Lavi village which existed in the days of the Mishnah and Talmud, in which there was an inn called "Lavi", on the way from Tiberias to Sepphoris.

The kibbutz was founded in 1949 by young religious immigrants from the United Kingdom, who were from the British branch of Bnei Akiva, a religious Zionist youth movement. Many of the founders were among the 10,000 Jewish children who were taken to the United Kingdom from Germany as part of the 1938-1940 Kindertransport program following Kristallnacht. In its early years, the Bachad movement raised money in the UK for the kibbutz as well as providing agricultural and educational training for Bnei Akiva and Bachad members in the UK on Thaxted Farm, Essex. Lavi was the first kibbutz where children lived with their parents, instead of in communal children's quarters where the children of other kibbutzim were housed and fed.

Among the founders of the kibbutz was Yehuda Avner, a British immigrant who became a diplomat and advisor to several Israeli prime ministers. The first couple to be married on the kibbutz, founders Michael and Marion Mittwoch, celebrated the birth of their 100th great-grandchild in January 2015. In the mid-1970s Rabbi Shlomo Aviner was the Rabbi at Lavi, before he moved on to Keshet in the Golan Heights.

=== Population ===
In 2005, 770 people lived in the kibbutz.

Since 2003 a program in Lavi has been open for children at the Jewish Free School in London, England. The same opportunity was also opened for the King David School. The group stays in the kibbutz for 9 weeks, while attending the nearby school and touring the country.

== Economy ==
The kibbutz's main income sources are agriculture, Lavi furniture Industries, a 55-year-old carpentry workshop which manufactures furniture for synagogues around the world, a hotel with facilities suitable for Orthodox Jews as well as other guests and Kibbutz members who work outside, whose salaries are paid to the kibbutz.

The village has a religious elementary state school, which also serves other villages in the Regional Council. The children of junior high and high school age study at the "Shaked" school in Sde Eliyahu. There is a religious boarding school called "Hodayot" next to the kibbutz.

Because of Lavi's central location in the Lower Galilee, many tourist sites are within walking distance or less than 45 minutes away by car: The Lavi forest, The Horns of Hittin, Nabi Shu'ayb which is regarded by the Druze to be the burial site of the biblical Jethro, The Tzipori National Park, and Safed are a few well-known examples.
