= Beit Rimon =

Kibbutz in northern Israel

Beit Rimon: בית רימון (Hebrew)
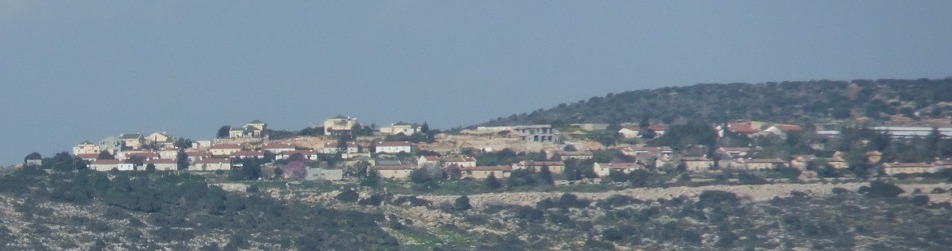

- Location within Jezreel Valley region of Israel Location within Israel
- Coordinates: 32°46′55″N 35°19′47″E
- Country: Israel
- District: Northern
- Subdistrict: Jezreel
- Council: Lower Galilee
- Affiliation: Religious Kibbutz Movement
- Founded: 1977
- Founder: Nahal
- Population (2024): 1,229
- Website: www.bet-rimon.co.il

Beit Rimon (Hebrew: בֵּית רִמּוֹן, lit. House of the Pomegranate) is a kibbutz located in the Lower Galilee Regional Council in Israel. It consists of a core kibbutz and a residential expansion. It is located in the Lower Galilee on a ridge of Mount Tur'an at a height of 400 meters above sea level. As of 2024 it had a population of 1,229.

== Etymology ==
It is named after the Biblical Rimon (pomegranate in Hebrew) in the lands of the Tribe of Zebulun (Joshua 19:13), which "is identified with er-Rumane" at today's Arab village of Rumana, 2 km to the west.

== History ==
Beit Rimon was first settled in 1977 as a Nahal settlement. In 1979, a group of British immigrants joined the Nahal group and established a kibbutz at the site, affiliated with the Religious Kibbutz Movement.

The kibbutz operates one of the largest dairy farms in the country, a chicken coop and a factory for agricultural and gardening tools. It also cultivates olives and field crops.
