= HaZor'im =

HaZor'im: הַזּוֹרְעִים (Hebrew)
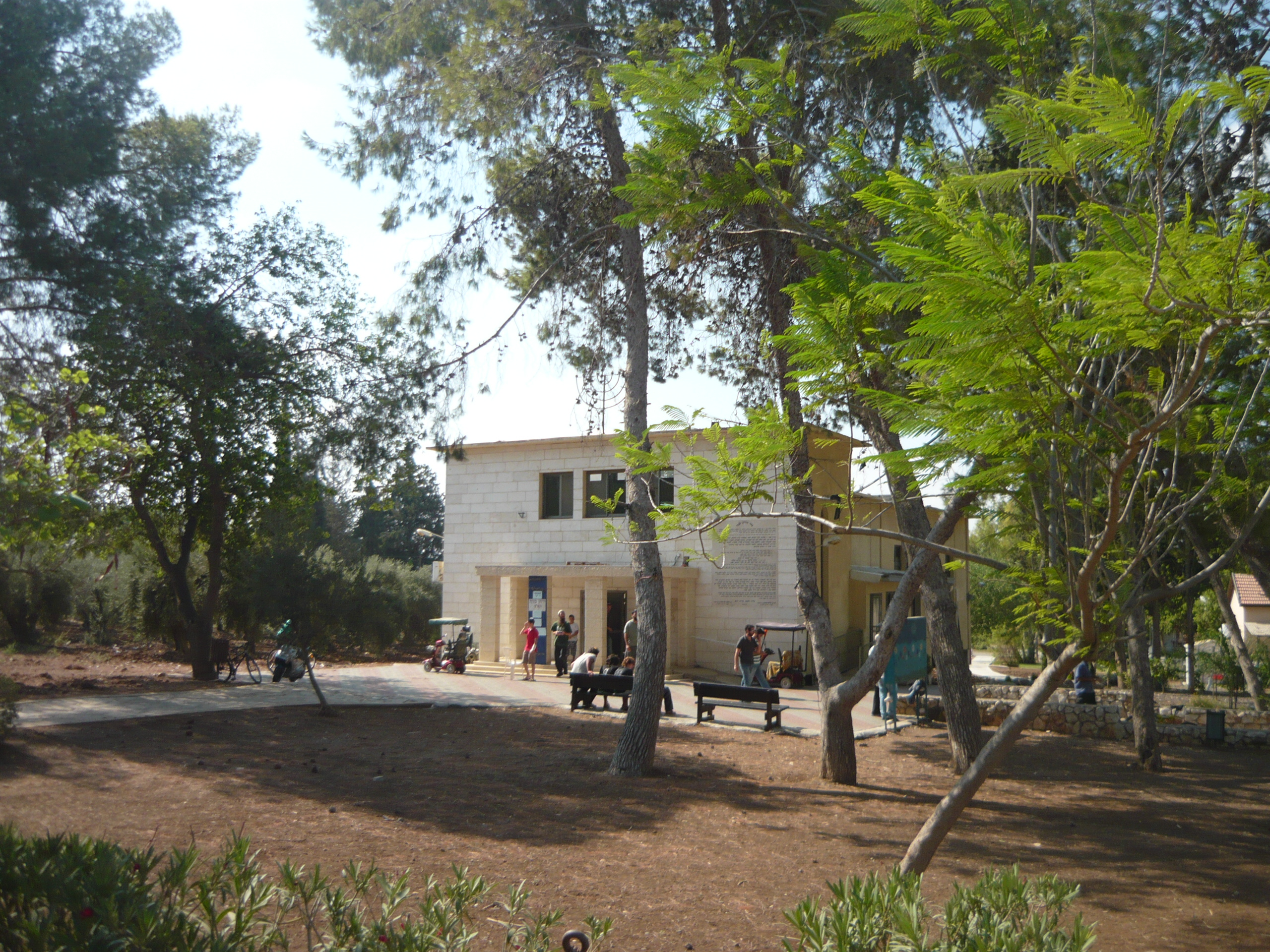
- HaZor'im synagogue

- Location within Northeast Israel
- Coordinates: 32°44′47″N 35°30′4″E
- Country: Israel
- District: Northern
- Subdistrict: Kinneret
- Council: Lower Galilee
- Affiliation: Hapoel HaMizrachi
- Founded: 1939
- Founder: Union of Religious Pioneers; Ezra youth movement Mizrahi Youth
- Population (2024): 1,202

HaZor'im (Hebrew: הַזּוֹרְעִים) is a religious moshav in northern Israel. Located three kilometres south-west of Tiberias, it falls under the jurisdiction of Lower Galilee Regional Council. In 2024 it had a population of 1,202.

Within the moshav's territory and nearby lie the remains of Sirgona, Tzaydata, Atush, and Damin. To the east of the moshav runs the Poriya Ridge, and to its west lie the Yavne'el Valley, Yavne'el Stream, Admi Stream, the Admi Ridge Nature Reserve, and the communities of Yavne'el and Sharona.

== History ==
The village was established on 23 May 1939 in the Tower and Stockade settlement method, by Jewish immigrants from Europe, mostly from Germany and the Netherlands, joined after a while by immigrants from North Africa. The founders belonged to the Union of Religious Pioneers, the Ezra youth movement and the Mizrahi Youth.
