= Ofer Winter =

IDF general

- עופר וינטר
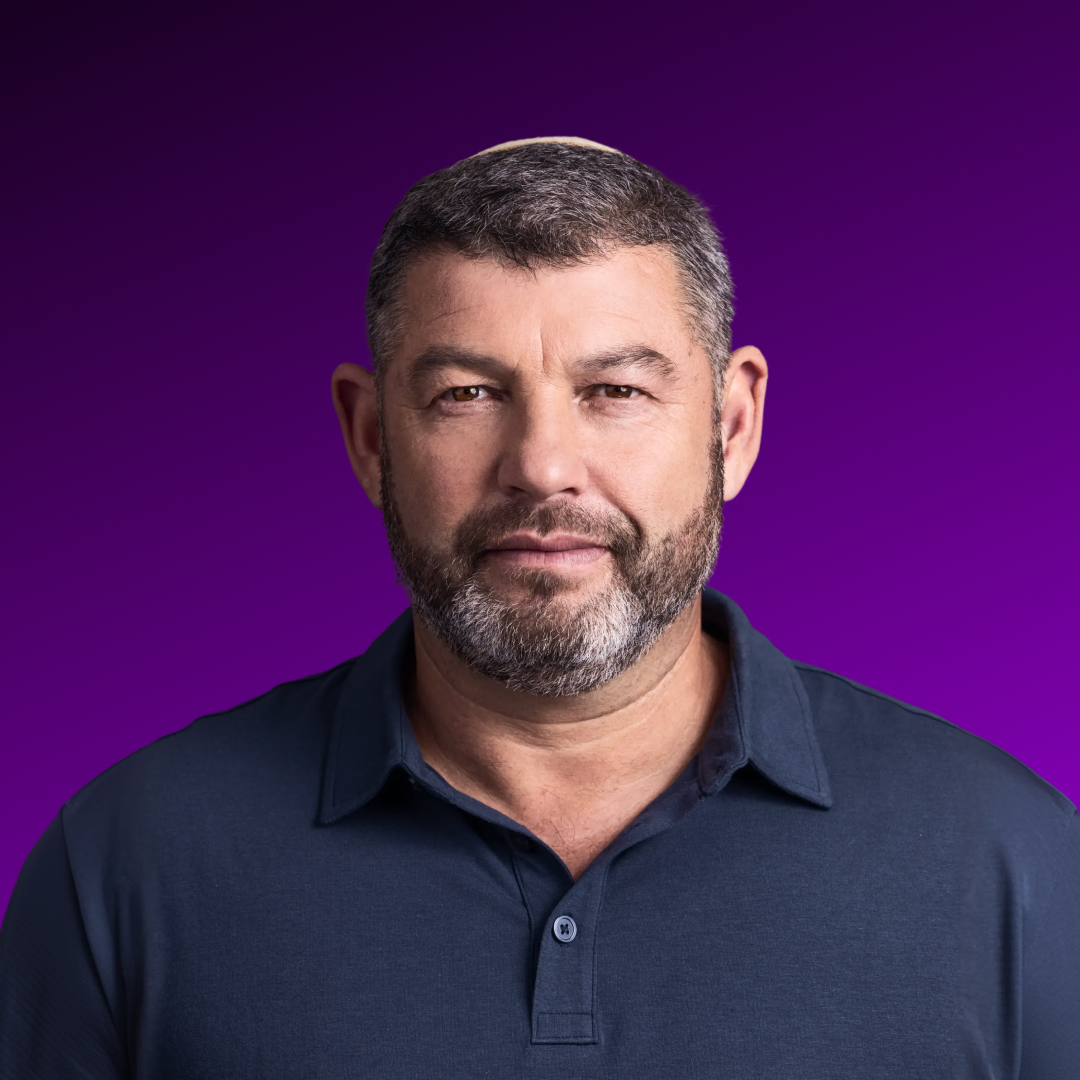
- Winter in 2026

Personal details
- Born: 3 February 1971 (age 55) Rekhasim, Israel
- Party: Amcha Yisrael
- Spouse: Revital Winter
- Children: 8
- Education: Bnei David Mechina; National Security College
- Alma mater: University of Haifa; Bar-Ilan University; Hebrew University of Jerusalem

Military service
- Allegiance: Israel
- Branch/service: Armed forces
- Years of service: 1990–2024
- Rank: Brigadier general
- Commands: 98th Paratroopers Division; Central Command; Givati Brigade; Duvdevan Unit
- Battles/wars: South Lebanon conflict (1985–2000); Second Intifada; 2006 Lebanon War; Operation Cast Lead; Operation Pillar of Defense; Operation Protective Edge; Operation Guardian of the Walls; Gaza war

Ofer Winter (Hebrew: עופר וינטר; born 3 February 1971) is a retired Israel Defense Forces Brigadier General who has served in the reserves since 2024 and is also the founder of Amcha Yisrael. He served as the commander of 98th Paratroopers Division, the military secretary to the Israeli Minister of Defense, the Chief of Staff of Central Command, the commander of the Givati Brigade, the commander of the Northern Brigade in the Gaza Strip, the commander of the 646 Brigade, the commander of the Duvdevan Unit, and the commander of the Givati Reconnaissance Battalion.

== Early life and education ==
Winter was born in Rekhasim and grew up in Kiryat Ata. He is the eldest of four siblings. His family is of Hungarian-Jewish origin. According to him, he received his combat heritage from his father David (Dutzo), who during the Yom Kippur War was a soldier in the 113th Armored Battalion and fought on both sides of the Suez Canal for 19 consecutive days.

From 1985 to 1989, he studied at the Or Etzion Military Boarding School for Command, and continued at the Bnei David pre-military academy in Eli in the second cohort.

== Military career ==
He enlisted in the IDF in November 1990 and volunteered for the Sayeret Matkal special forces unit. He underwent training as a fighter in the unit. After the infantry officers course he was a team commander in the Maglan special forces unit, which he joined following his commander Tal Russo. He was later appointed commander of a combat platoon in Maglan. Within the unit, he participated in dozens of operations, including Operation Grapes of Wrath in 1996. He later served in the Givati Brigade and was appointed commander of the spearhead company in the Tzabar Battalion. He was then appointed commander of the Givati Reconnaissance Company from 2000 to 2002 and led it in many operations in the Gaza Strip.

In 2003, he was promoted to the rank of lieutenant colonel and appointed commander of the Givati Reconnaissance Battalion, serving in the position until 2005. He led the battalion in fighting against Palestinian militancy during the Second Intifada in the Gaza Strip. For his actions in a series of operations deep in the Gaza Strip, the battalion under his command was awarded a unit citation on 22 April 2004, by the Southern Command commander, Dan Harel. In May 2004, the battalion suffered six casualties in the first APC disaster, in which a Givati engineering APC was destroyed. For the series of actions carried out by the reconnaissance battalion under his command, the battalion was awarded the Medal of Valor on 14 April 2005.

He later served as the IDF attaché to the Marines from 2005 to 2007. In 2007, he was appointed commander of the Duvdevan Unit. At his initiative, the unit participated for the first time in fighting in the Gaza Strip during the 2008–2009 Operation Cast Lead. During his command, the unit won the Chief of Staff's Award for Outstanding Units for operational activity. He completed his role in November 2009. In December 2009, he was promoted to the rank of colonel and appointed commander of the 35th Paratroopers Brigade's reserve 646th Brigade, the "Marom Foxes" (Shu'alei Marom), completing his role in May 2011. On 18 May 2011, he was appointed commander of the Northern Brigade in the Gaza Strip, a position he held until 21 July 2013.

=== Givati Brigade commander ===
On 22 August 2013, he was appointed commander of the Givati Brigade and led the brigade, among other things, during Operation Protective Edge. At the beginning of the operation, on 9 July 2014, a "Commander's Page for Battle" he wrote to the brigade's soldiers was published, in which, in addition to messages such as emphasizing mission accomplishment and defending the people and the homeland, he wrote:

"History has chosen us to be at the forefront of the fight against the fierce Gazan terrorist enemy, who defies, curses, and reviles the God of Israel's armies. I lift my eyes to the heavens and call with you, "Shma Yīsrāʾēl Hashem ʾElokeinu Hashemʾ eḥād" O Lord, God of Israel, please make our path successful, as we go and stand to fight for Your people Israel against the enemy who blasphemes Your name."

The commander's page was published in the media and sparked a discussion about the place of religion and faith in the army.

During the operation, the brigade's fighters under his command killed many militants and uncovered and destroyed combat tunnels and infrastructure used by Hamas. The brigade played a central role in the Battle of Rafah. In a lecture he gave in 2021, he said he opposed the action that started the battle, as he believed the risk outweighed its benefit, but the Southern Command commander, Sami Turgeman, held a situation assessment and decided to carry it out.

In January 2015, following the dismissal of the Tzabar Battalion commander on suspicion of sexual harassment, the Chief of Staff, Benny Gantz, decided to issue him a command note, stating that "in this event, it was necessary to act according to the procedures and orders and to be familiar with them alongside the command handling." However, Gantz emphasized that his involvement in the event was "professional, ethical, and sharp."

On 29 April 2015, he received the MAFAT Award for Creative Thinking. The award was given to him, a team from MAFAT-Ministry of Defense, Shayetet 13, and the companies Rafael and Artemis for the "Snake Pit" project – a system that combines several technologies to deal with the underground threat, which was integrated during Operation Protective Edge and proved to have significant operational contribution.

On 21 June 2015, he completed his role. He then attended the National Security College in the 43rd cohort (2015–2016).

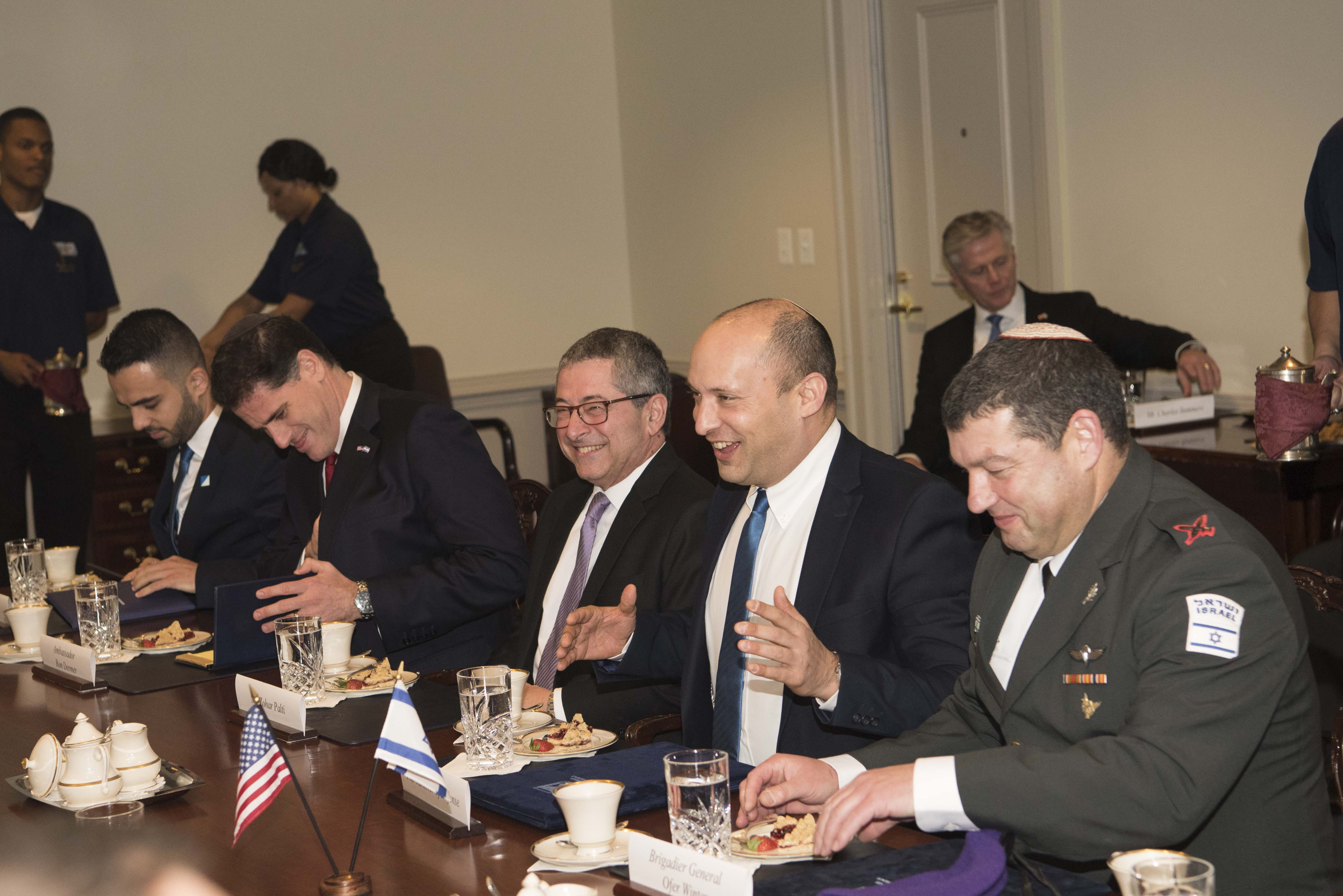
Winter as the Defense Minister's Military Secretary, Defense Minister Naftali Bennett, Defense Ministry official Zohar Pelti and Israel's Ambassador to the United States Ron Dermer at a meeting at the Pentagon in the United States, February 2020

=== Brigadier General roles ===
On 13 July 2016, he was promoted to the rank of brigadier general and appointed Chief of Staff of the Central Command, a position he held until September 2018. On 11 October 2018, he was appointed Military Secretary to the Minister of Defense. During his tenure, he served under Defense Ministers Avigdor Lieberman, Benjamin Netanyahu, Naftali Bennett, and Benny Gantz. He served in this role until 2 July 2020. On 9 August 2020, he was appointed commander of the Fire Formation. On 9 June 2021, the Chief of Staff, Aviv Kohavi, reprimanded him for a conversation he had with Knesset member Naftali Bennett without approval and without reporting it to his superiors, contrary to IDF regulations prohibiting direct contact between servicemen and elected officials. He completed his role in the Fire Formation on 21 September 2022, and went to study at Reichman University.

Winter was passed over for promotion in May 2023.

In 2023, on the morning of 7 October attack, upon receiving the first reports of the surprise attack by the Hamas organization, he arrived on his own initiative at the front, joined the fighters in the Be'eri area, and participated in a battle in which 11 militants were killed.

On 8 May 2024, the Chief of Staff, Herzi Halevi, informed Winter of the end of his service in the IDF.

== Political career ==
Winter was offered a reserved slot on the Likud list, which he declined.

Winter announced in mid-August that he would launch a new political party at an event at SHALVA Center in Jerusalem on 25 August, ahead of the 2026 Israeli legislative election, after advertising its launch in billboards along Ayalon Highway and online. He published a video that called for mass emigration from Gaza as a solution for the enclave, a topic which was also brought up during the launch of the party, which is named Amcha Yisrael. The party list includes Arab-Israeli advocacy activist Yoseph Haddad, former Jerusalem deputy mayor Fleur Hassan-Nahoum, and the economist Ronen Bondero.

== Personal life ==
Winter resides in Mitzpe Netofa, is married to Revital, and is the father of eight children. One of his daughters is married to the son of Ofek Buchris.
