= Amcha Yisrael =

Amcha Yisrael עמך ישראל
- Leader: Ofer Winter
- Founded: 25 August 2026; 2 months ago
- Ideology: Zionism; National conservatism
- Political position: Right-wing
- Colours: Blue; Purple
- Slogan: Winter is coming
- Knesset: 0 / 120

Election symbol
- ך خ

Website
- amchaisrael.co.il

Amcha Yisrael (Hebrew: עמך ישראל, Arabic: شعبك إسرائيل, lit. 'Your People Israel'), translated as People of Israel, is an Israeli right-wing political party led by retired Israel Defense Forces brigadier general Ofer Winter. The party was officially launched on 25 August 2026, ahead of the 2026 Israeli legislative election. It did not pass the 3.25% electoral threshold and was left out of the Knesset after winning 1.7% of the vote.

== History ==
In July 2026, a Kan 11 poll about leadership of a new right-wing party showed former IDF brigadier general Ofer Winter with the highest support, at 36 per cent, followed by 13 per cent for Gilad Erdan, seven per cent for Ayelet Shaked, and six per cent for Yuli Edelstein. It was reported on 19 August that Yoseph Haddad was in talks with Winter to "join forces". Winter announced the following day that he would launch a new political party on 25 August, which he launched in Jerusalem.

An early September poll by i24 News found Winter's party dropping by three seats, from eight to five, compared to the previous poll by the same organization, following the alliance between the Religious Zionist Party and Zehut. A Zman Yisrael poll, published on 3 September, resulted in Amcha Yisrael being below the electoral threshold. Throughout September and October, the party's support fluctuated near the electoral threshold, occasionally dropping below it.

Amcha Israel offered to merge in September with the Haredi Public party, which Haredi declined.

The party submitted its list to the Central Elections Committee on 7 September 2026.

The Reservists-New Economic Party alliance called on Amcha Yisrael in October to sign a surplus voter agreement and break with the pro-Netanyahu bloc; Amcha Yisrael was unresponsive.

Davidi Ben Zion, who was ranked eighth on the party's slate, announced on 13 October that he was leaving the party.

Winter sought a surplus voter agreement with Itamar Ben-Gvir and his Otzma Yehudit party on 13 October, shortly before the 16 October deadline for agreements, but Ben-Gvir sharply refused.

The party was below the 3.25% electoral threshold in the election, winning 1.7% of the vote. Winter stated after the election that "We made mistakes, I made mistakes, and I am not running away from that responsibility."

== Platform ==
Winter has described Amcha Yisrael as part of Israel's right-wing political camp, and said that it would seek to participate in a broad right-wing government with "Zionist partners".

Winter said on 27 August that he would only recommend Benjamin Netanyahu as prime minister following the election, and that the party would support the "voluntary emigration" of residents from Gaza and Haredi conscription into the IDF.

Winter stipulated that the party's support of a Netanyahu government would rely on the passage of a Haredi draft law before the formation of a government.

== Electoral list ==
Its initial candidate list includes Arab-Israeli activist Yoseph Haddad, journalist Netali Shem-Tov, former Jerusalem deputy mayor Fleur Hassan-Nahoum, military reservists, public activists, and relatives of Israelis killed during the 2023 Hamas-led attack on Israel and the subsequent war.

Unlike Otzma Yehudit and the Religious Zionist Party, Amcha Yisrael is considered a more "inclusive" right-wing party that includes broader sections of Israeli society.

== Election results ==
=== Knesset ===
Election	Leader	Votes	%	Seats	+/−	Government
2026	Ofer Winter	95,764	1.68% (#13)	0 / 120	New	Extra-parliamentary
