= Tur'an =

Arab town in northern Israel

Tur'an: טורעאן, תֻּרְעָן; طرعان
- Local council (from 1959)

Hebrew transcription(s)
  - ISO 259: Ṭurˁan, Turˁan
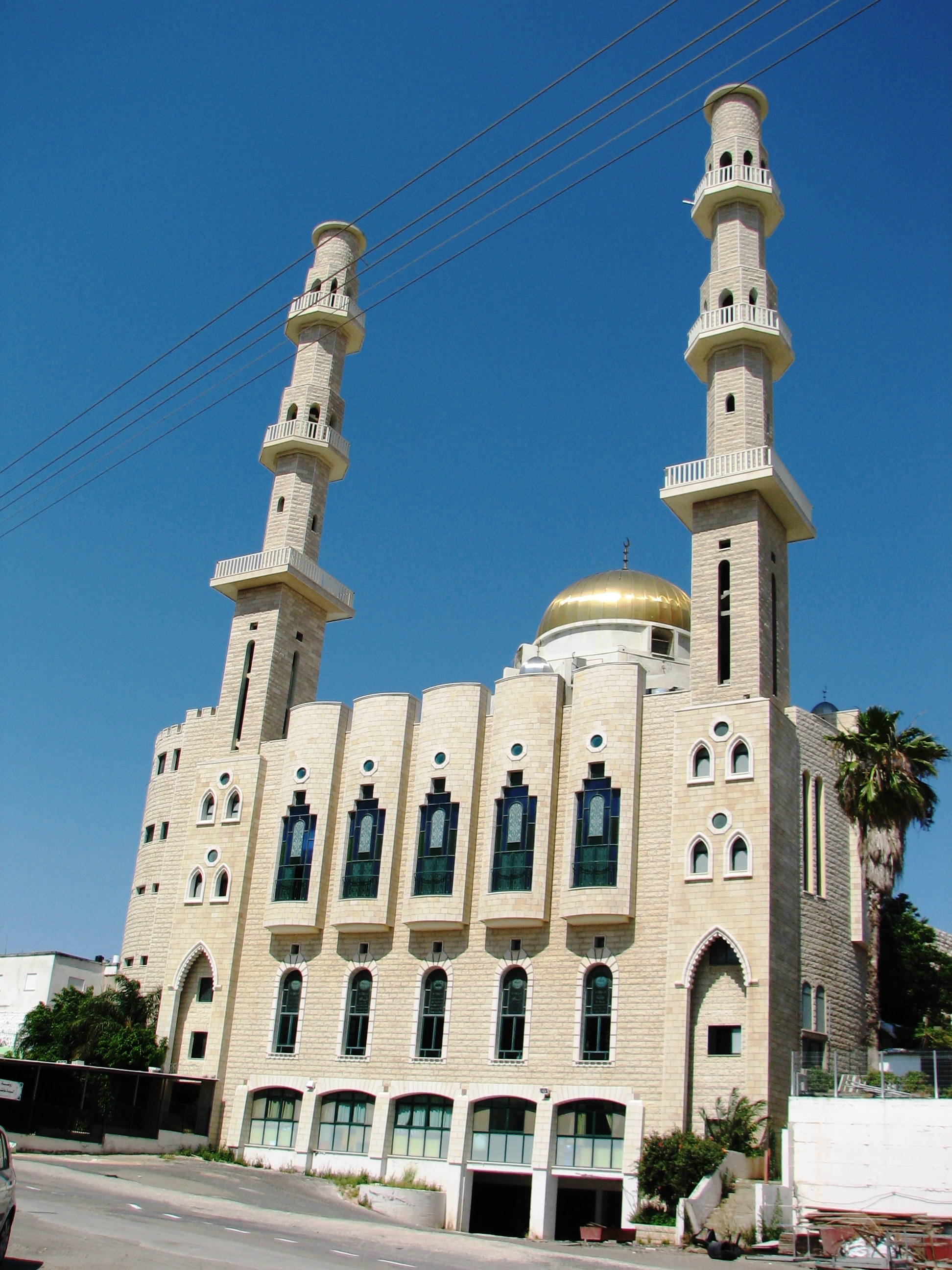
- Abu Baker Sadic Mosque, Tur'an, 2011

- Location within Jezreel Valley region of Israel
- Coordinates: 32°46′37″N 35°22′33″E
- Grid position: 185/242 PAL
- Country: Israel
- District: Northern
- Subdistrict: Jezreel
- Natural Region: Nazareth-Tir'an Mountains

Population (2024)
  - Total: 14,931
- Name meaning: Possibly from "an outlet of water", Syriac form

Tur'an (Arabic: طرعان, Hebrew: תֻּרְעָן) is an Arab local council in the Northern District of Israel. It is located at the foot of Mount Tur'an and the Tur'an Valley, near the main road from Haifa to Tiberias, and about 17 kilometres (11 mi) north of Nazareth. In 2024 it had a population of 14,931, most of whom are Israeli Arabs.

== History ==
=== Iron Age ===
Pottery and building remains from the Iron Age I have been excavated in the northwestern part of the village. Apparently Tur'an was at that time (10–9th centuries BCE) surrounded by a city wall. Apparently it was of a considerable size in the late tenth to the mid-ninth centuries BCE. The massive wall, (width c. 2.4 m), probably enclosed an area of about 25 dunams, and has frm pottery remains been dated to Iron Age IIA (ninth century BCE).

The PEF's Survey of Western Palestine (SWP) found caves and rock-cut cisterns in the village, which they noted appeared to be an ancient site.

=== Classical Antiquity and Middle Ages ===
The village was known in the Roman and Byzantine periods (Mishnaic and Talmudic times, respectively) as Tir'an. It was a Jewish village.

Pottery from the early Islamic (7th century CE), and Mamluk (14th century CE) have been excavated in the village centre, near the old mosque, together with building remains from the same period.

=== Ottoman era ===
In 1517, Tur'an was with the rest of Palestine incorporated into the Ottoman Empire after it was captured from the Mamluks, and by 1596, it appeared in the Ottoman tax registers as being in the nahiya of Tabariyya, part of Sanjak Safad. It had a population of 48 households, all Muslim. They paid a fixed tax rate of 25% on agricultural products, including wheat, barley, olive trees, fruit trees, goats and/or beehives; a total of 5,410 akçe.

A map from Napoleon's invasion of 1799 by Pierre Jacotin showed the place, though misplaced, named as Touran.

In 1838, it was noted as a large Muslim, Catholic Christian and Greek Christian village in the Nazareth district.

In 1848, William F. Lynch described Tur'an as "quite a fortification." The French explorer Victor Guérin visited Tur'an in 1870, and estimated it had 350 Muslims and 200 "Greeks". In 1881, the PEF's Survey of Western Palestine (SWP) described it as "A stone village, partly built of basalt, containing about 300 inhabitants, half Christian, half Moslem.[..] The village is situated al the foot of the hills, and is surrounded by groves of olives. There is a good spring to the north-west."

A population list from about 1887 showed that Tor'an had about 600 inhabitants; mixed Christians and Muslims.

=== British Mandate era ===
In the 1922 census of Palestine conducted by the British Mandate authorities, Tur'an had a population of 768; 542 Muslims and 226 Christians. Of the Christians, 52 were Orthodox and 174 were Melkite. The population had increased in the 1931 census to 961; 693 Muslims and 268 Christians, in a total of 188 occupied houses.

In the 1945 statistics the population was 1,350; 1,010 Muslims and 340 Christians, with 29,743 dunams of land, according to an official land and population survey. Of this, 1,153 dunams were for plantations and irrigable land, 11,909 for cereals, while 34 dunams were built-up land.

=== State of Israel ===
On 18 July 1948 the Israeli captured Tur'an during the second part of Operation Dekel. The houses of those villagers who fled were later used to house Arab refugees from neighbouring villages.

According to a February 2026 investigation in Haaretz, a July 1948 order attributed to Yitzhak Broshi, commander of Battalion 12 in the Golani Brigade, instructed his forces to search for Arabs who had hidden in the area of Mount Tur'an in the Lower Galilee after the area was captured The order directed soldiers “to kill every person in hiding.”An additional order found in the same archive stated that “Arabs in small numbers are roaming the villages,” apparently in order to collect property and food. The directive instructed forces to “clean the area of Arabs.” Under the heading “The Method,” the document stated: “Every Arab encountered (sic) is to be destroyed.”

The village remained under Martial Law until 1966.

== Demographics ==
Historical population
Year	Pop.	±%
1972	3,800	—
1983	5,800	+52.6%
1995	7,900	+36.2%
2008	11,700	+48.1%
2022	14,397	+23.1%
2024	14,931	+3.7%

== Voting Patterns ==
In the 2022 election, 95 percent of voters in Tur'an voted for the Arab parties, while 3 percent voted for the parties of the center-left coalition led by Yair Lapid and 2 percent voted for the parties of the right-wing coalition led by Benjamin Netanyahu. Among the voters for the Arab parties, 49 percent voted for the Hadash–Ta'al list, while 32 percent voted for Ra'am and 19 percent voted for Balad.

In the 2026 election, 96 percent of voters in Tur'an voted for the Arab parties, while 4 percent voted for the parties of the center-left coalition led by Gadi Eisenkot and 0.3 percent voted for the parties of the right-wing coalition led by Benjamin Netanyahu. Among the voters for the Arab parties, 66 percent voted for the Joint List, while 34 percent voted for Ra'am. Voter turnout increased 83 percent from the 2022 election.

== See also ==
- Arab localities in Israel
- F.C. Tzeirei Tur'an

== Bibliography ==
- Barron, J.B., ed. (1923). Palestine: Report and General Abstracts of the Census of 1922. Government of Palestine.
- Cohen, Michael (2021-05-12). "Turʽan" (133). Hadashot Arkheologiyot – Excavations and Surveys in Israel.
- Conder, C.R.; Kitchener, H.H. (1881). The Survey of Western Palestine: Memoirs of the Topography, Orography, Hydrography, and Archaeology. Vol. 1. London: Committee of the Palestine Exploration Fund.
- Feig, Nurit (2016-12-29). "Turʽan, Northwest" (128). Hadashot Arkheologiyot – Excavations and Surveys in Israel.
- Government of Palestine, Department of Statistics (1945). Village Statistics, April, 1945.
- Guérin, V. (1880). Description Géographique Historique et Archéologique de la Palestine (in French). Vol. 3: Galilee, pt. 1. Paris: L'Imprimerie Nationale.
- Hadawi, S. (1970). Village Statistics of 1945: A Classification of Land and Area ownership in Palestine. Palestine Liberation Organization Research Center.
- Hütteroth, W.-D.; Abdulfattah, K. (1977). Historical Geography of Palestine, Transjordan and Southern Syria in the Late 16th Century. Erlanger Geographische Arbeiten, Sonderband 5. Erlangen, Germany: Vorstand der Fränkischen Geographischen Gesellschaft. ISBN 3-920405-41-2.
- Kleiner, Anya (2018-12-31). "Tur'an (West)" (130). Hadashot Arkheologiyot – Excavations and Surveys in Israel.
- Karmon, Y. (1960). "An Analysis of Jacotin's Map of Palestine" (PDF). Israel Exploration Journal. 10 (3, 4): 155–173, 244–253.
- Lynch, W.F. (1849). Narrative of the United States' Expedition to the River Jordan and the Dead Sea. London: Richard Bentley.
- Massarwa, Abdalla (2010-09-26). "Tur'an Final Report" (122). Hadashot Arkheologiyot – Excavations and Surveys in Israel.
- Mills, E., ed. (1932). Census of Palestine 1931. Population of Villages, Towns and Administrative Areas. Jerusalem: Government of Palestine.
- Moktari, Abdalla (2009-12-30). "Tur'an Final Report" (121). Hadashot Arkheologiyot – Excavations and Surveys in Israel.
- Morris, B. (1987). The Birth of the Palestinian Refugee Problem. Cambridge University Press. ISBN 0-521-33028-9.
- O'Ballance, E. (1956). The Arab-Israeli War, 1948. London: Faber & Faber. ISBN 9780830500451.
- Palmer, E.H. (1881). The Survey of Western Palestine: Arabic and English Name Lists Collected During the Survey by Lieutenants Conder and Kitchener, R. E. Transliterated and Explained by E.H. Palmer. Committee of the Palestine Exploration Fund.
- Rhode, H. (1979). Administration and Population of the Sancak of Safed in the Sixteenth Century. Columbia University.
- Robinson, E.; Smith, E. (1841). Biblical Researches in Palestine, Mount Sinai and Arabia Petraea: A Journal of Travels in the year 1838. Vol. 3. Boston: Crocker & Brewster.
- Schumacher, G. (1888). "Population list of the Liwa of Akka". Quarterly Statement - Palestine Exploration Fund. 20: 169–191.
