= Kinneret Subdistrict =

Coordinates: 32°46′44.0″N 35°32′38.7″E

Kinneret Subdistrict נפת כנרת قضاء كينيرت Tiberias Subdistrict נפת טבריה قضاء طبريا
- Subdistrict
- Northern District in blue, with Kinneret Subdistrict in dark blue
- Interactive map of Kinneret Subdistrict
- Country: Israel
- District: Northern

Area
  - Total: 529 km^{2} (204 sq mi)

Population (2023)
  - Total: 124,800

Ethnicity
  - Jews and others: 70.6%
  - Arabs: 29.4%

The Kinneret Subdistrict is one of the subdistricts of Israel's Northern District. The largest city and the centre of the subdistrict is the city of Tiberias on the western coast of the Sea of Galilee, also known as the Lake of Kinneret.

It spans 529 Km and has a population of 124,800 residents, at the end of 2023, of whom 36,100 were Arabs and 86,900 Jews and others.

== History ==
The region that encompasses this subdistrict has a long history, from prehistoric times, Hellenistic and Roman periods, Middle Ages, and Modern times. This area is the location for many of the ministrations of Jesus and his disciples, as described in the gospels of Mark, Matthew, and John. After the destruction of the Temple in Jerusalem, when the Romans banished the Jews, many relocated to this region. Tiberias, the largest city in the Kinneret Subdistrict, is one of the four holy cities of Judaism.

The subdistrict was established by the State of Israel in the 1950s based on the district in existence during the British Mandate. The first Jewish settlement in the modern era, established along the Sea of Galilee, was Degania, a kibbutz established in 1909. It was followed by several other kibbutzim.

== Demographics ==
Historical population
Year	Pop.	±%
1972	44,900	—
1983	58,200	+29.6%
1995	75,600	+29.9%
2008	96,370	+27.5%
2022	119,084	+23.6%
2024	125,554	+5.4%

== Administrative local authorities ==
Cities	Local Councils	Regional Councils
Maghar; Tiberias	Eilabun; Kfar Kama; Kfar Tavor; Migdal; Yavne'el	al-Batuf (part); Emek HaYarden; Lower Galilee (part)

== Voting Patterns ==
In the 2022 election, 52.8 percent of voters in the subdistrict voted for the parties of the right-wing coalition led by Benjamin Netanyahu, while 34.5 percent voted for the parties of the center-left coalition led by Yair Lapid and 12.7 percent voted for the Arab parties.

In the 2026 election, 45.5 percent of voters in the subdistrict voted for the parties of the right-wing coalition led by Benjamin Netanyahu, while 36 percent voted for the parties of the center-left coalition led by Gadi Eisenkot and 14 percent voted for the Arab parties. An additional 2.3 percent voted for the Reservists, and 1.8 percent voted for Amcha Yisrael. Voter turnout increased 23 percent from the 2022 election.

== Natural Regions ==
Districts, Subdistricts and Natural Regions of the State of Israel, 2018

The Kinneret subdistrict is divided into two major areas with a total of 46 cities, villages and settlements.

- 221 Kinerot
  - Population (2024): 72,206
  - Largest city: Tiberias
- 222 Eastern Lower Galilee
  - Population (2024): 53,348
  - Largest city: Maghar
