= Kvutza =

Jewish communal settlement

A kvutza, kvutzah, kevutza or kevutzah (Hebrew: קבוצה "group") (pl. kvutzot or kvutzoth) is a form of cooperative settlement founded by Jewish immigrants to Palestine during the Second Aliyah and developed during the Third Aliyah. An early form of kibbutz, the first kvutzot sought to create a way of life based on the idea of small, cooperative, intimate communal groups. Members lived in full cooperation, with a common fund for expenses and income and no private property, hierarchical authority or management structures.

== History ==
The term 'kvutza' initially referred to small groups of young people with similar ideals living and working together, and after the foundation of the first permanent community in 1910, to the collective settlements created by such groups.

The first permanent kvutza, Degania (now considered the first kibbutz), was founded by a group of Russian immigrants seeking an alternative to existing cooperative farms. Its success caused a surge of similar settlements built on community ownership and agriculture. By the end of the Second Aliya in 1914 there were 28 kvutzot with a combined total of 380 permanent members.

In 1925, the kvutzot unified into the Hever Hakvutzot (חבר הקבוצות, lit. “Group of the Kvutzot”) federation – the first kibbutz federation, which retained an emphasis on smaller, intimate agricultural communities in contrast to the model of the larger, agro-industrial kibbutzim that would develop during the 1920s and 1930s, and continued to align more closely with the Tolstoyan agrarianism of the kvutzot's early spiritual leader A.D. Gordon than with Marxism. Gradually the distinction between kibbutzim and kvutzot disappeared and most kvutzot, including Degania Alef, became kibbutzim.

== Ideology ==
While the kvutzot were influenced by socialist and communist ideas, the earliest ones arose from the demands of circumstances more than ideology. They emerged as a means of responding to immediate challenges of Jewish settlement of Eretz Israel and from their founders' belief that communal living and cooperative labour were the best and most desirable way of doing so. “The Kommuna ... was not a doctrine” wrote Yosef Baratz, one of the founders of Degania. “It did not come to us from the outside, from other people, from strange countries. We did not read any books about the kvutza; it is a local creation of Eretz Israel. Its source and root is the national and moral ideology.”

Baratz wrote that the group “did not arrive at [the kvutza] idea by a process of objective thought and consideration. It was more a matter of natural feeling: ‘what is the difference between me and my comrade, and why should each of us have a separate account?” His wife Miriam wrote: “it is not a theoretical approach. We had not read about Kommunas in action. We had no examples.”

Nevertheless, their kvutza was established with the explicit aim of creating “a cooperative community without exploiters or exploited.” It was to be a model community with no managers, hierarchies, private property or any form of government, authority or coercion, built on an emphasis on the importance of agricultural labor, communal living and social and economic equality.

Labor Zionist philosopher A.D. Gordon later wrote:

“The basic idea of the kvutza is to arrange its communal life through the strength of the communal idea, through aspiration and the spiritual life, and through communal work so that the members will be interdependent and will influence each other along their positive qualities… The kvutza … can and must work on two fronts. On one side – that of work and nature, the person must be free and must reform him or herself through work and through nature. The individual must associate with the very work and the very nature wherein he or she labours and lives. On the other front, there is the life of the family in the kvutza. The kvutza must serve as a family in the finest meaning of the term. It must develop its members through the strength of their mutual, positive influence.”

In 1923 the Congress of kvutza members decided that “The basic principles of the kvutza pattern of life, the purpose of which is to change the pattern of society, can be made effective by the implementation of principles of equality, mutual aid and mutual responsibility.”

== Contemporary usage ==
The term “kvutza” is today used by urban “kibbutzim of kvutzot” formed by graduates of Socialist Zionist youth movements since the 1980s. Their adoption of the term to describe their communities reflects a conscious attempt to revive the small-group ethos of the kvutzot of the 1910s and 1920s.
