= Degania Alef =

Kibbutz in northern Israel

Degania Alef: דגניה א׳ (Hebrew)
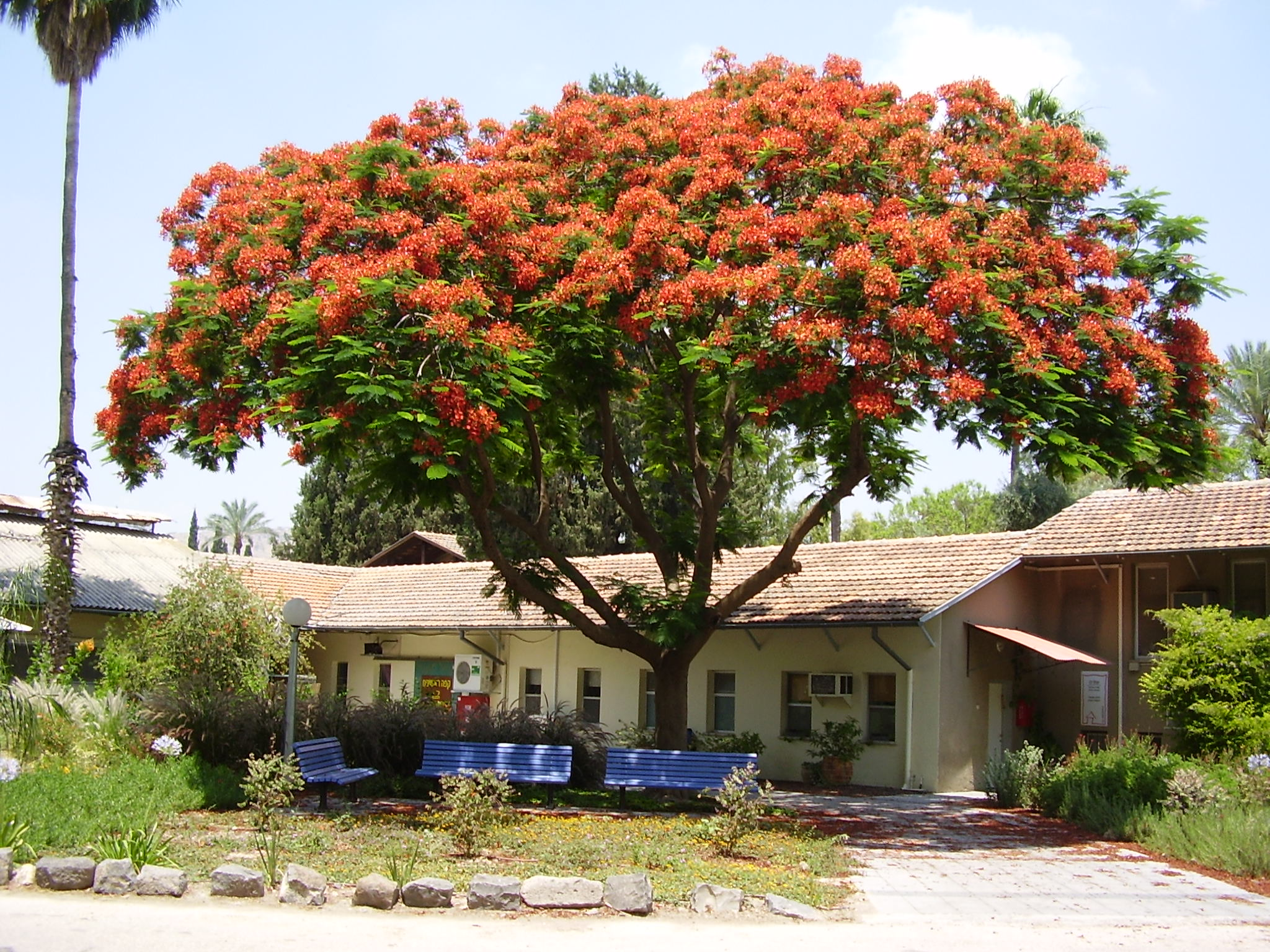
- Part of the 1912 compound

- Location within Northeast Israel Location within Israel
- Coordinates: 32°42′29″N 35°34′29″E
- Country: Israel
- District: Northern
- Subdistrict: Kinneret
- Council: Emek HaYarden
- Affiliation: Kibbutz Movement
- Founded: 1910, after first beginnings in 1909
- Founder: Labor Zionists
- Population (2024): 664
- Website: degania.org.il

Degania Alef (Hebrew: דגניה א׳, Hebrew pronunciation: ['dɡanja 'alef]) is a kibbutz in northern Israel. The Jewish community (kvutza) was founded in 1910, making it the earliest Labor Zionist farming commune in Palestine. Its status as "the mother of all kibbutzim" is sometimes contested based on a later distinction made between the smaller kvutza, applying to Degania in its beginnings, and the larger kibbutz.

It falls under the jurisdiction of the Emek HaYarden (Jordan Valley) Regional Council. Degania Alef and its neighbor Degania Bet both lie south of the southern shore of the Sea of Galilee and along the Jordan River. As of 2024, it had a population of 664.

== Etymology ==
Degania means "cornflower" and is derived from דגן dagán, meaning "grain". After the first phase at Umm Junieh, the group and its settlement was simply called Degania, Alef being added only after the establishment of the associated kibbutzim of Degania Bet and Gimel in 1920. Alef, bet and gimel are the first letters of the Hebrew alphabet and carry the numerical values 1, 2 and 3.

== History ==
=== Roman period ===
According to the 1881 Survey of Western Palestine, Umm Junieh was possibly the place called Union, or Homonœa, by Josephus (Vita, 54).

=== Ottoman period ===
==== Umm Junieh village ====
The Muslim village called Umm Junieh is mentioned during the Late Ottoman period (late 19th century) at the site from which the first Jewish settlers would start establishing their community in 1909–1910. A map from Napoleon's invasion of 1799 by Pierre Jacotin showed the place as ruined. Umm Junieh was just by the ancient bridge known in Arabic as Jisr es-Sidd, which was also noted as ruined by Jacotin.

In 1875, Victor Guérin observed the village of Oumm Djouneh, sitting on a hill east of the river Jordan. In 1881, the PEF's Survey of Western Palestine (SWP) described the place, cited as Umm Junieh, as a stone and adobe village, on the east side of the river Jordan, on the top of the eastern bank of the river. It contained about 250 Muslim inhabitants. All the plain around was arable soil; no trees. A mill was worked at the village. A population list from about 1887 showed that Umm Juny had about 330 inhabitants, all Muslim.

==== Beginnings ====
===== At Umm Juni =====
Degania (later Degania Alef) was the first kvutza-type agricultural settlement established by Zionist pioneers of the New Yishuv under Ottoman rule. The location was south-west of the Sea of Galilee, at a place known in Arabic as Umm Junieh or Umm Juni, within the administrative Ottoman area of Acre Sanjak. It was founded in 1910 by a group of eight men and one woman, the "[labour] conquest group", followed at the end of the same year by what would become the permanent settlers group (ten men and two women).

===== At permanent location =====
In June 1912, the group moved from the mud huts and wooden shack of Umm Juni to the new stone-built compound at its permanent location. That is at the place where the Jordan River emerges from the Sea of Galilee and therefore had the Arabic name Bab al-Tumm, "Gate of the Mouth".

===== Prominent early members =====
The poet Rachel Bluwstein, the "prophet of labor" A. D. Gordon, and paramilitary commander and leading Zionist Joseph Trumpeldor all worked at Degania Alef. Zionist pioneer and future Israeli politician Yosef Baratz was among the founders of Degania Alef. On June 5, 1912, he married and started the first family. His first child, Gideon Baratz (1913–1988), who was born in Degania Alef, was the first child born in a Jewish collective community in Palestine. The second child to be born in Degania Alef was the prominent Israeli general and politician Moshe Dayan. Dayan was named after Moshe Barsky, a member of Degania Alef who was the first kibbutz member killed in an Arab attack. Barsky was killed in November 1913. He was alone in the kibbutz fields when he was shot in the back and left for dead by Arab marauders.

=== British Mandate ===
In 1920 two new kibbutzim, Degania Bet and Degania Gimel, were established to the south of what consequently became Degania Alef or Aleph.

By 1947 Degania Alef had a population of 380.

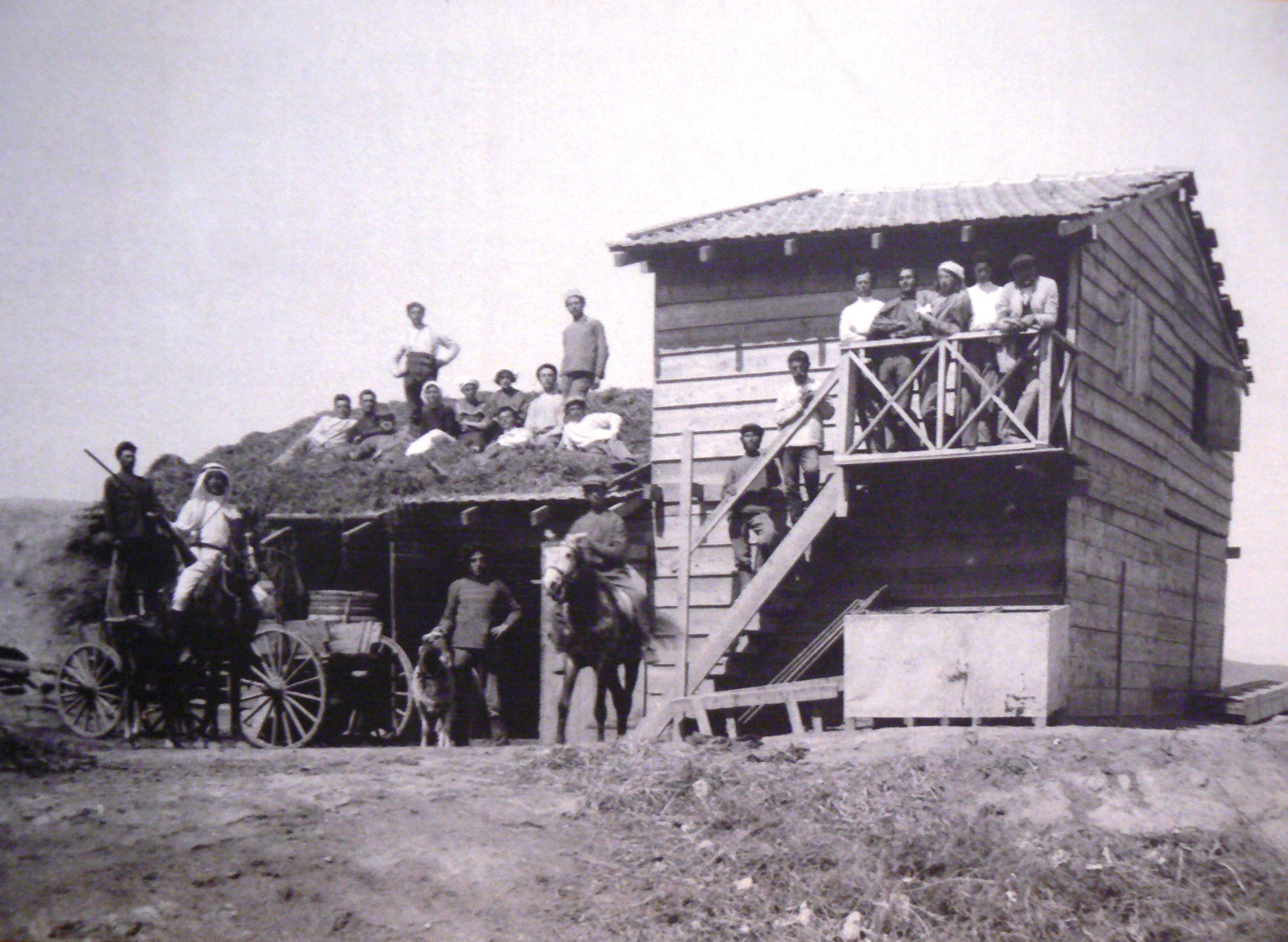
The original wooden shack at Umm Juni, 1910

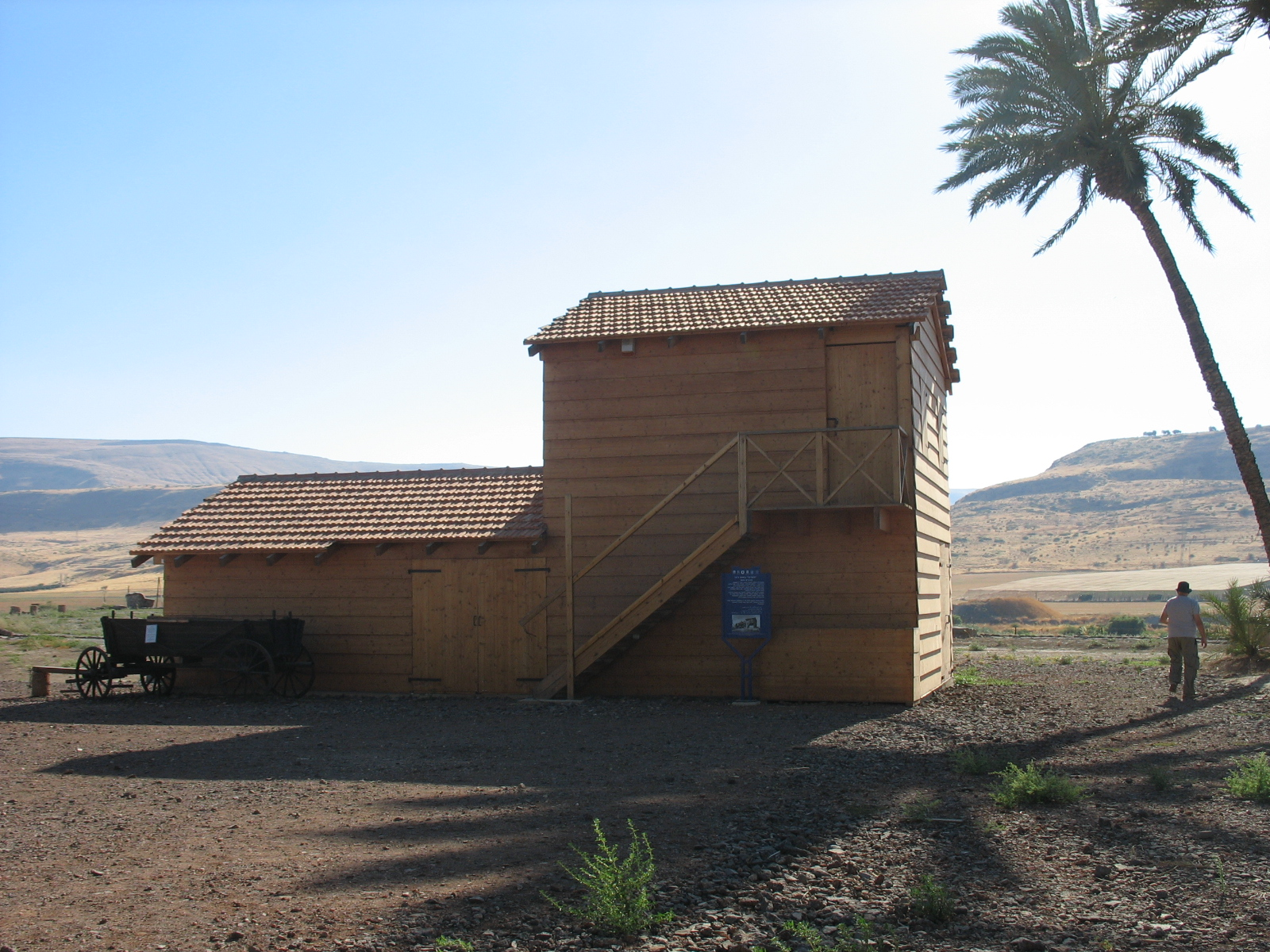
Wooden shack (recent reconstruction) at Umm Juni

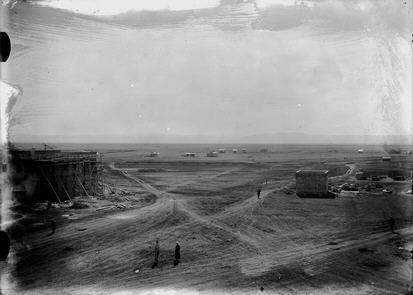
Degania. 1925

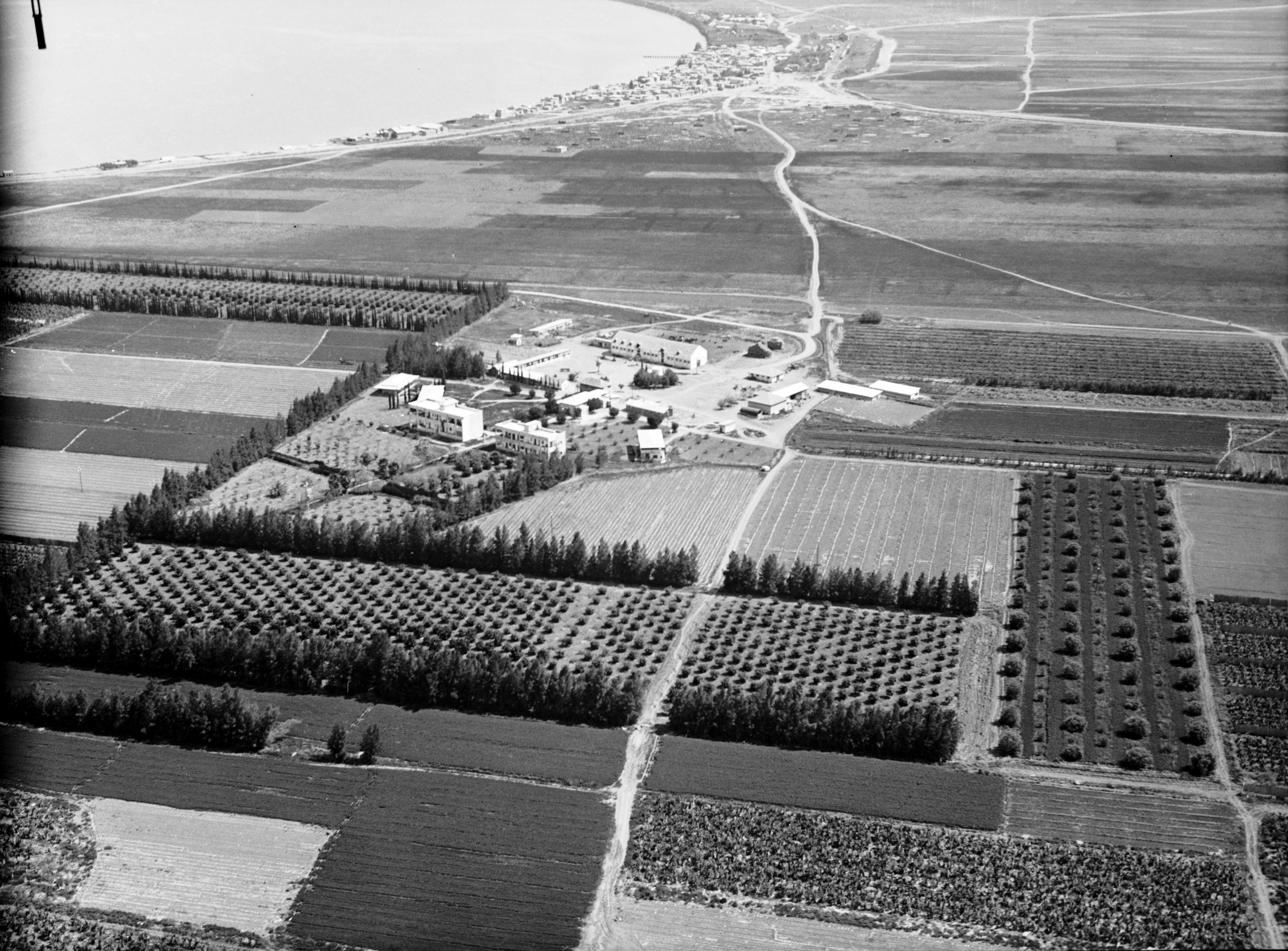
View of Degania Bet, 1931. Samakh is in the background

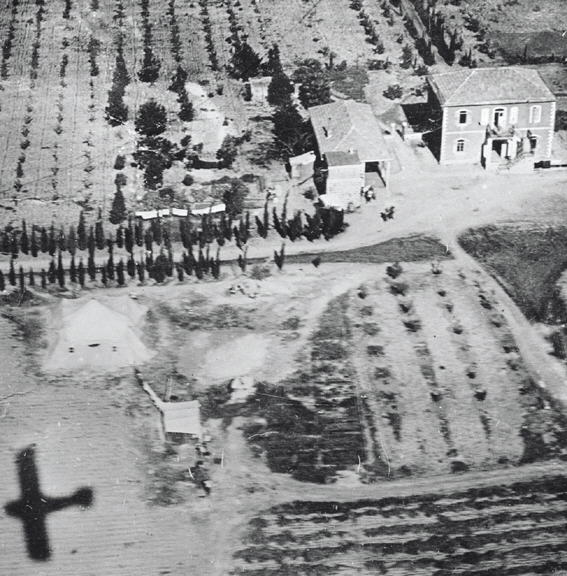
Degania 1932

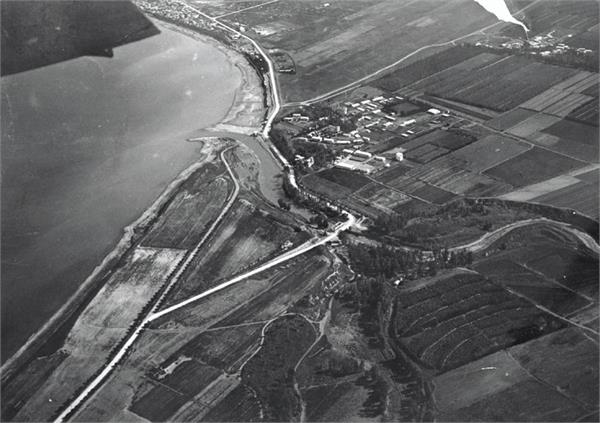
Degania Alef 1939

=== State of Israel ===
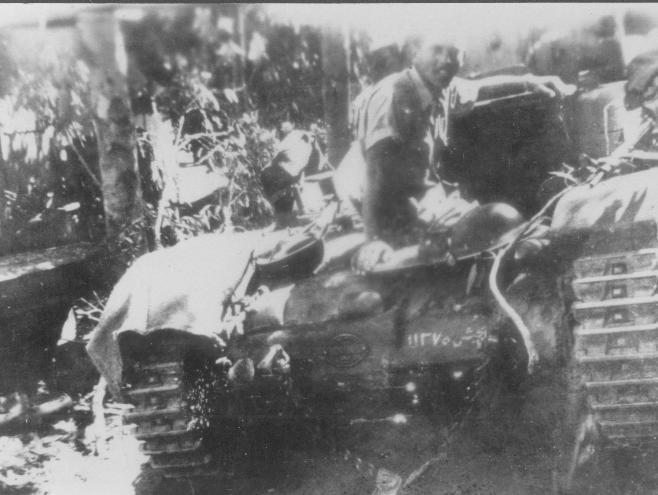
Syrian Renault R35 tank captured in Degania A, 1948. The Yiftach Brigade soldier in the picture was killed two days later

On May 20, 1948, during the Battles of the Kinarot Valley, in one of the first battles of the 1948 Arab–Israeli War, the residents of Degania Alef and Bet, assisted by a small number of military personnel, repelled a Syrian attack and succeeded in halting the advance of the Syrian army into the Jordan Valley. During the attack Degania Alef was completely destroyed by the Syrian army. According to a 1949 book by the Jewish National Fund, the village was destroyed following attacks on the neighboring kibbutzim of Sha'ar HaGolan and Masada. The settlers resisted, however, and launched a counter-attack which helped to recover the neighboring settlements. Reconstruction started almost immediately.

== Economy ==
In 2007, Degania Alef moved to undergo privatisation. Instead of assigned jobs and equal pay under the former communal economy, the reorganisation requires members to find employment, live on their income, and allows them to own their homes, but still offers a form of a social "safety net" supplement for members whose livelihood is inadequate to meet their expenses. This move to privatisation was chronicled in Yitzhak Rubin's 2008 documentary, Degania: The First Kibbutz Fights Its Last Battle.

== Awards and recognition ==
In 1981, Kvutza Degania Alef was awarded the Israel Prize, for its special contribution to society and the State in social pioneering.

== Notable people ==
- Yosef Baratz (1890–1968), one of the founders; Zionist activist and Israeli politician
- Rachel Bluwstein (a.k.a. "Rachel the Poetess"; 1890–1931), national poet
- Moshe Dayan (1915–1981), military man and politician; second child born here
- A. D. Gordon (1856–1922), Zionist ideologist (the "prophet of labor") and pioneer
- Joseph Trumpeldor (1880–1920), Zionist leader, army officer
- Esther Raab (1894–1981), first Sabra poetess

== See also ==
- Arthur Ruppin
- Kinneret Farm
- Second Aliyah
- Romny, the hometown of three of the 1909 "conquest group" at Umm Juni

== Bibliography ==
- Conder, C.R.; Kitchener, H.H. (1882). The Survey of Western Palestine: Memoirs of the Topography, Orography, Hydrography, and Archaeology. Vol. 2. London: Committee of the Palestine Exploration Fund.
- Department of Statistics (1945). Village Statistics, April, 1945. Government of Palestine.
- Guérin, V. (1880). Description Géographique Historique et Archéologique de la Palestine (in French). Vol. 3: Galilee, pt. 1. Paris: L'Imprimerie Nationale.
- Karmon, Y. (1960). "An Analysis of Jacotin's Map of Palestine" (PDF). Israel Exploration Journal. 10 (3, 4): 155–173, 244–253. Archived from the original (PDF) on December 22, 2019.
- Mills, E., ed. (1932). Census of Palestine 1931. Population of Villages, Towns and Administrative Areas. Jerusalem: Government of Palestine.
- Palmer, E.H. (1881). The Survey of Western Palestine: Arabic and English Name Lists Collected During the Survey by Lieutenants Conder and Kitchener, R. E. Transliterated and Explained by E.H. Palmer. Committee of the Palestine Exploration Fund.
- Schumacher, G. (1888). "Population list of the Liwa of Akka". Quarterly Statement – Palestine Exploration Fund. 20: 169–191.
