= Nasir ad-Din, Palestine =

Nasir ad-Din نصر الدين Nasr ad-Din, Nasir al-Din
- Village
- Etymology: from personal name
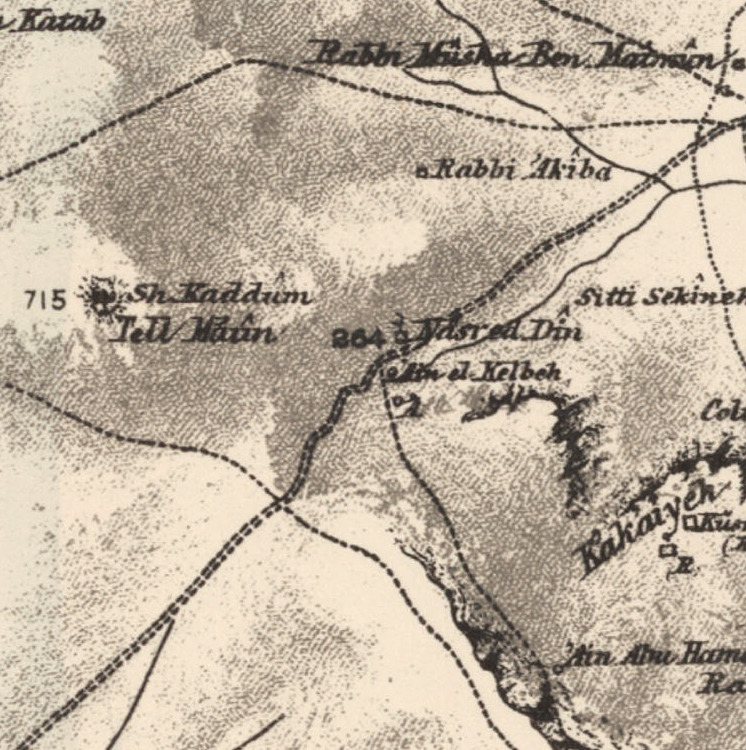
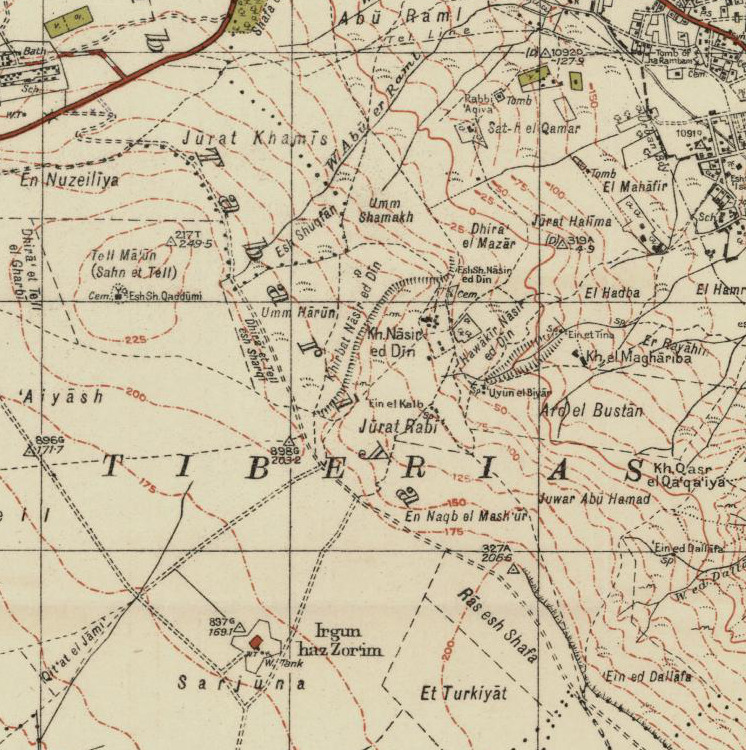
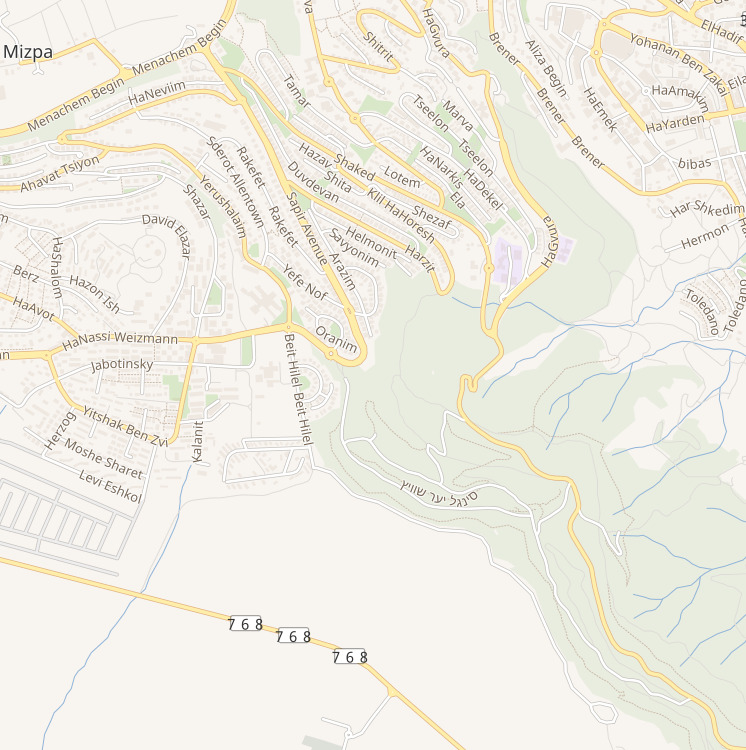
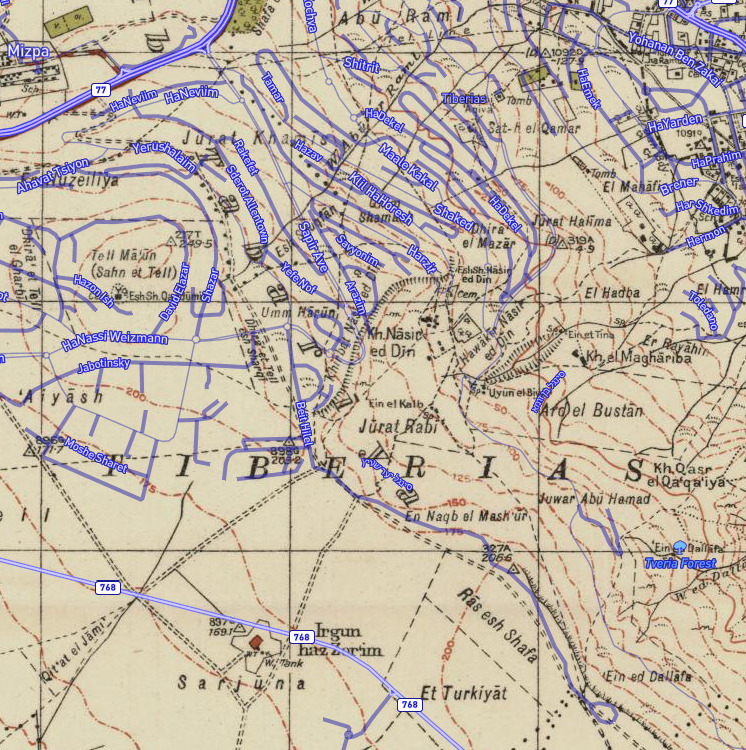
- 1870s map 1940s map modern map 1940s with modern overlay map A series of historical maps of the area around Nasir ad-Din, Palestine (click the buttons)

- Location within Mandatory Palestine
- Coordinates: 32°46′43″N 35°31′24″E
- Palestine grid: 199/242
- Geopolitical entity: Mandatory Palestine
- Subdistrict: Tiberias
- Date of depopulation: 12 and 23 April 1948

Area (together with Al-Manara)
  - Total: 4,185 dunams (4.185 km^{2}; 1.616 sq mi)

Population (1945)
  - Total: 90
- Cause(s) of depopulation: Military assault by Yishuv forces
- Secondary cause: Influence of nearby town's fall
- Tertiary cause: Fear of being caught up in the fighting
- Current Localities: Residential areas of Tiberias

Nasir ad-Dīn (Arabic: نصر الدين; also Naṣr ad-Din) was a small Palestinian Arab village 3 kilometers (1.9 mi) southwest of Tiberias, on the crest of a slope that overlooks the Sea of Galilee. The village had several springs to the east, south, and southeast. In the 1931 British census 179 people lived there, decreasing to 90 in a 1945 census. Nasir ad-Din and nearby al-Manara were in the same jurisdiction with 4,185 dunams of land, most of which was allocated to cereals.

In the 1948 Palestine war, the village was destroyed and its residents expelled as part of the 1948 Palestinian expulsion.

== Etymology ==
According to local legend, the village was named after a shrine dedicated to Nasir ad-Din, an Ayyubid general who died while fighting the Crusaders and buried to the north of the village. A kilometer to the west is the shrine for another Muslim soldier who died fighting the Crusaders, named Sheikh al-Qaddumi. "Nasir al-Deen" and "Sheikh Qadumi" were mentioned separately in the context of the 1948 Palestine war.

== History and archeology ==
=== Antiquity ===
Archeological excavations have shown that the place was inhabited in the Hellenistic period, and that a major settlement stood there during the Roman period, in the 2nd to 4th century CE. Israeli archaeologist Uzi Leibner however argued that the site was abandoned in the late third century, due to the rarity of pottery shards from that period and a complete absence of shards from the fourth century. The ancient settlement is usually identified with Jewish Bethmaus (Bet Ma'on).

=== Ottoman period ===
In 1875, Victor Guérin noted a spring and ruins of a village among which "ten families of poor fellahs eke out a miserable existence". Guérin suggested identifying the site with Bethmaus on the basis of its location matching a description of Josephus.

=== British Mandate ===
In the 1922 census of Palestine, conducted by the British Mandate authorities, Nasir al Din had a population of 109, all Muslims, increasing in the 1931 census to 179, still all Muslims, in 35 houses.

During the British Mandate in Palestine, most of Nasir ad-Din's houses were scattered north–south, with no particular village plan. The inhabitants worked in agriculture and animal breeding.

In the 1944/1945 statistics the population consisted of 90 Muslims, and together with the people of al-Manara they had 4,185 dunams of land. Of this, 4,172 dunams of land were used for cereals, while 13 dunams were classified as built-up (urban) area.

=== 1948 war and destruction ===
On April 12, 1948, a company from the 12th battalion of the Haganah's Golani Brigade captured Nasir ad-Din to cut off Tiberias from major Arab centers to the west (Nazareth and Lubya). The skirmish lasted four hours because the Haganah encountered unexpected local resistance. Historian Saleh Abdel Jawad writes that 12-20 civilians were "massacred by machine guns." Most of the inhabitants fled to Tiberias or Lubya — British troops escorted villagers to Lubya. The Haganah reported 22 Arabs were killed, six wounded, and three captured. The civilian deaths included seven men, at least one woman, and a number of children. Two Haganah troops were also wounded.

The capture and killing in Nasir ad-Din was a decisive factor for the flight of Arabs from Tiberias, and was a major demoralizing factor for Arab forces. Historian Benny Morris reports that some Palestinians at the time described the attack as "a second Deir Yassin", in reference to the highly publicized Deir Yassin massacre which had occurred days prior. (Note: Benny Morris, The Birth of the Palestinian Refugee Problem Revisited (2004), "The Arabs subsequently alleged that 'there had been a second Deir Yassin' in Nasir ad Din – and, indeed, some non-combatants, including women and children, were killed.") All the houses were destroyed, and residents that remained were expelled on April 23.

== Bibliography ==
- Abu-'Uqsa, Hanaa (2008-08-10). "Tiberias, Khirbat Nasir ed-Din East". Hadashot Arkheologiyot (120). Hadashot Arkheologiyot – Excavations and Surveys in Israel.
- Barron, J.B., ed. (1923). Palestine: Report and General Abstracts of the Census of 1922. Government of Palestine.
- Department of Statistics (1945). Village Statistics, April, 1945. Government of Palestine.
- M. V. Guérin (1880). Description géographique, historique et archéologique de la Palestine. Vol. Galilée I. Paris.
- Hadawi, S. (1970). Village Statistics of 1945: A Classification of Land and Area ownership in Palestine. Palestine Liberation Organization Research Center.
- Khalidi, W. (1992). All That Remains:The Palestinian Villages Occupied and Depopulated by Israel in 1948. Washington D.C.: Institute for Palestine Studies. ISBN 0-88728-224-5.
- Leibner, Uzi (2009). "Site No. 46: 19-24/92/46: Nasr ed-Din". Settlement and History in Hellenistic, Roman, and Byzantine Galilee. Mohr Siebeck. pp. 286–296. ISBN 3161498712.
- Mills, E., ed. (1932). Census of Palestine 1931. Population of Villages, Towns and Administrative Areas. Jerusalem: Government of Palestine.
- Morris, B. (2004). The Birth of the Palestinian Refugee Problem Revisited. Cambridge University Press. ISBN 978-0-521-00967-6.
- Palmer, E.H. (1881). The Survey of Western Palestine: Arabic and English Name Lists Collected During the Survey by Lieutenants Conder and Kitchener, R. E. Transliterated and Explained by E.H. Palmer. Committee of the Palestine Exploration Fund.
