= Tiberias Subdistrict, Mandatory Palestine =

Administrative division of British Palestine (1920–1948)

Tiberias Subdistrict قضاء طبريا נפת טבריה
- Subdistrict of Mandatory Palestine
- 1920–1948
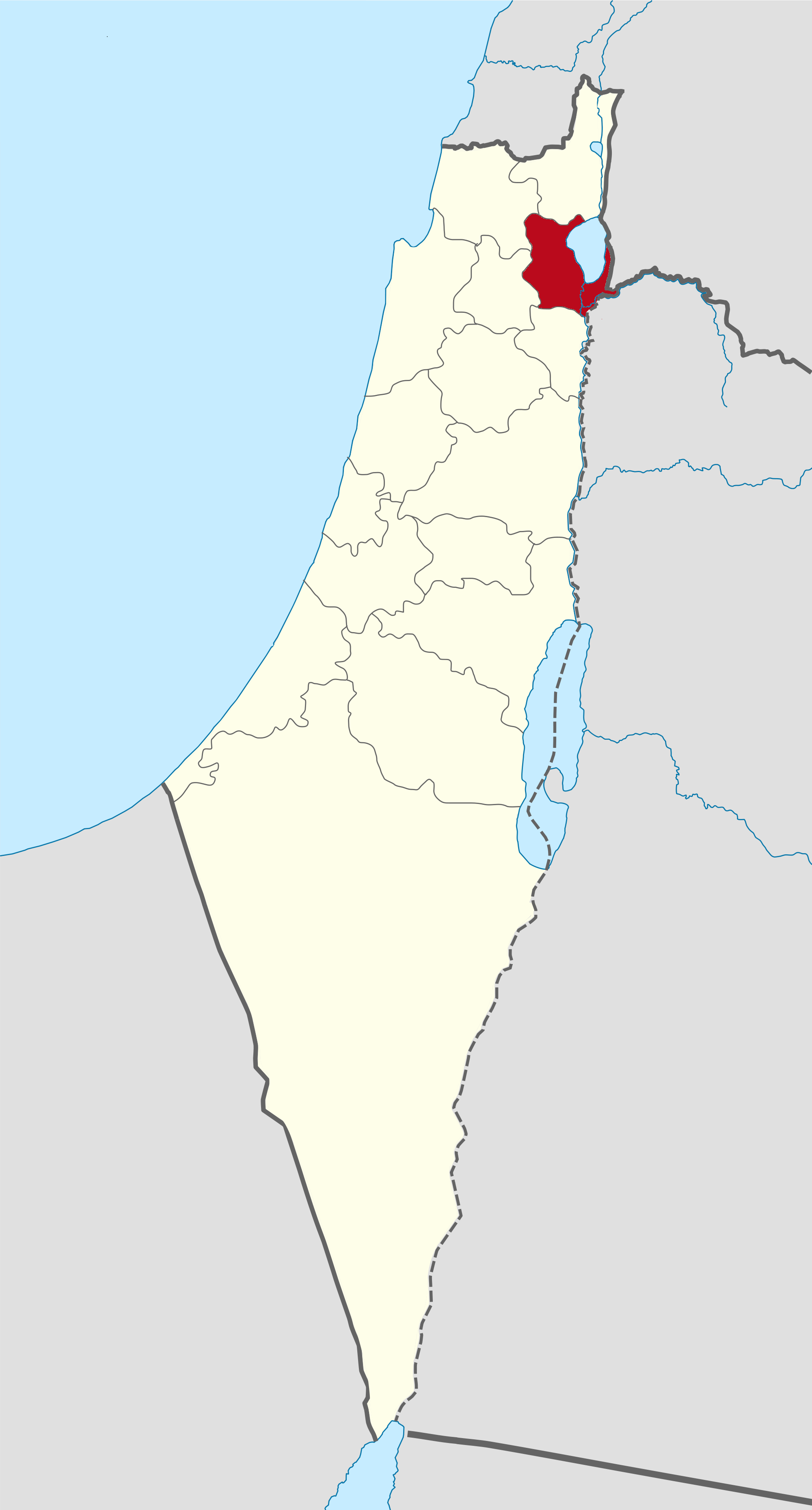
- Capital: Tiberias
- Demonym: ṭabarānī (male) ṭabarāniyyah (female) (ar)
- History
  - Established: 1920
  - Disestablished: 1948
Preceded by	Succeeded by
Acre Sanjak	Northern District (Israel)
- Today part of: Israel

Tiberias Subdistrict (Arabic: قضاء طبريا; Hebrew: נפת טבריה) was one of the subdistricts of Mandatory Palestine, and as of 1945 it was part of the Galilee District.

According to the 1947 partition plan, the district was to belong entirely to the Jewish state. After the 1948 Arab-Israeli War, small areas south and east of the Sea of Galilee were conquered by the Syrian Army and became No Man's Land, while the whole of the sub-district became the modern Kineret sub-district Kinneret County in the North District

== Borders ==
- Safad Subdistrict (North)
- Acre Subdistrict (West)
- Beisan Subdistrict (South)
- Nazareth Subdistrict (West)
- Syria (East)

== Towns and villages ==
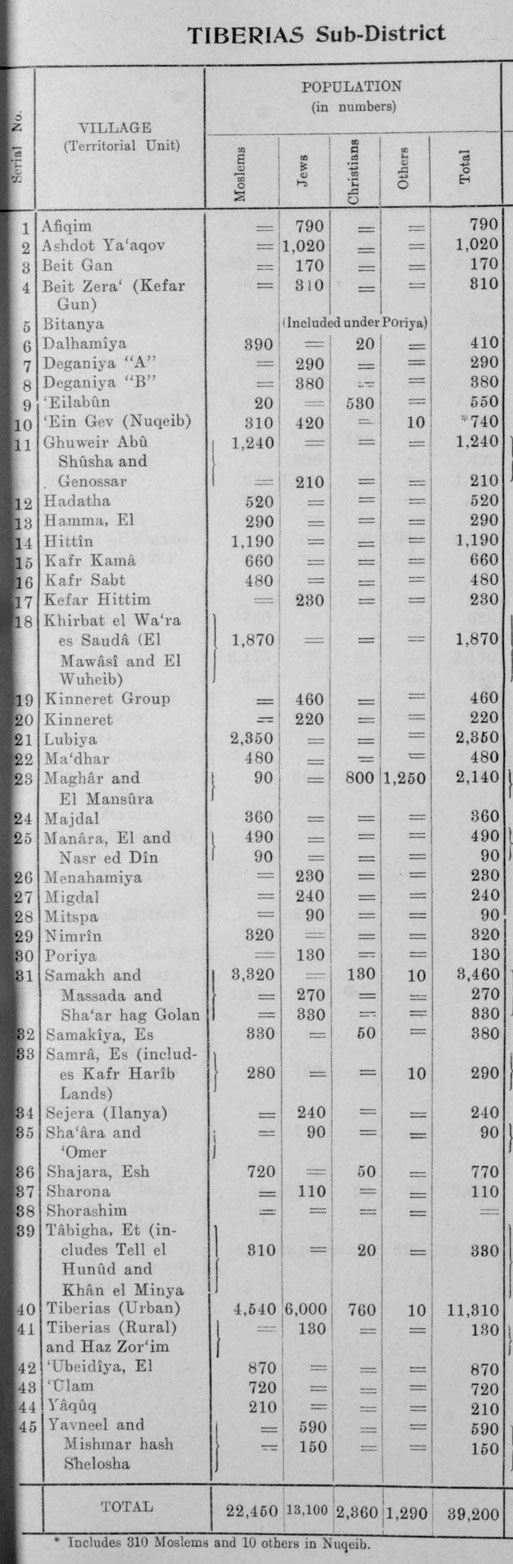
Official population statistics for the sub-district, from Village Statistics, 1945.

Tiberias Sub-District – Population by Village
Village	Muslims	Jews	Christians	Others	Total
Afikim		790			790
Ashdot Ya‘aqov		1,020			1,020
Beit Gan		170			170
Beit Zera‘ (Kefar Gun)		310			310
Bitanya					
Dahamiya	390		20		410
Deganiya “A”		290			290
Deganiya “B”		380			380
‘Eilabun	20		530		550
‘Ein Gev (Nugeib)	310	420		10	740
Ghuweir Abu Shusha	1,240				1,240
Gennossar		210			210
Hadatha	520				520
Hamma (El)	290				290
Hittin	1,190				1,190
Kafr Kama	660				660
Kafr Sabt	480				480
Kefar Hittim		230			230
Khirbat el Wa‘ra es Sauda (El Mawasi and El Wuheib)	1,870				1,870
Kinneret Group		460			460
Kinneret		220			220
Lubiya	2,350				2,350
Ma‘dhar	480				480
Maghar and El Mansura	90		800	1,250	2,140
Majdal	360				360
Manara (El)	490				490
Nasr ed Din	90				90
Menahamiyya		230			230
Migdal		240			240
Mitspa		90			90
Nimrin	320				320
Poriya		130			130
Samakh	3,320		130	10	3,460
Massada		270			270
Sha‘ar hag Golan		330			330
Samakiya (Es)	330		50		380
Samra (Es, includes Kafr Harib lands)	280			10	290
Sejera (Ilaniya)		240			240
Sha‘ara and ‘Omer		90			90
Shajara (Esh)	720		50		770
Sharona		110			110
Shorashim					
Tabigha (Et, includes Tell el Hunud and Khan el Minya)	310		20		330
Tiberias (Urban)	4,540	6,000	760	10	11,310
Tiberias (Rural)		130			130
‘Ubeidiya (El)	870				870
‘Ulam	720				720
Ya‘quq	210				210
Yavne’el and Mishmar hash Shelosha		590			590
Mishmar hash Shelosha		150			150
TOTAL	22,450	13,100	2,360	1,290	39,200

=== Depopulated towns and villages ===
- Awlam
- al-Dalhamiyya
- Ghuwayr Abu Shusha
- Hadatha
- al-Hamma
- Hittin
- Kafr Sabt
- Lubya
- Ma'dhar
- al-Majdal
- al-Manara
- al-Manshiyya
- al-Mansura
- Nasir ad-Din
- Nimrin
- al-Nuqayb
- Samakh
- al-Samakiyya
- al-Samra
- al-Shajara
- Tabgha
- Ubeidiya
- Khirbat al-Wa'ra al-Sawda'
- Yaquq
