= Bethmaus =

Second Temple Jewish village

- בית מעון (Hebrew)
- Location within Israel's Northern District Location within Israel
- 32°47′40″N 35°32′00″E
- Periods: Persian; Hellenistic; Roman/Byzantine
- Cultures: Jewish
- Location: Israel
- Region: Lower Galilee

History
- Built: Second Temple period
- Abandoned: Ottoman period

Site notes
- Condition: Ruined

Bethmaus, (Greek: Βηθμαούς) or Beth Maʿon (Hebrew: בית מעון), also called Maon, was a Jewish village during the Late Second Temple and Mishnaic periods, tentatively identified with the site of Nasir ad-Din by Guérin (1875) and with Tell Maʿūn slightly west of it by Kitchener (1881). Ishtori Haparchi had situated it in 1322 upon the hill directly north-west of the city of Tiberias, at a distance of one biblical mile, rising to an elevation of 250 metres (820 ft) above sea-level. It is now incorporated within the modern city bounds of Upper Tiberias. The remaining historical structure at the site is a sheikh's tomb.

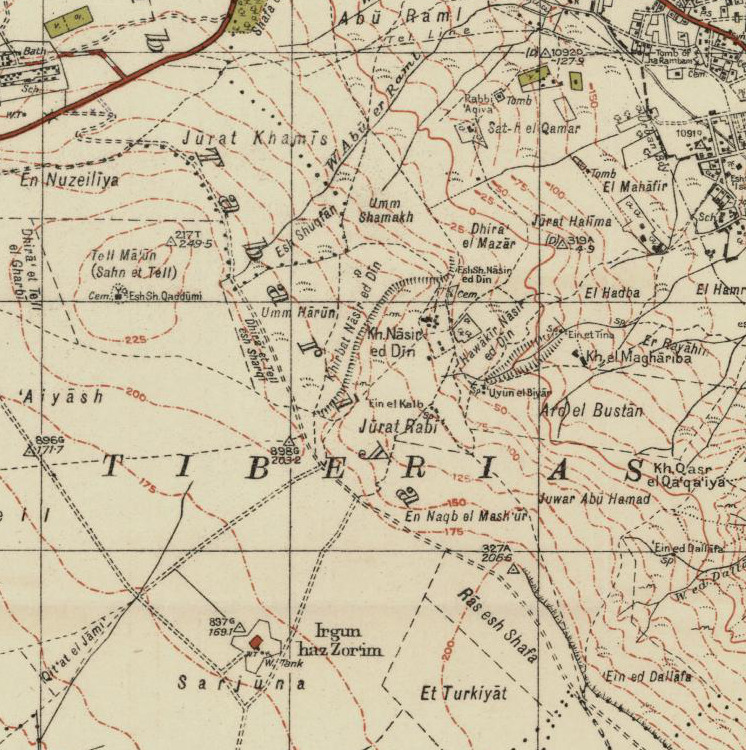
"Tell Mā'un (Sahn et Tell)" on a hill and "Kh. Nāsir ed Dīn" east of it, 1940s map

Some modern researchers place the ancient Bethmaus (Ma'on) at the site of the ruined Arab village of Khirbet Nadhr ad-Din or Kh. Naṣr ad-Din, saying that with the passing of time, the old namesake was transferred to Tell Maʿūn, a short distance away.

The Midrash (Genesis Rabba § 85:7) says of the village, "Beth Maʿon, they ascend to it from Tiberias, but they go down to it from Kefar Shobtai." The Jerusalem Talmud, citing a variant account, says that they would go down to Beth Maʿon from its broad place.

== Historical sources ==
Josephus, the Jewish general turned historian, mentions that when he was put in charge of the public affairs of Galilee by the people of Jerusalem during the war with Rome, he moved with two of his fellow-legates who were priests of Aaron's lineage from Sepphoris to the village Bethmaus (henceforth: Beth Maʿon), a village situated four furlongs (stadia) distant from Tiberias. It was at Beth Maʿon that Josephus met Justus of Tiberias. There, they convened a meeting with the principal persons of Tiberias, to discuss a plan to demolish a house built by Herod the Tetrarch in Tiberias, and which had the figures of living creatures in it (contrary to Jewish law), but to restore the royal furniture of that house, consisting of candlesticks made of Corinthian brass, and of royal tables, and of a great quantity of uncoined silver, to the king. However, when Josephus took leave of Beth Maʿon and went into Upper Galilee, before Josephus and the senate of Tiberias could carry out their schemes, certain mariners and poor people of Galilee had plundered the house built by Herod of its effects, and taken away the spoils.

In the early 2nd-century CE, following the Bar Kokhba revolt, Beth Maʿon became the residence of one of the priestly clans known as Ḥuppah. Around this time, representatives of the twenty-four priestly wards moved and settled in the Galilee. In the 20th century, three stone inscriptions were discovered bearing the names of the priestly wards, their order and the name of the locality to which they had moved after the destruction of the Second Temple: In 1920, a stone inscription was found in Ashkelon showing a partial list of the priestly wards; in 1962 three small fragments of one Hebrew stone inscription bearing the partial names of places associated with the priestly courses (the rest of which had been reconstructed) were found in Caesarea Maritima, dated to the third-fourth centuries; in 1970 a stone inscription was found on a partially buried column in a mosque, in the Yemeni village of Bayt al-Ḥaḍir, showing ten names of the priestly wards and their respective towns and villages. The Yemeni inscription is the longest roster of names of this sort ever discovered unto this day, and mentions the priestly course in Beth Maʿon. The seventh-century poet, Eleazar ben Killir, echoing the same tradition, also wrote a liturgical poem detailing the 24-priestly wards and their places of residence.

In the 3rd-century CE, Rabbi Yohanan officiated in the synagogue of Maon and was called to render a decision in the case of a ritual slaughterer (shochet) who had improperly slaughtered a chicken and whether or not he was to be held liable on that account. Many other incidents are attributed unto Rabbi Yohanan in Maon, one of which involved the kid of a goat that was roasted whole over a spit without first removing the suet (forbidden fat).

In extant Turkish documents dating to May 1566, the Ottoman sultan Suleiman the Magnificent ordered that water be drawn from Beth Maʿon and brought to Tiberias, the purpose of which is not now known, although thought to have been for agricultural crops. By April 1566, when the work had not yet been completed and the workers (under Don Joseph Nasi) demanded more money from the sultan to complete the project, he refused their demand. Below Beth Maʿon, between the ruins of the ancient village and Tiberias, are found three natural springs: ʿAin el-Kelbeh, ʿAin et-Tineh and al-Biyyar.

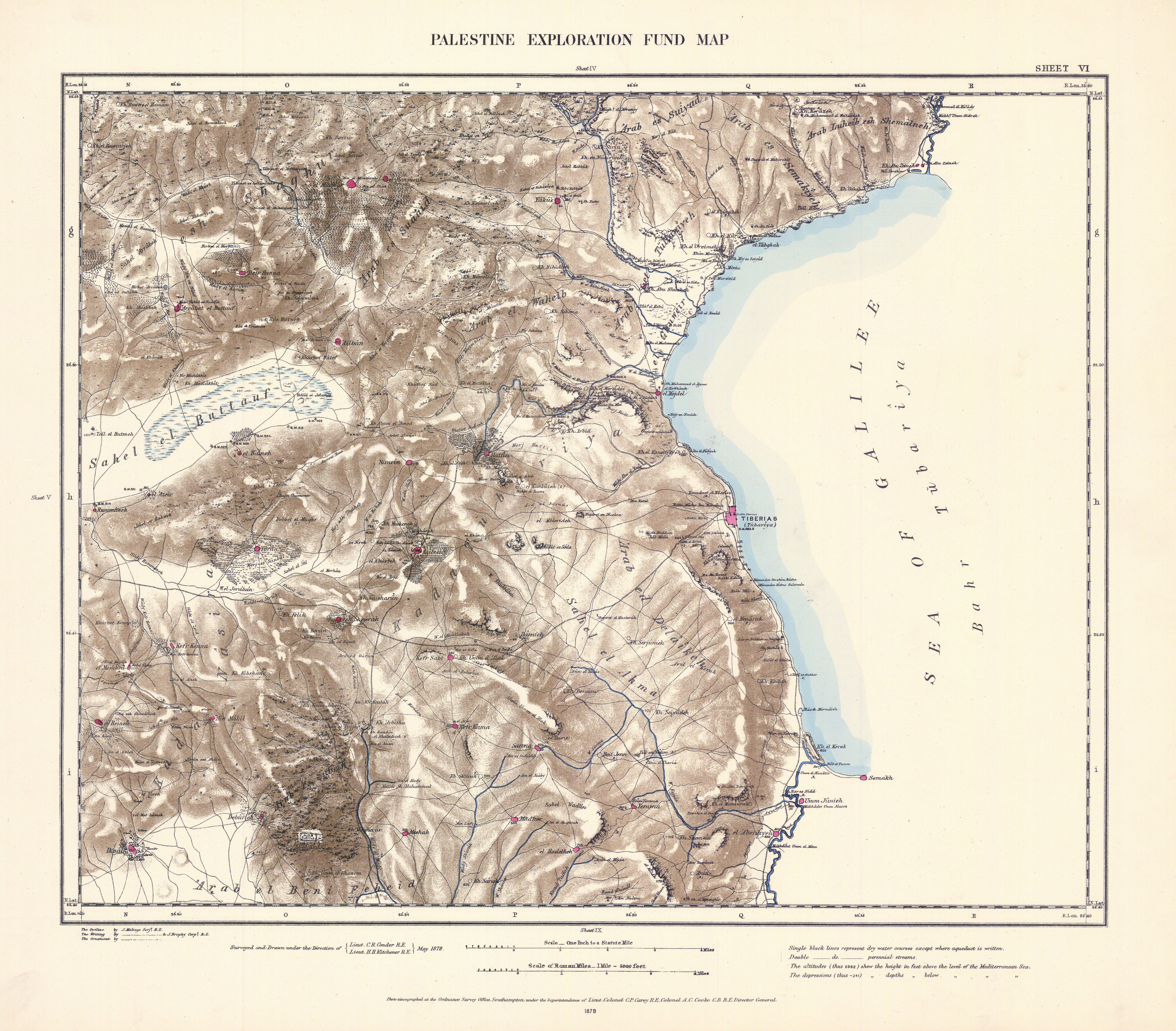
Palestine Exploration Fund map of 1880, showing "Tell Mʿaûn" WSW of Tiberias

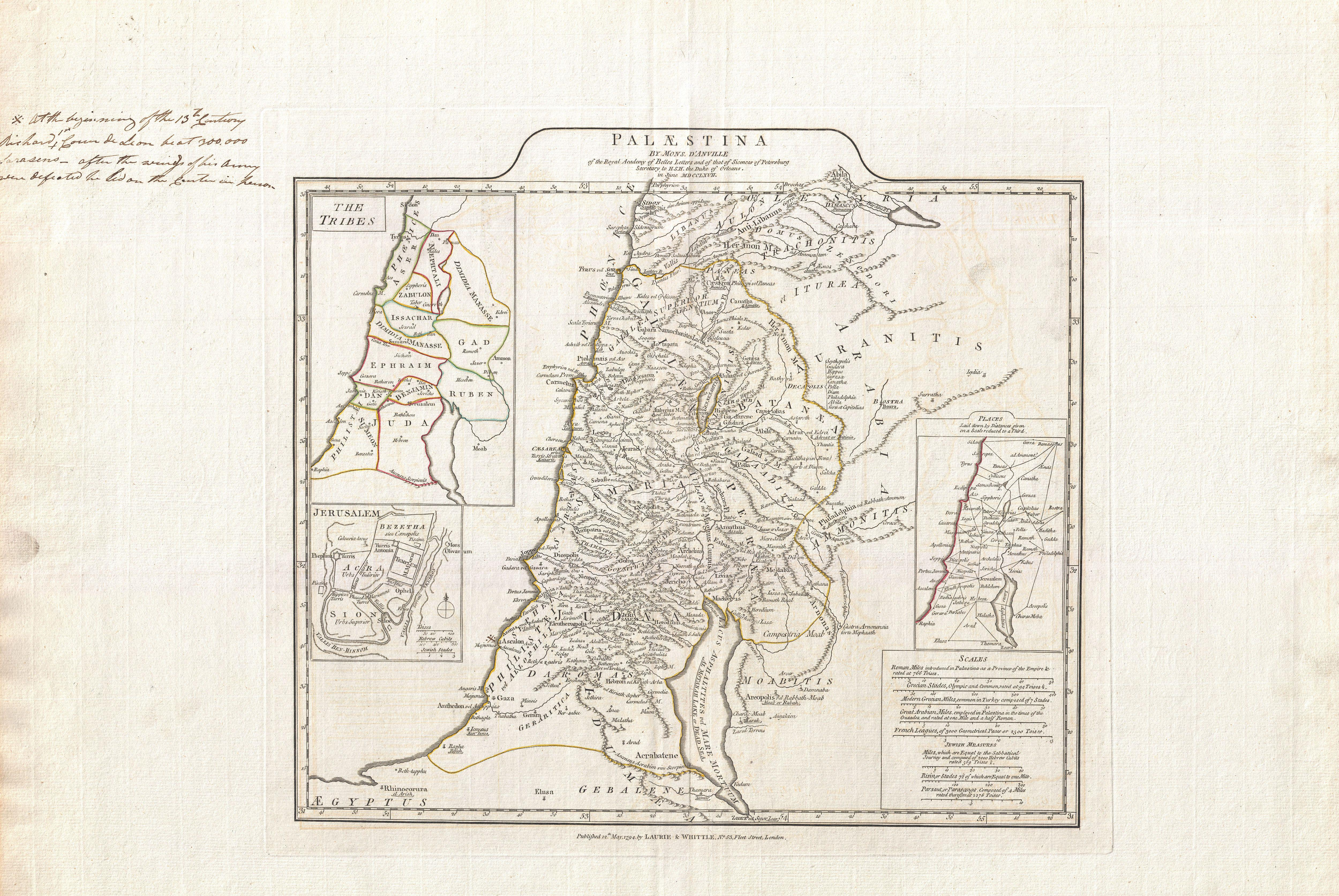
1794 d'Anville map of "Palæstina" (Holy Land), showing "Bethmaus" SW of Tiberias or "Tabarie"

== Archaeology ==
Based on the potsherds found in situ, the place was inhabited as early as the Bronze Age and Iron Age.

== Bibliography ==
- Avi-Yonah, M. (1962). "A List of Priestly Courses from Caesarea". Israel Exploration Journal. 12 (2): 137–139. JSTOR 27924896.
- Avi-Yonah, M. (1964). "The Caesarea Inscription of the Twenty-Four Priestly Courses". Eretz-Israel: Archaeological, Historical and Geographical Studies (in Hebrew). L.A. Mayer Memorial Volume (1895-1959): 24–28. JSTOR 23614642.
- Conder, C.R. (1879). Tent Work in Palestine - A Record of Discovery and Adventure. Vol. 2. London: Richard Bentley & Son.
- Conder, C.R.; Kitchener, H.H. (1881). The Survey of Western Palestine: Memoirs of the Topography, Orography, Hydrography, and Archaeology. Vol. 1. London: Committee of the Palestine Exploration Fund.
- Heyd, U. [in Hebrew] (1966). "Turkish Documents on the Rebuilding of Tiberias in the sixteenth century". Sefunot: Studies and Sources on the History of the Jewish Communities in the East. 10: 193–210. JSTOR 23416042.
- Ishtori Haparchi (2007). Avraham Yosef Havatzelet (ed.). Sefer Kaftor Ve'ferah (in Hebrew). Vol. 2 (chapter 11). Jerusalem.
- Klein, S. (1909). "Barajta der vierundzwanzig Priester Abteilungen (Baraitta of the Twenty-Four Priestly Divisions)". Beiträge zur Geographie und Geschichte Galiläas (in German).
- Klein, S. (1939). Sefer Ha-Yishuv (The Book of the Yishuv: A treasure of information and records, inscriptions and memoirs, preserved in Israel and in the people in the Hebrew language and in other languages on the settlement of the Land of Israel) (in Hebrew). Jerusalem: Bialik Institute.
- Klein, S. (1945). Yehuda Elitzur (ed.). Land of the Galilee: From the Time of Babylonian Immigration until the Redaction of the Talmud (in Hebrew). Jerusalem: Mossad Harav Kook.
- Neubauer, A. (1868). Géographie du Talmud (in French). Paris: M. Lévy Frères.
- Rosenfeld, Ben-Zion (1998). "Places of Rabbinic Settlement in the Galilee, 70-400 C.E.: Periphery versus Center". Hebrew Union College Annual. 69: 57–103. JSTOR 23508858.
- Yitzhaki, Arieh, ed. (1978). "Ancient Places in the Vicinity of Tiberias". Israel Guide - Lower Galilee and Kinneret Region (A useful encyclopedia for the knowledge of the country) (in Hebrew). Vol. 3. Jerusalem: Keter Publishing House. OCLC 745203905.
