= Al-Manara, Palestine =

Al-Menara المنارة
- Village
- Etymology: the light-house
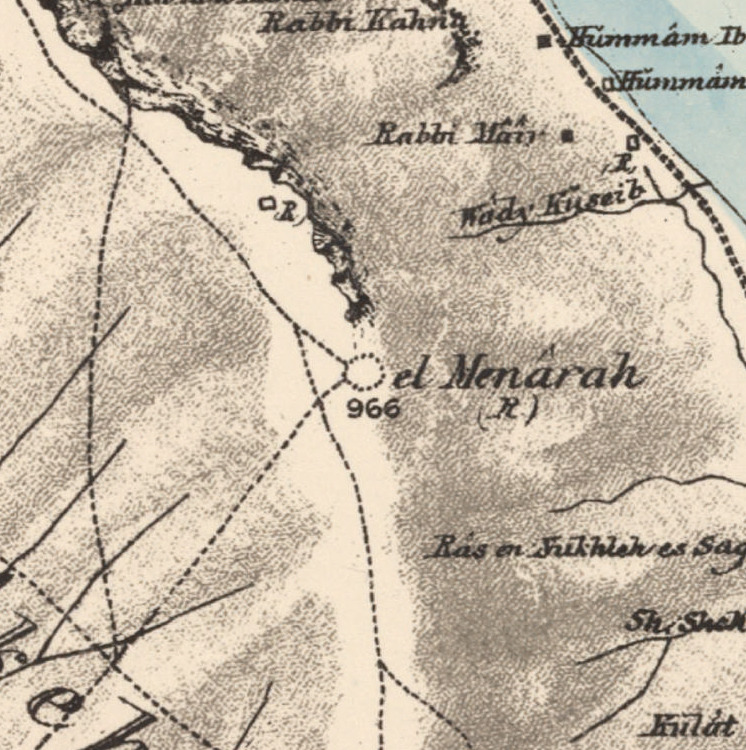
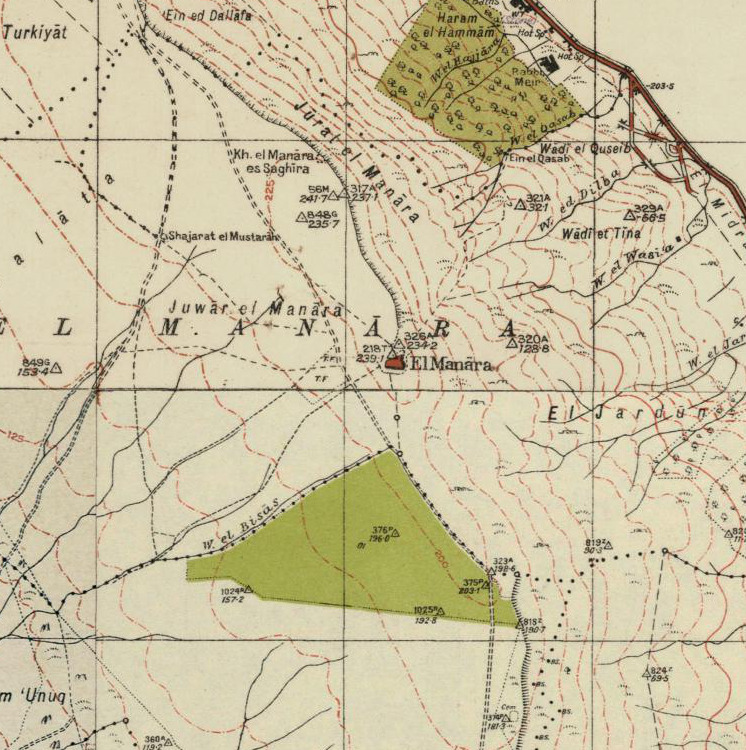
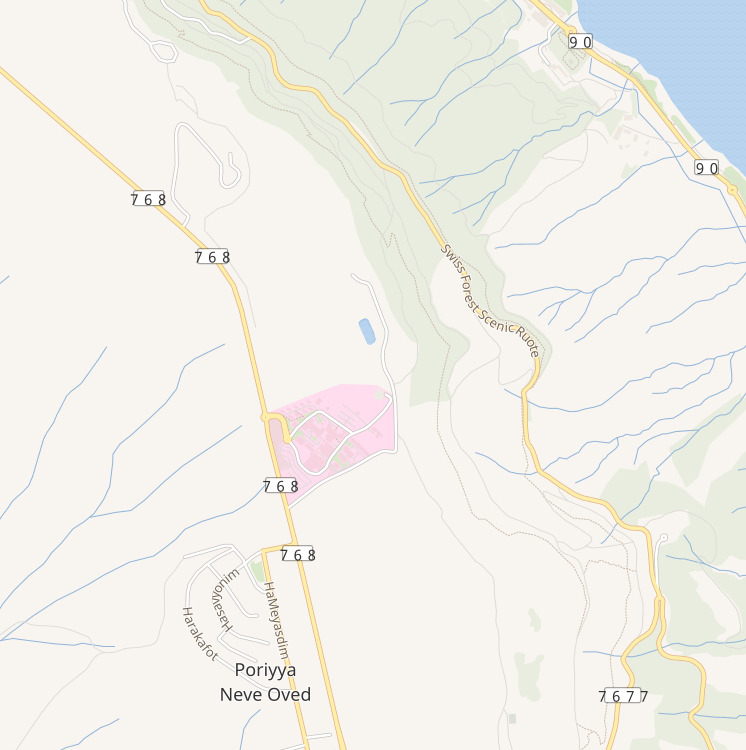
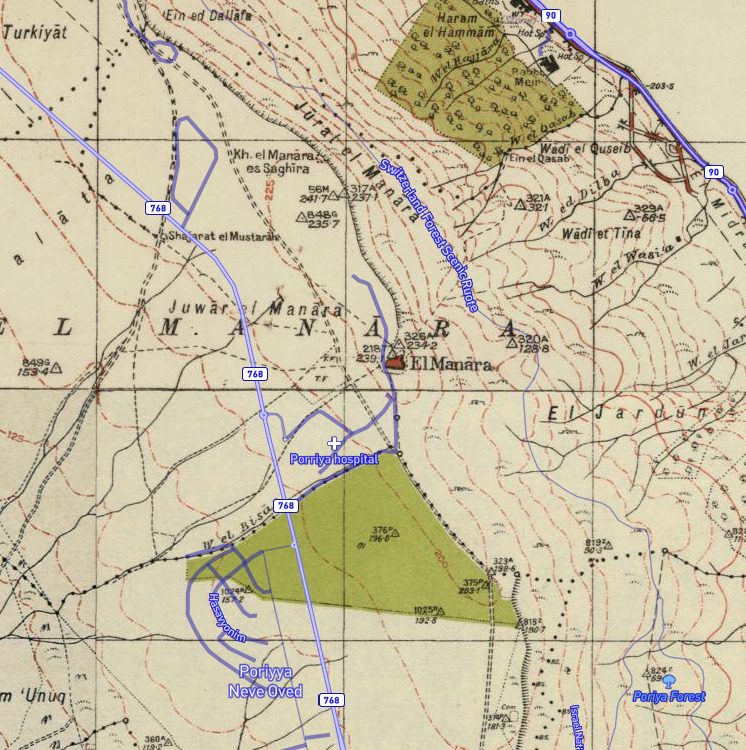
- 1870s map 1940s map modern map 1940s with modern overlay map A series of historical maps of the area around Al-Manara, Palestine (click the buttons)

- Location within Mandatory Palestine
- Coordinates: 32°45′17″N 35°32′32″E
- Palestine grid: 201/240
- Geopolitical entity: Mandatory Palestine
- Subdistrict: Tiberias
- Date of depopulation: early March, 1948

Area
  - Total: 4,185 dunams (4.185 km^{2}; 1.616 sq mi)

Population (1945)
  - Total: 490
- Cause(s) of depopulation: Military assault by Yishuv forces

Al-Manara (Arabic: المنارة) was a Palestinian Arab village in the Tiberias Subdistrict. It was depopulated during the 1947–1948 Civil War in Mandatory Palestine on March 1, 1948, by Jewish troops. It was located 5 km south of Tiberias.

== History ==
Al-Manara contains Khirbat al-Manara and Khirbat Sarjuna. Crusaders referred to al-Manara as Menan.

The site is identified with Kefar Menori (Hebrew: כפר מנורי), a village mentioned in the Tosefta.

In 1881, the PEF's Survey of Western Palestine noted at el Menarah: "Ruined Arab houses, all basalt; no cisterns".

=== British Mandate era ===
In the 1922 census of Palestine, conducted by the British Mandate authorities, Manara had a population of 122; 121 Muslims and 1 Jew, increasing in the 1931 census to 214 Muslims, in 33 houses.

In the 1944/1945 statistics it had total population of 490 Muslims, and together with the people of Nasir ad-Din they had 4,185 dunams of land. Of this, 4,172 dunams of land were used for cereals, while 13 dunams were classified as built-up (urban) area.

=== 1948, aftermath ===
Al-Manara was depopulated in early March, 1948.

There are no Israeli settlement on village land, the closest is Poria Illit, located to the south of the site. In 1992 the village site was described: "The site has been levelled and is strewn with pieces of black stone. At its northern edge are walls of dark stone, with doum palm trees growing in their midst. At the site, a sign (in Arabic, Hebrew, and English) reads: This is a historical site, please protect it."

== Bibliography ==
- Barron, J. B., ed. (1923). Palestine: Report and General Abstracts of the Census of 1922. Government of Palestine.
- Conder, C.R.; Kitchener, H.H. (1881). The Survey of Western Palestine: Memoirs of the Topography, Orography, Hydrography, and Archaeology. Vol. 1. London: Committee of the Palestine Exploration Fund.
- Department of Statistics (1945). Village Statistics, April, 1945. Government of Palestine.
- Hadawi, S. (1970). Village Statistics of 1945: A Classification of Land and Area ownership in Palestine. Palestine Liberation Organization Research Center. Archived from the original on 2018-12-08.
- Khalidi, W. (1992). All That Remains:The Palestinian Villages Occupied and Depopulated by Israel in 1948. Washington D.C.: Institute for Palestine Studies. ISBN 0-88728-224-5.
- Mills, E., ed. (1932). Census of Palestine 1931. Population of Villages, Towns and Administrative Areas. Jerusalem: Government of Palestine.
- Morris, B. (2004). The Birth of the Palestinian Refugee Problem Revisited. Cambridge University Press. ISBN 978-0-521-00967-6.
- Palmer, E.H. (1881). The Survey of Western Palestine: Arabic and English Name Lists Collected During the Survey by Lieutenants Conder and Kitchener, R. E. Transliterated and Explained by E.H. Palmer. Committee of the Palestine Exploration Fund.
