= Kafr Sabt =

Kafr Sabt كفر سبت Kafar Sabt
- Village
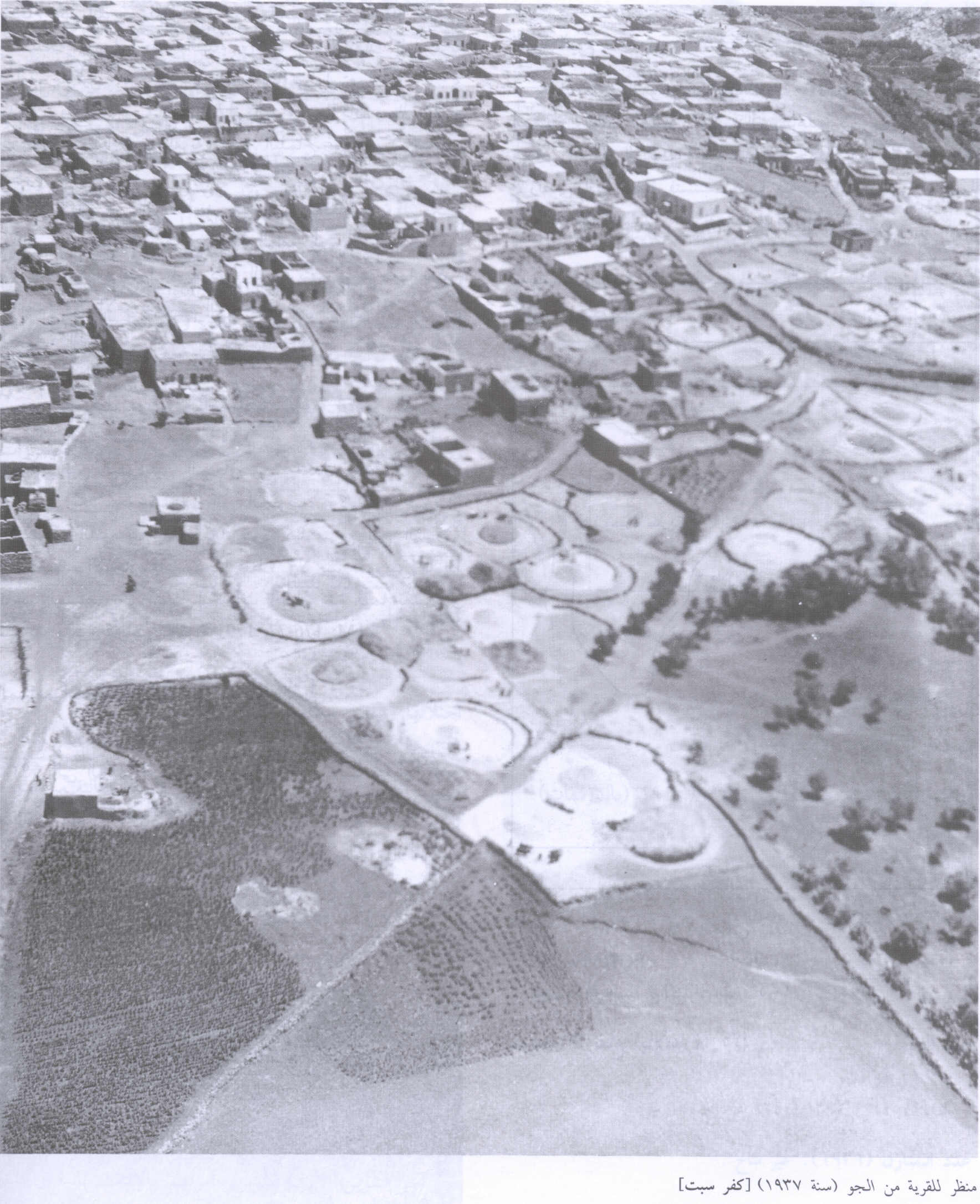
- Kafr Sabt, from the air, 1937
- Etymology: "Village of Sabbath"
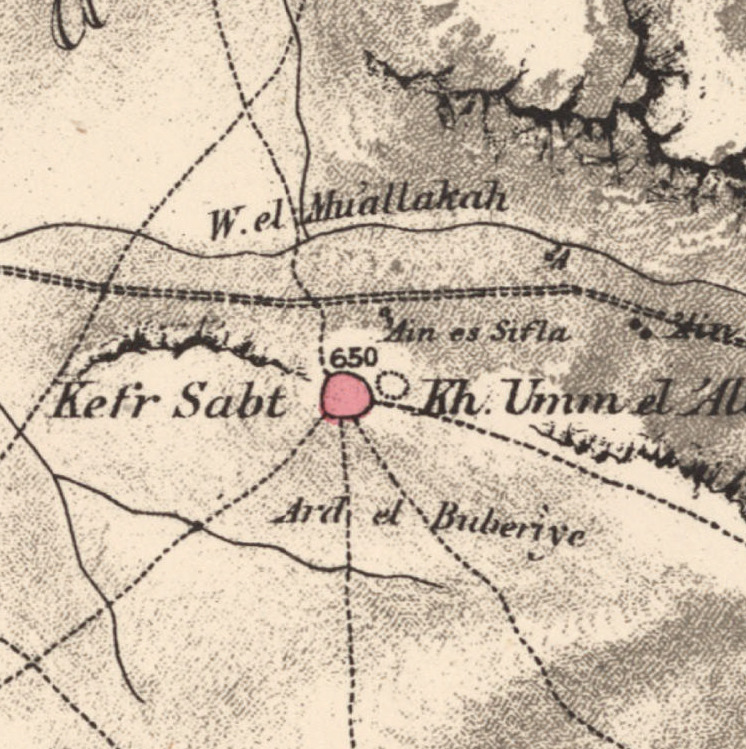
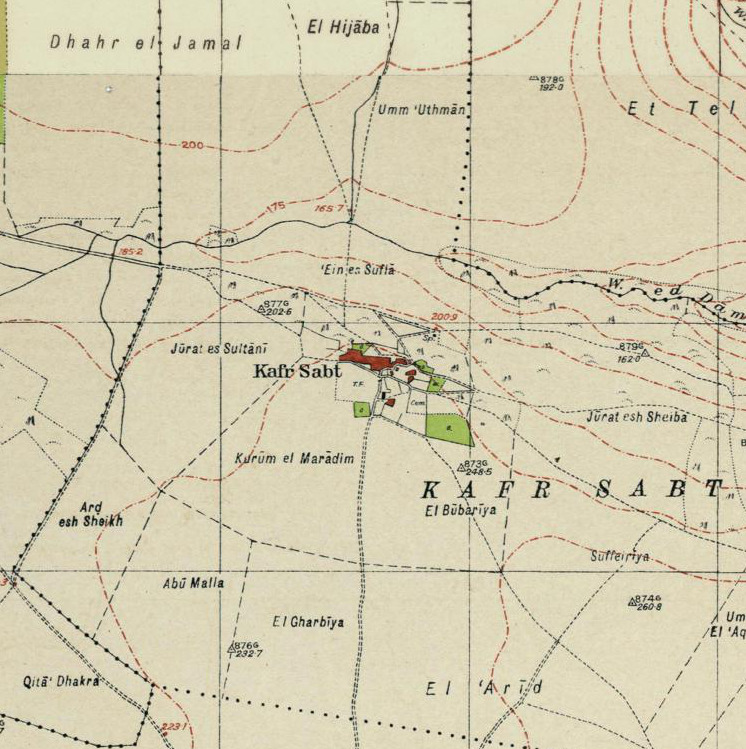
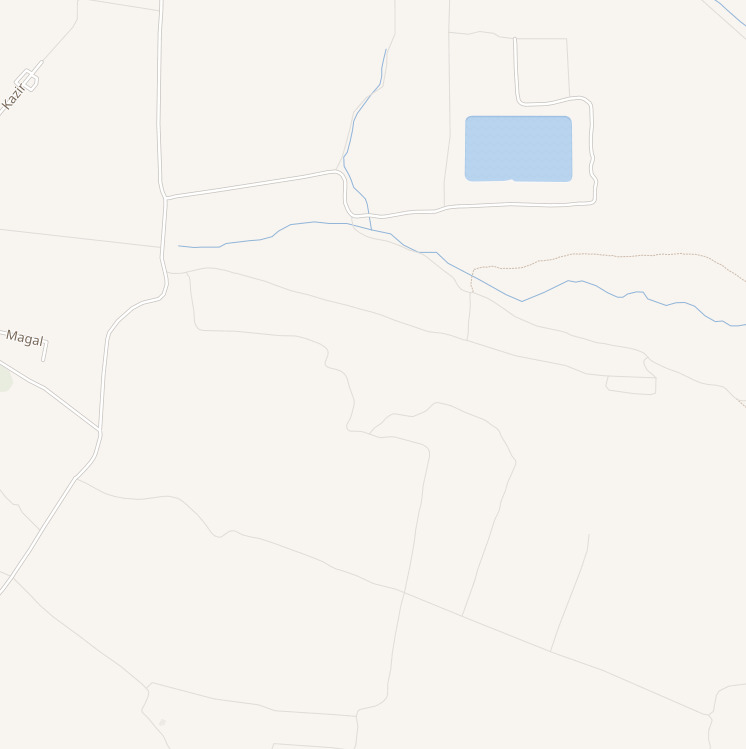
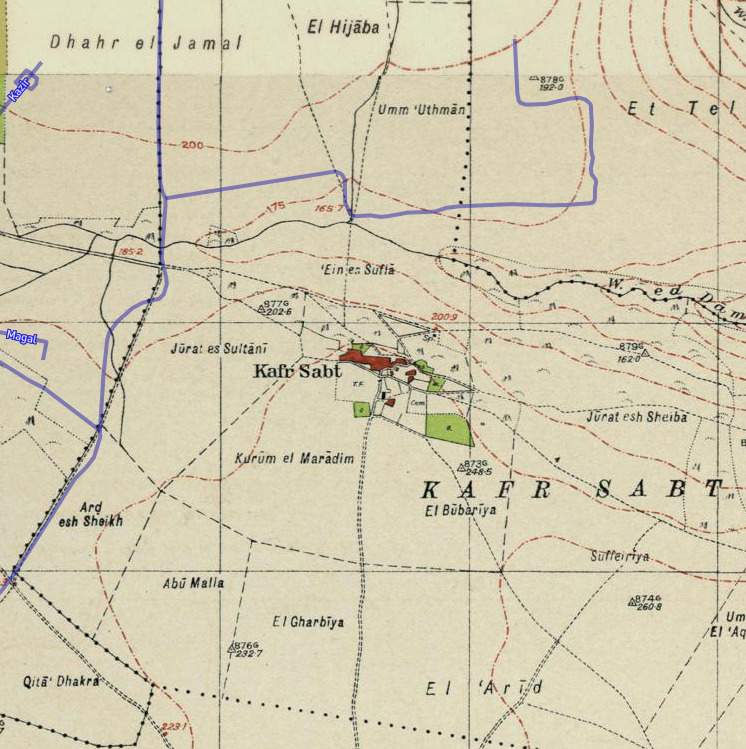
- 1870s map 1940s map modern map 1940s with modern overlay map A series of historical maps of the area around Kafr Sabt (click the buttons)

- Location within Mandatory Palestine
- Coordinates: 32°44′37″N 35°26′27″E
- Palestine grid: 191/238
- Geopolitical entity: Mandatory Palestine
- Subdistrict: Tiberias
- Date of depopulation: April 22, 1948

Area
  - Total: 9,850 dunams (9.85 km^{2}; 3.80 sq mi)

Population (1945)
  - Total: 480
- Cause(s) of depopulation: Influence of nearby town's fall
- Current Localities: Sdeh Ilan, Ilaniya Sharona

Kafr Sabt (Arabic: كفر سبت) was a Palestinian Arab village of nearly 500 situated on a sloping plain in the eastern Lower Galilee located 10.5 kilometers (6.5 mi) southwest of Tiberias. It was depopulated in 1948.

In the late 19th century, Kafr Sabt was settled by Algerian migrants under the auspices of the Ottoman Empire.

== Location, geography ==
Kafr Sabt was set near the eastern margin of a large plateau, just south of the ancient main road linking the coastal city of Acre with the Jordan Valley and Transjordan. The road descends from the village to the Jordan Valley deep below by following Wadi Fidjdjas, a valley offering the least steep route available. Kafr Sabt benefited of the large springs from Wadi Fidjdjas.

== History ==
=== Roman period ===
During the Roman period, Kafr Sabt was known as Kafar Shabtay or Kefar Shobtai, meaning "village of Sabbath". It is mentioned in Genesis Rabbah, a midrash written between 300 and 500 CE: "Beth Ma'on, they ascend to it from Tiberias, but they go down to it from Kefar Shobtai."

=== Early Muslim period ===
Arab geographer al-Muqaddasi mentions the village in 985, while under Abbasid rule as being "between Tiberias and Ramla, situated near 'Akabah (the Pass above) Tiberias. He says that it belonged to Caesarea and was large, populated, and had a mosque on its main street.

=== Crusader/Ayubid period ===
==== Crusader "Cafarsset" ====
The Crusaders called it "Cafarsset" when they conquered the Levant in the twelfth century. The village belonged to the Latin abbey of Mount Tabor and one of the abbey's turcopoles originated from Cafarsset.

In 1187, Saladin led his Ayyubid army from the Jordan River to Kafr Sabt, approximately 8 miles (13 km) from his camp along the Sea of Galilee. Kafr Sabt, located on a high plateau bordering the Horns of Hattin, served as a strategic position for Saladin's army since there he could threaten Tiberias to the rear, Sepphoris in the front, the Crusader lines of communications between the two strongholds, and his army could easily retreat down the slopes if necessary. He encamped in Kafr Sabt before he led his army to their decisive victory at the Battle of Hattin.

==== Ayyubid rule ====
Arab geographer Yaqut al-Hamawi passed through the village in the thirteenth century while Kafr Sabt was in Ayyubid hands.

=== Ottoman period ===
Kafr Sabt was incorporated into the Ottoman Empire in 1517, and by 1596, it was under the administration of the nahiya ("subdistrict") of Tiberias, part of Sanjak Safad, with a population of 29 Muslim households; an estimated 160 persons. The villagers paid a fixed tax rate of 25% on various agricultural products, including wheat, barley, cotton, beehives, and goats; a total of 5,700 akçe.

A map from Napoleon's invasion of 1799 by Pierre Jacotin showed the place, named as K. el Sett.

Victor Guérin visited in 1875, and noted: "Near a spring, inclosed in a small circular basin, the soil is covered with the confused debris of many overthrown houses; some still standing are inhabited. Here and there are scattered cisterns cut in the rock. On the highest point of the hill, formerly occupied by the ancient town, are observed the remains of a strong edifice built of cut stones, which seems to have been put up for military purposes; it formed a quadrilateral forty paces long. Beside a mosque may be remarked two broken capitals in debased Corinthian, as well as several columns belonging probably to an ancient church, now completely destroyed."

In the late 19th century, Kafr Sabt was one of several villages settled by Algerian migrants under the auspices of the Ottoman Empire. The settlers in Kafr Sabt originated in the area of Oued El Berdi and Bouïra.

In 1881, the PEF's Survey of Western Palestine (SWP) described it as a stone-built village with 300 inhabitants.

A population list from about 1887 showed Kefr Sabt to have about 410 inhabitants; all Muslims.

=== British Mandate period ===
Under the British Mandate of Palestine from 1922 to 1948, Kafr Sabt housed members of the Bedouin tribe of 'Arab al-Mashariqa who lived in tents. The village residents were described as migrants from Algeria.

In the 1922 census of Palestine, the population of Kufr Sabt was 247; all Muslims, increasing in the 1931 census to 340; still all Muslims, in a total of 71 houses.

Agriculture was the main economic sector with the primary crops being grain and fruit orchards. In the 1945 statistics, the population reached 480 Muslims, and the total land area owned by Arabs was 4,295 dunams. Of this, 7 dunams were for plantations and irrigable land, 4,258 for cereals, while 30 dunams were built-up land.

=== 1948 and aftermath ===
During the 1948 Arab-Israeli War, Kafr Sabt's inhabitants fled on April 22, as a direct result of the capture of Tiberias, four days before, to the Haganah — the army of Israel. In 1949, two Jewish settlements, Ilaniya and Sharona feuded over possession of Kafr Sabt's lands, with the former arguing that they deserved compensation for early Arab attacks on their town, while the latter also had designs for it, and took it by force. The Agriculture Minister of Israel intervened ordering Sharona's farmers to retreat. According to Palestinian historian Walid Khalidi, as of 1992:

Piles of stone and stone terraces provide the main indications that the village once occupied the site. Cactuses and a few scattered trees grow among the rubble on the village site. The lands around the site are planted in grain, fruit trees, and almond trees.

== Bibliography ==
- Barron, J. B., ed. (1923). Palestine: Report and General Abstracts of the Census of 1922. Government of Palestine.
- Conder, C.R.; Kitchener, H.H. (1881). The Survey of Western Palestine: Memoirs of the Topography, Orography, Hydrography, and Archaeology. Vol. 1. London: Committee of the Palestine Exploration Fund. (p. 367)
- Department of Statistics (1945). Village Statistics, April, 1945. Government of Palestine.
- Guérin, V. (1880). Description Géographique Historique et Archéologique de la Palestine (in French). Vol. 3: Galilee, pt. 1. Paris: L'Imprimerie Nationale.
- Hadawi, S. (1970). Village Statistics of 1945: A Classification of Land and Area ownership in Palestine. Palestine Liberation Organization Research Center.
- Hütteroth, W.-D.; Abdulfattah, K. (1977). Historical Geography of Palestine, Transjordan and Southern Syria in the Late 16th Century. Erlanger Geographische Arbeiten, Sonderband 5. Erlangen, Germany: Vorstand der Fränkischen Geographischen Gesellschaft. ISBN 3-920405-41-2.
- Karmon, Y. (1960). "An Analysis of Jacotin's Map of Palestine" (PDF). Israel Exploration Journal. 10 (3, 4): 155–173, 244–253. Archived from the original (PDF) on 2019-12-22.
- Khalidi, W. (1992). All That Remains: The Palestinian Villages Occupied and Depopulated by Israel in 1948. Washington D.C.: Institute for Palestine Studies. ISBN 0-88728-224-5.
- Lyons, Malcolm Cameron (1984). Saladin: The Politics of the Holy War. Cambridge University Press. ISBN 978-0-521-31739-9.
- Mills, E., ed. (1932). Census of Palestine 1931. Population of Villages, Towns and Administrative Areas. Jerusalem: Government of Palestine.
- Morris, B. (2004). The Birth of the Palestinian Refugee Problem Revisited. Cambridge University Press. ISBN 978-0-521-00967-6.
- Palmer, E.H. (1881). The Survey of Western Palestine: Arabic and English Name Lists Collected During the Survey by Lieutenants Conder and Kitchener, R. E. Transliterated and Explained by E.H. Palmer. Committee of the Palestine Exploration Fund.
- Rhode, H. (1979). Administration and Population of the Sancak of Safed in the Sixteenth Century. Columbia University. Archived from the original on 2020-03-01.
- Schumacher, G. (1888). "Population list of the Liwa of Akka". Quarterly Statement - Palestine Exploration Fund. 20: 169–191.
- Strange, le, G. (1890). Palestine Under the Moslems: A Description of Syria and the Holy Land from A.D. 650 to 1500. Committee of the Palestine Exploration Fund.
