= Degania: The First Kibbutz Fights Its Last Battle =

- Film poster
- Directed by: Yitzhak Rubin
- Produced by: Yitzhak Rubin; Mazal Rubin
- Distributed by: Teknews (Media) Films
- Release date: October 15, 2008 (Haifa International Film Festival)
- Running time: 55 minutes
- Country: Israel
- Language: Hebrew

Degania: The First Kibbutz Fights Its Last Battle (Hebrew: הקרב האחרון על דגניה) is a 2008 Israeli documentary directed by Yitzhak Rubin that premiered at the Haifa International Film Festival.

The film's subject is the bitter dispute over the transition of the first kibbutz, Degania—established in 1910 by a dozen young idealists on the banks of the Jordan River—from a model based on socialism, egalitarianism and mutual responsibility to one of free market capitalism and differential salaries. It follows the emotional and heated debates leading up to the fateful day in March 2007 when kibbutzniks voted on the proposal to privatize their community.

== Reception ==
Rubin's documentary, which was shown at a number of kibbutzim, stimulated profound discussion. Former Knesset member Ran Cohen said that "the film represents both [the] dream and [the] disillusionment" that was the kibbutz experiment.

One Israeli reviewer, Meir Shnitzer, wrote that Rubin's film "is an important document. It is profound testimony highlighting the myth of privatization as every day the stock exchanges around the world expose the bluff. This is an overview of the process through which traditional values in Israeli society are crumbling away."

== See also ==
- Israeli cinema
