= Al-Manshiyya, Tiberias =

Al-Manshiyya المنشية
- Village
- Etymology: From personal name
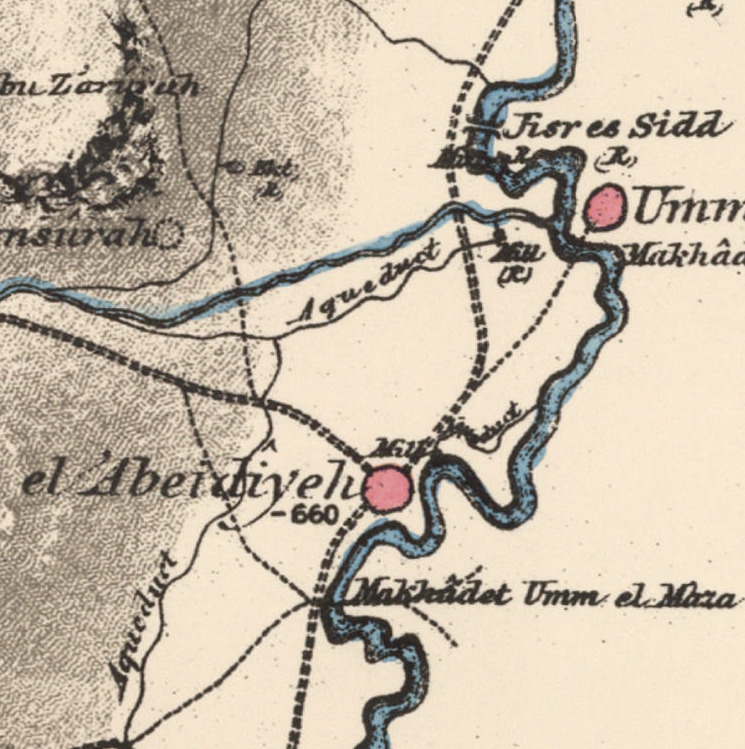
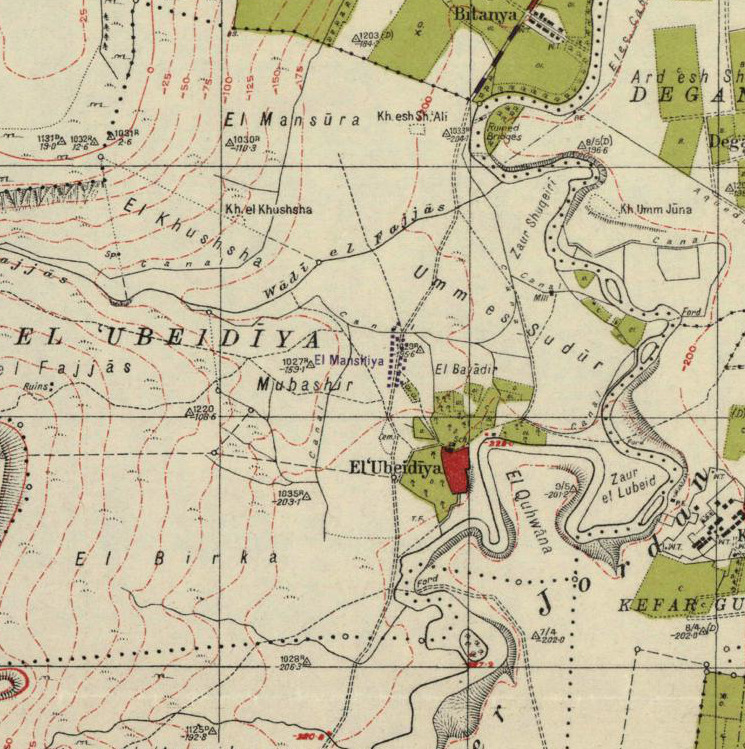
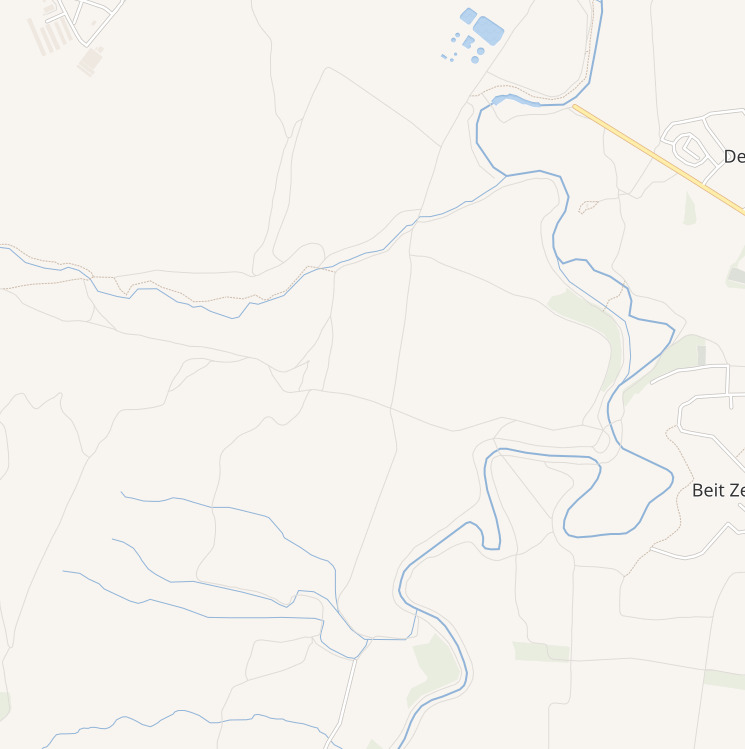
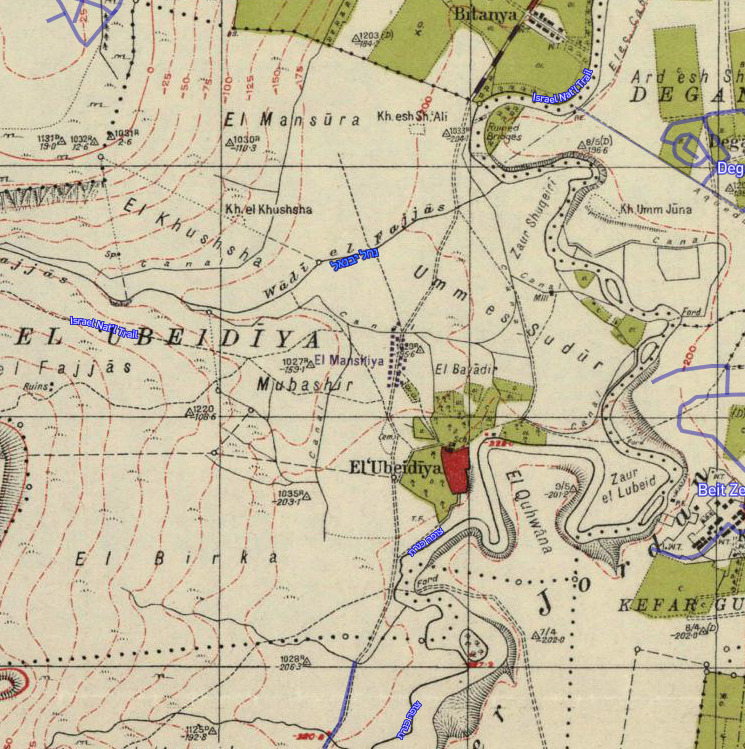
- 1870s map 1940s map modern map 1940s with modern overlay map A series of historical maps of the area around Al-Manshiyya, Tiberias (click the buttons)

- Location within Mandatory Palestine
- Coordinates: 32°41′33″N 35°33′29″E
- Palestine grid: 203/233
- Geopolitical entity: Mandatory Palestine
- Subdistrict: Tiberias
- Date of depopulation: March 3, 1948
- Current Localities: Beit Zera

Al-Manshiyya (Arabic: المنشية) was a Palestinian Arab village in the Tiberias Subdistrict, located 11 kilometres south of Tiberias. It was probably depopulated at the same time as neighbouring Ubeidiya, in the 1947–1948 Civil War in Mandatory Palestine. Manshiyya was located 1 km south-west of Umm Junieh or Khirbat Umm Juni.

== History ==
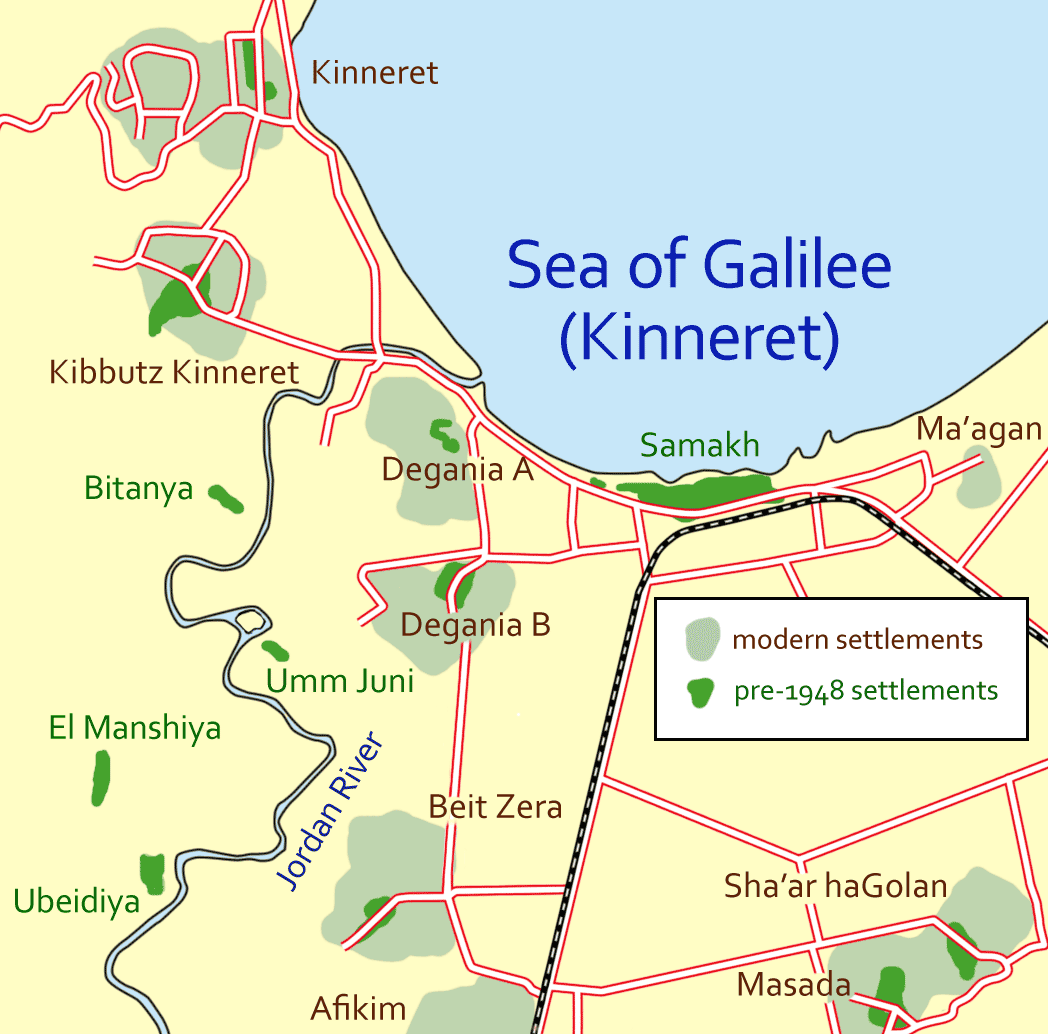
Al-Manshiyya region in historical perspective.

=== Ottoman period ===
In 1799, in the late Ottoman period, Um Junieh was noted as "ruins" on the map of Pierre Jacotin. In 1875, Victor Guérin noted Um Junieh as a village. In the PEF's Survey of Western Palestine in 1881 Umm Junieh was described as having 250 inhabitants, all Muslim. They noted that it was possible that Umm Junieh was the place which Josephus called Union.

In the 1880s the land of Khirbat Umm Juni and Al-Manshiyya was bought on behalf of the Bahá'u'lláh, the founder of the Baháʼí Faith. The Arab inhabitants continued to farm the land as tenant farmers.

A population list from about 1887 showed that Kiryet Umm Juny had about 330 Muslim inhabitants.

==== Degania ====
In 1905-1907 the land was resold to the Jewish National Fund. What were to become Kibbutz Degania was established at Umm Juni, in part using existing Arab-made mud huts and for a while the Arab village and the Jewish one coexisted.

=== British Mandate era ===
In the 1922 census of Palestine, there were 79 Muslim residents in Khirbat Umm Juneh, while no number is available for Al-Manshiyya.

=== Post 1948 ===
In 1992 the village site was described: "The site is covered with grasses and a few palm and eucalyptus trees; no traces of buildings remain. The surrounding lands are cultivated by Israelis."

== See also ==
- Degania Alef, the "mother of all kibbutzim", was established at Umm Junieh in 1909

== Bibliography ==
- Barron, J. B., ed. (1923). Palestine: Report and General Abstracts of the Census of 1922. Government of Palestine.
- Conder, C.R.; Kitchener, H. H. (1881). The Survey of Western Palestine: Memoirs of the Topography, Orography, Hydrography, and Archaeology. Vol. 1. London: Committee of the Palestine Exploration Fund. (Kh. Um Juni p. 371)
- Guérin, V. (1880). Description Géographique Historique et Archéologique de la Palestine (in French). Vol. 3: Galilee, pt. 1. Paris: L'Imprimerie Nationale.
- Hadawi, S. (1970). Village Statistics of 1945: A Classification of Land and Area ownership in Palestine. Palestine Liberation Organization Research Centre. Archived from the original on 2018-12-08.
- Karmon, Y. (1960). "An Analysis of Jacotin's Map of Palestine" (PDF). Israel Exploration Journal. 10 (3, 4): 155–173, 244–253. Archived from the original (PDF) on 2017-12-01.
- Khalidi, W. (1992). All That Remains: The Palestinian Villages Occupied and Depopulated by Israel in 1948. Washington D.C.: Institute for Palestine Studies. ISBN 0-88728-224-5.
- Morris, B. (2004). The Birth of the Palestinian Refugee Problem Revisited. Cambridge University Press. ISBN 978-0-521-00967-6.
- Palmer, E. H. (1881). The Survey of Western Palestine: Arabic and English Name Lists Collected During the Survey by Lieutenants Conder and Kitchener, R. E. Transliterated and Explained by E.H. Palmer. Committee of the Palestine Exploration Fund.
- Schumacher, G. (1888). "Population list of the Liwa of Akka". Quarterly Statement - Palestine Exploration Fund. 20: 169–191.
