= Yosef Baratz =

Israeli politician

- יוסף ברץ
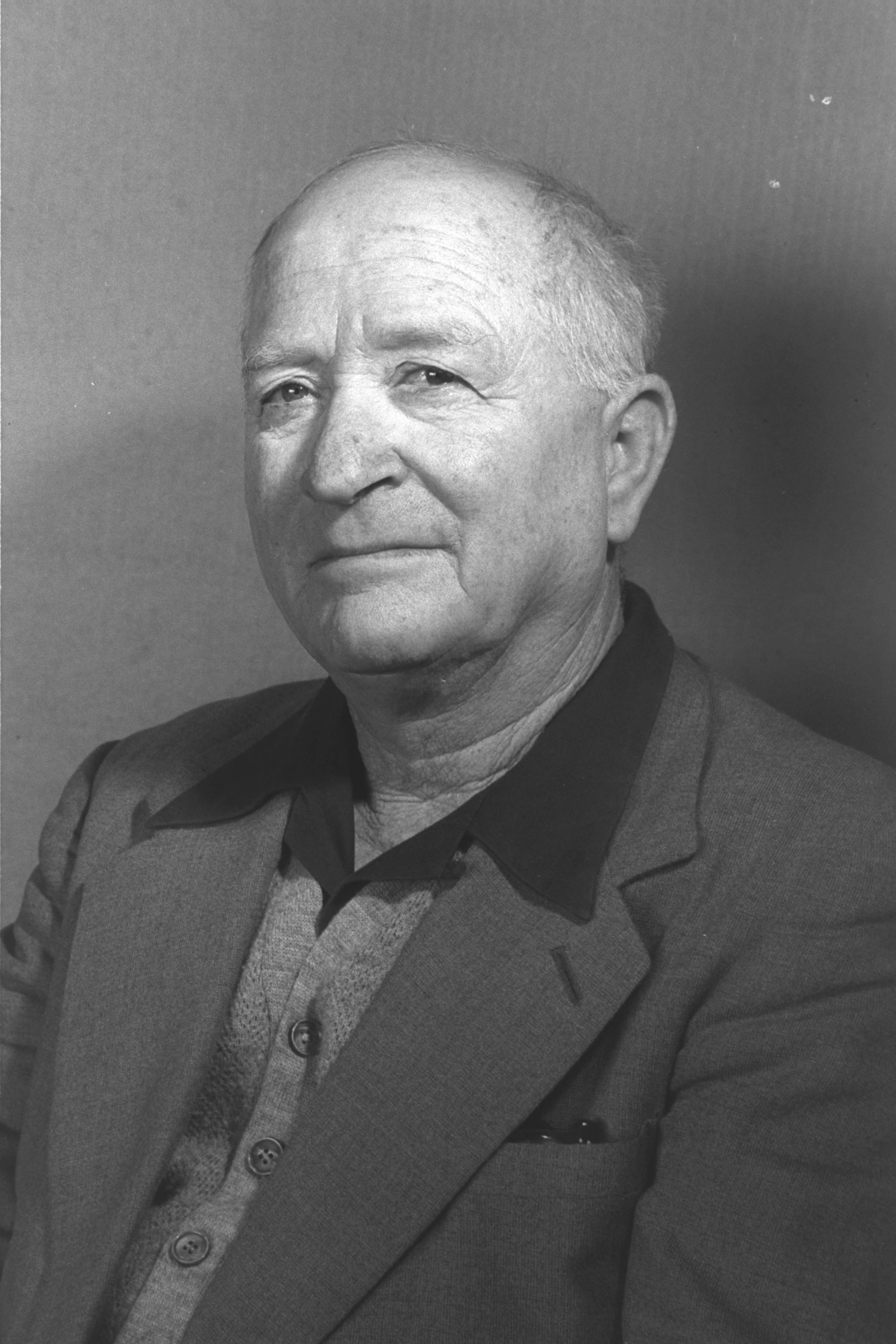
- Baratz in 1956

Faction represented in the Knesset
- 1949–1951: Mapai

Personal details
- Born: 8 May 1890 Coșnița, Russian Empire
- Died: 14 December 1968 (aged 78) Degania Alef, Israel

Yosef Baratz (Hebrew: יוסף ברץ; 8 May 1890 – 14 December 1968) was a Zionist activist and Israeli politician.

== Biography ==
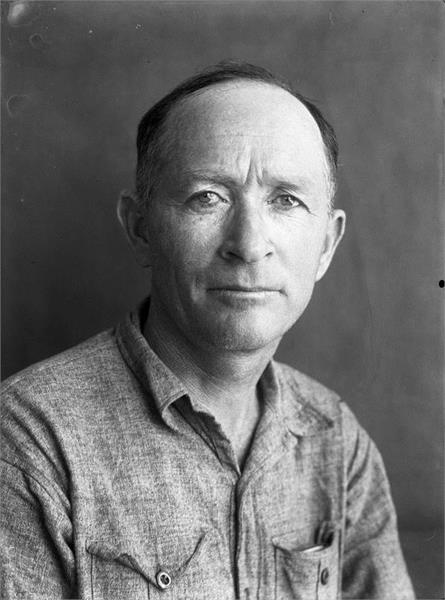
Baratz in 1935

Born in Coșnița, a village in Kherson Governorate in the Russian Empire (today in the Dubăsari District of Moldova), Baratz was educated at a heder and joined the Young Zion movement in Chișinău. He immigrated to Ottoman-controlled Palestine in 1906 and worked in agriculture in Petah Tikva and Rehovot, and as a stone cutter in Jerusalem, Tel Aviv, Atlit and Zikhron Ya'akov. In 1920, Baratz was also amongst the early members of Degania Alef, the first kibbutz.

Baratz was also sent abroad as an emissary, to Russia in 1919, the United States in 1921 and Austria in 1934. He became a member of the central committee of the Haganah and was also a member of the Assembly of Representatives. Baratz served in the British Army during World War II. In 1949 he was elected to the first Knesset on the Mapai list but lost his seat in the 1951 elections. He died in 1968 at the age of 78.

Streets in Petah Tikva, Holon, Bat Yam and Tiberias are named after him.
