= Allon Road =

Road in the West Bank

Coordinates: 32°05′26″N 35°22′47″E

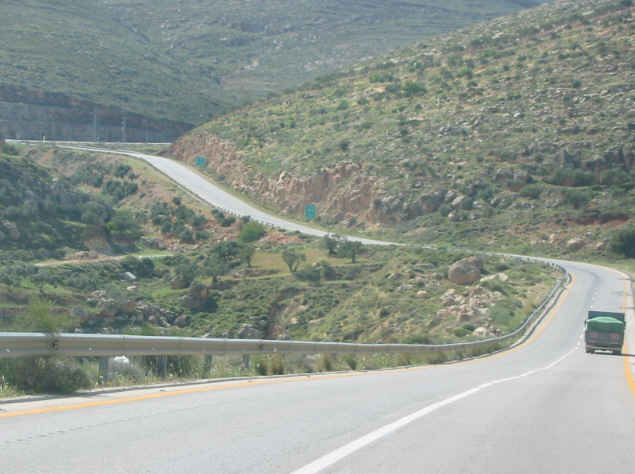
- Allon Road near the intersection of Routes 508 and 458, south of Migdalim

Route information
- Length: 88 km (55 mi)

Major junctions
- South end: Kfar Adumim Junction
- North end: Mehola Junction

Location
- Country: Israel

Highway system
- Roads in Israel; Highways
← Route 457	Route 458	→ Route 461
← Route 505	Route 508	→ Route 531
← Route 574	Route 578	→ Route 581

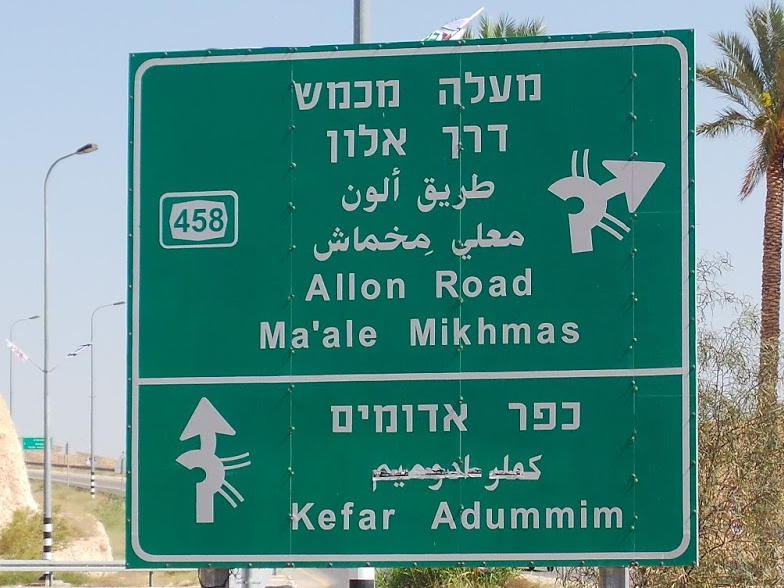
A road sign indicating the way to the Alon Road

Allon Road is the name given by Israel to Routes 458, 508, and 578 in the West Bank, running roughly south–north along the eastern watershed of the Judaean and Samarian Hills, between Highway 1 near Kfar Adumim east of Jerusalem and Highway 90 at Mehola in the central Jordan Valley.

== History ==
Allon Plan map

The road was the first step in implementing the Allon Plan, one of the earliest Israeli initiatives to deal with the territory west of Jordan that was occupied in the 1967 Six-Day War. The plan called for the Israeli annexation of the narrow corridor of land along the west of the Jordan River up to the eastern slopes of the Samarian mountains to assure minimal strategical depth while relinquishing the rest of the West Bank to Arab-Jordanian control.

The next step was to establish residential and agricultural settlements as well as military outposts along this strip of land to assure a minimal buffer zone that would hold up in the event of a Jordanian attack until Israeli Army reserve units could mobilize to the area. Between 1967 and 1977, the Israeli Labor Party governments created 21 settlements in this area, mostly agricultural cooperatives.

The effects of this plan can be easily seen from the fact that almost all the settlements on the Allon Road (E.g.: Alon, Rimonim, Gitit) are on the east side.

== Junctions (South to North) ==
District	Location	km	mi	Name	Destinations	Notes
Route 458
Judea and Samaria	Kfar Adumim	0	0.0	צומת כפר אדומים (Kfar Adumim Junction)	Highway 1	
Judea and Samaria	Alon	3	1.9	צומת ללא שם (Unnamed Junction)	Access road to Kfar Adumim; Entrance to Alon	
Judea and Samaria	Ma'ale Mikhmas	13	8.1	צומת מכמש קטן (Small Mikhmas Junction)	Entrance road	
Judea and Samaria	Ma'ale Mikhmas	15	9.3	צומת מכור (Makhur Junction)	Route 457	
Judea and Samaria	Rimonim	19	12	צומת רימונים (Rimonim Junction)	Route 449	Southern end of concurrency with Route 449
Judea and Samaria	Rimonim	21	13	צומת רימונים קטן (Small Rimonim Junction)	Entrance to Rimonim	
Judea and Samaria	Kokhav HaShahar	24	15	צומת מעלה שלמה (Ma'ale Shlomo Junction)	Route 449	Northern end of concurrency with Route 449
Judea and Samaria	Kokhav HaShahar	25	16	צומת כוכב השחר (Kokhav HaShahar Junction)	Entrance to Kokhav HaShahar	
Judea and Samaria	Al-Mughayyir	33	21	צומת אל מוע'ייר (Al-Mughayyir Junction)	Entrance to Al-Mughayyir	
Judea and Samaria	Malakhei HaShalom	34	21	צומת מלאכי השלום (Malakhei HaShalom Junction)	Entrance to Israeli outpost Malakhei HaShalom	
Judea and Samaria	Yishuv HaDa'at; Keida	36	22	צומת גדעון (Gideon Junction)	Road 5055	
Judea and Samaria	Duma	39	24	צומת דומא (Duma Junction)	Entrance to Duma	
Judea and Samaria	Majdal Bani Fadil	40	25	צומת אלון (Allon Junction)	Route 505	Western end of concurrency with Route 505
Route 508
Judea and Samaria	Gitit; Ma'ale Efrayim	44.5	27.7	צומת מעלה אפרים (Ma'ale Efrayim Junction)	Route 505	Eastern end of concurrency with Route 505
Judea and Samaria	Gitit	46	29	צומת גיתית (Gitit Junction)	Entrance to Gitit	
Judea and Samaria	Mekhora	57	35	צומת מכורה (Mekhora Junction)	Entrance to Mekhora	
Judea and Samaria	Hamra	63	39	צומת חמרה (Hamara Junction)	Highway 57	Southern end of concurrency with Highway 57
Route 578
Judea and Samaria	Hamra	64.5	40.1	צומת בקעות (Beka'ot Junction)	Highway 57	Northern end of concurrency with Highway 57
Judea and Samaria	Beka'ot	68.5	42.6	צומת ליד בקעות (Junction near Beka'ot)	Entrance to Beka'ot	
Judea and Samaria	Ro'i	72	45	צומת רועי (Ro'i Junction)	Entrance to Ro'i	
Judea and Samaria	Hemdat	75	47	צומת חמדת (Hemdat Junction)	Entrance to Hemdat	
Judea and Samaria	Hemdat	76	47	צומת חמדת (Hemdat Junction)	Road 5788	
Judea and Samaria	Maskiot	82	51	צומת משכיות (Maskiot Junction)	Entrance to Maskiot	
Judea and Samaria	Maskiot	83	52	צומת משכיות (Maskiot Junction)	Road 5799	
Judea and Samaria	Rotem	85	53	צומת רותם (Rotem Junction)	Entrance to Rotem	
Judea and Samaria	Mehola	88	55	צומת מחולה (Mehola Junction)	Highway 90	
1.000 mi = 1.609 km; 1.000 km = 0.621 mi: Concurrency terminus

== See also ==
- List of highways in Israel
