= Route 505 (Israel–Palestine) =

Road in Israel

Route 505
- כביש 505
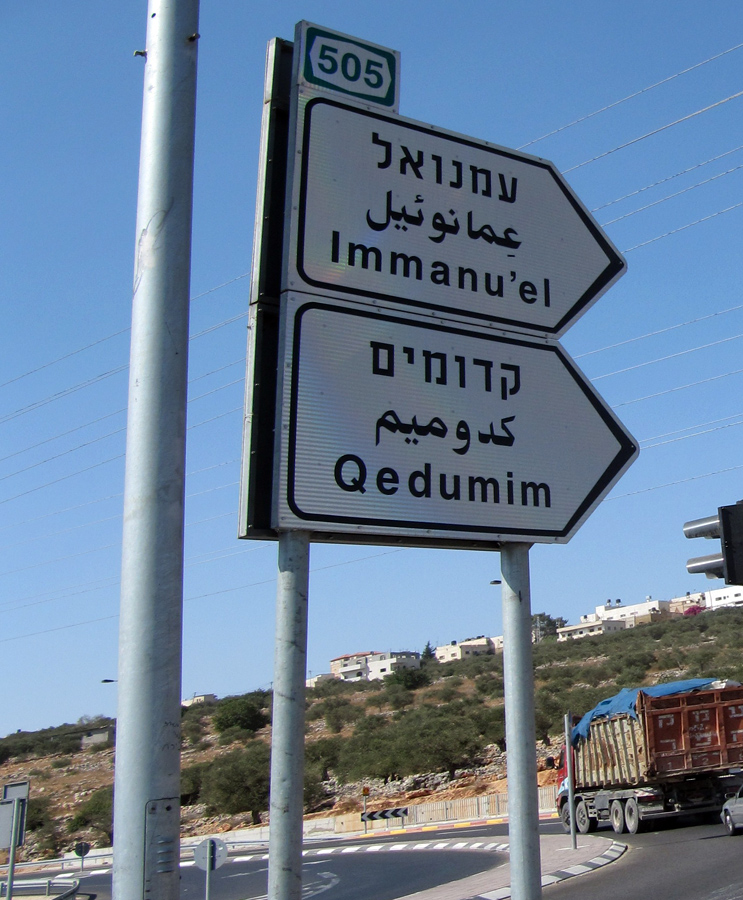

Route information
- Length: 56.5 km (35.1 mi)

Major junctions
- West end: Samaria Gate Interchange
- East end: Petza'el Junction

Location
- Country: Israel

Highway system
- Roads in Israel; Highways
← Route 491	→ Route 508

Route 505 is a regional Israeli highway in the West Bank.

== History ==
Until the 1990s, only Route 505 was considered the "Trans-Samaria Highway". Highway 5, which hadn't yet been upgraded to a highway, was a narrow, curved two-lane road that reached the Kassem junction and continued as a minimal two-lane road for 2 kilometres (1.2 mi) to the entrance to Kfar Kassem. At this point, the road (today's Highway 5) connected to the old Route 505, which crossed Kfar Kassem.

An early improvement was to extend and pave Route 5 along an additional 5 kilometres (3.1 mi) as a bypass road, which ended where the Sha'ar Shomron Interchange exists now. Eastward beyond that, the Trans-Samaria Highway was only Route 505. During the late 1990s and during the 2000s the National Roads Company of Israel continued to develop Route 5 as a two-lane highway in a new route south of Route 505 instead of upgrading the 505 route so that the two highways were parallel for a distance of about 14 kilometres (8.7 mi). Since November 2008, route 5 has ended at the Ariel junction, where it connects with Route 505 which continues as the "Trans-Samaria Highway" to the intersection with Highway 90 in the Petza'el intersection in the Jordan Valley.

In 2010 Minister of Transportation Yisrael Katz ordered the planning for the route to connect the Gush Dan region with the Jordan Valley.

== Interchanges and Junctions (West to East) ==
District	Location	km	mi	Name	Destinations	Notes
Judea and Samaria	Oranit; Elkana	0	0.0	מחלף שער שומרון (Samaria Gate Interchange)	Highway 5	
Judea and Samaria	Sha'arei Tikva	1.7	1.1	צומת אורנית (Oranit Junction)	Road 5050	
Judea and Samaria	Sha'arei Tikva	3	1.9	צומת שערי תקווה (Sha'arei Tikva Junction)	Inbar Street	
Judea and Samaria	Elkana	3.8	2.4	צומת אלקנה (Elkana Junction)	Adnei Paz Road	
Judea and Samaria	Elkana	4.1	2.5	צומת אלקנה (Elkana Junction)	Smadar Street	
Highway 505 between Elkana and Kiryat Netafim (5.5 km) is open only to residents of the local villages
Judea and Samaria	Kiryat Netafim	12	7.5	צומת קריית נטפים (Kiryat Netafim Junction)	Entrance to Kiryat Netafim	
Judea and Samaria	Barkan	12.1	7.5	צומת יקיר גדול (Yakir Gadol Junction)	Entrance to Barkan Industrial Park	
Judea and Samaria	Revava; Haris	13.5	8.4	צומת יקיר קטן (Yakir Katan Junction)	Road 5066	
Judea and Samaria	Revava; Haris	14.5	9.0	צומת גיתי (Gitai Junction)	Highway 5	Western end of concurrency with Highway 5
Judea and Samaria	Ariel; Kifl Haris	17	11	צומת אריאל (Ariel Junction)	Highway 5 Road 4775	Eastern end of concurrency with Highway 5
Judea and Samaria	Kfar Tapuach	26.4	16.4	צומת תפוח (Tapuach Junction)	Highway 60; Road 4775	
Judea and Samaria	Migdalim	37	23	צומת מגדלים (Migdalim Junction)	Road 5077	
Judea and Samaria	Majdal Bani Fadil	39	24	צומת אלון (Allon Junction)	Route 458	Western end of concurrency with Allon Road
Judea and Samaria	Gitit; Ma'ale Efrayim	43.5	27.0	צומת מעלה אפרים (Ma'ale Efrayim Junction)	Route 508	Eastern end of concurrency with Allon Road
Judea and Samaria	Ma'ale Efrayim	47	29	מסעף מעלה אפרים (Ma'ale Efrayim Branch)	Bnei Efraim Street	
Judea and Samaria	Petza'el	55	34	מסעף פצאל (Petza'el Branch)	Road 5085	
Judea and Samaria	Petza'el	56.5	35.1	צומת פצאל (Petza'el Junction)	Highway 90	
1.000 mi = 1.609 km; 1.000 km = 0.621 mi: Concurrency terminus

== See also ==
- List of highways in Israel
