= List of Israeli highways =

This is a list of Israeli highways. Besides highways in Israel proper, it includes highways in the West Bank and the Golan Heights because the Israeli administration maintains them in these areas.

There are 48 designated Israeli highways. Most of these are open-access arterial expressways, which may be entered from ordinary junctions. Some are limited-access freeways, which may be entered from interchanges. Six highways are freeways, six are partially limited-access freeways and partially expressways, and the other 35 are expressways. There is only one three-digit road in the country classified as a freeway, Route 431. Highway 6, the Trans-Israel Highway (or the Yitzhak Rabin Highway (for most of its route), is the only toll road.

Two of the expressways (Highway 57 and Highway 60) are divided into several separate sections as a result of an IDF decree forbidding Israelis from travelling on certain stretches of these highways (see Notes below).

== 1–99 ==
Number	Length (km)	Length (mi)	Southern or western terminus	Northern or eastern terminus	Formed	Removed	Notes
Highway 1	94	58	Tel Aviv	Beit HaArava	—	—	
Highway 2	90	56	Hatikva	Haifa	1950	current	
Highway 3	47	29	Ashkelon	Mevo Horon	1937	current	
Highway 4	201	125	Erez Crossing	Rosh HaNikra Crossing	—	—	
Highway 5	40	25	Tel Aviv	Ariel	1965	current	
Highway 6	180	110	Tel Shoket	Shlomi	2002	current	
Highway 7	13.64	8.48	Ashdod	Yad Binyamin	2004	current	
Highway 9	11.69	7.26	Hefer Valley	Baqa al-Gharbiyye	2014	current	
Highway 10	192.51	119.62	Sayarim Valley	Kerem Shalom	1986	current	
Highway 12	71	44	Eilat	Neot Smadar	1965	current	
Highway 13	11.38	7.07	Tzihor Stream	Menuha Stream	—	—	
Highway 16	5.26	3.27	Motza	Givat Mordechai	2022	current	
Highway 20	34.6	21.5	Gan Sorek	Ga'ash	1982	current	
Highway 22	16.79	10.43	Haifa	Kfar Masaryk	2005	current	
Highway 23	9.23	5.74	Haifa	Port of Haifa	2010	current	
Highway 25	113	70	Nahal Oz	Aravah	1939	current	
Highway 31	60.5	37.6	Lakiya	Neve Zohar	1963	current	
Highway 34	19.75	12.27	Netivot	Yad Mordechai	—	—	
Highway 35	55	34	Ashkelon	Hebron	—	—	
Highway 38	29	18	Bet Guvrin	Sha'ar HaGai	1963	current	
Highway 39	25	16	Nir Banim	Jerusalem	proposed	—	
Highway 40	294	183	Lotan	Kfar Saba	—	—	
Highway 41	4.87	3.03	Port of Ashdod	Ashdod	—	—	
Highway 42	18	11	Ashdod	Rishon LeZion	—	—	
Highway 44	41.1	25.5	Eshtaol	Holon	—	—	
Highway 45	4.53	2.81	Giv'at Ze'ev	Atarot	2002	current	
Highway 46	3.67	2.28	Ben Gurion International Airport	Tirat Yehuda	—	—	
Highway 50	15.68	9.74	Gilo	Atarot	1998	current	
Highway 55	25.5	15.8	Neve Yamin	Jit	1935	current	
Highway 57	15	9.3	Netanya	Nitzanei Oz	—	—	Western Section
Highway 57	7	4.3	Einav	Deir Sharaf	—	—	Central Section
Highway 57	15	9.3	Hamra	Adam Bridge	—	—	Eastern Section
Highway 60	100	62	Beersheba	Qalandia checkpoint	—	—	Southern Section
Highway 60	90	56	Geva Binyamin	Tel Dothan	—	—	Central Section
Highway 60	24	15	Jalamah checkpoint	Nazareth	—	—	Northern Section
Highway 61	1.65	1.03	Maor	Baqa al-Gharbiyye	—	2014	Replaced by Highway 9
Highway 65	90	56	Hadera	Kadarim	1933	current	
Highway 66	18	11	Ma'ale Iron	Yokneam Illit	1929	current	
Highway 67	13	8.1	Zikhron Ya'akov	Ramot Menashe	2018	current	
Highway 70	44	27	Yagur	Shlomi	1935	current	
Highway 71	31	19	Afula	Jordan River Crossing	1937	current	
Highway 73	11.6	7.2	Nahalal	Tel Adashim	1930	current	
Highway 75	41	25	Haifa	Nazareth	1922	current	
Highway 77	48	30	Kiryat Tiv'on	Tiberias	—	—	
Highway 79	27	17	Kiryat Bialik	Mashhad	—	—	
Highway 80	34	21	Ar'ara BaNegev	Beit Yatir	—	—	
Highway 85	47	29	Akko	Amiad	1957	current	
Highway 87	35	22	Kfar Nahum	Givat Pazra	1972	current	
Highway 89	58	36	Nahariya	Elifelet	1916	current	
Highway 90	478.7	297.5	Taba Border Crossing	Metula	1981	current	
Highway 91	29.71	18.46	Mahanayim	Ein Zivan	—	—	
Highway 92	26	16	Samakh	Bethsaida Valley	1950	current	
Highway 98	99	62	Ma'agan	Mount Hermon ski resort	—	—	
Highway 99	24	15	Kiryat Shmona	Masade	—	—	
1.000 mi = 1.609 km; 1.000 km = 0.621 mi: Former; Proposed and unbuilt

== 100–999 ==
Number	Length (km)	Length (mi)	Southern or western terminus	Northern or eastern terminus	Formed	Removed	Notes
Route 109	1.34	0.83	Eilot	Yitzhak Rabin Crossing	1994	current	
Route 171	33	21	Har Harif	Mitzpe Ramon	—	—	
Route 200	3.27	2.03	Ramla	Ramla	2020	current	
Route 204	30.4	18.9	Sde Boker	Dimona	1953	current	
Route 206	16.4	10.2	Oron Industrial Park	Rotem Factories	—	—	
Route 211	41	25	Nitzana Border Crossing	Tlalim	—	—	
Route 222	46	29	Mashabei Sadeh	Ein HaBesor	1951	current	
Route 224	12	7.5	Camp Ariel Sharon	Yeruham	1941	current	
Route 225	—	—	—	—	—	—	
Route 227	33	21	Mishor Yamin	Idan	1950	current	
Route 232	81.4	50.6	Kerem Shalom border crossing	Nitzanim	—	—	
Route 234	23.5	14.6	Tze'elim	Re'im	—	—	
Route 240	—	—	—	—	—	—	
Route 241	—	—	—	—	—	—	
Route 242	—	—	—	—	—	—	
Route 258	—	—	—	—	—	—	
Route 264	14.5	9.0	Eshel HaNasi	Beit Kama	1949	current	
Route 293	18.5	11.5	Netivot	Beit Kama	—	—	
Route 310	—	—	—	—	—	—	
Route 316	—	—	—	—	—	—	
Route 317	—	—	—	—	—	—	See Horvat Maon (Hebron Hills)
Route 325	—	—	—	—	—	—	
Route 333	2.51	1.56	Har Hamenuchot	Givat Shaul	2007	current	
Route 334	—	—	—	—	—	—	
Route 352	—	—	—	—	—	—	
Route 353	—	—	—	—	—	—	
Route 354	—	—	—	—	—	—	
Route 356	—	—	—	—	—	—	
Route 358	—	—	—	—	—	—	
Route 367	—	—	—	—	—	—	
Route 375	—	—	—	—	—	—	
Route 383	—	—	—	—	—	—	
Route 386	23	14	Tzur Hadassah	Romema	1953	current	
Route 395	—	—	—	—	—	—	
Route 396	—	—	—	—	—	—	
Route 398	—	—	—	—	—	—	
Route 402	—	—	—	—	—	—	
Route 404	11.11	6.90	Givat Mordechai	Atarot	1998	2012	Replaced by Highway 50
Route 406	—	—	—	—	—	—	
Route 410	—	—	—	—	—	—	
Route 411	21	13	Rehovot	Tal Shahar	1939	current	
Route 412	22	14	Kfar Bilu	Yehud	1931	current	
Route 415	—	—	—	—	—	—	
Route 417	16	9.9	Romema	Ma'ale Adumim	—	—	
Route 423	—	—	—	—	—	—	
Route 424	—	—	—	—	—	—	
Route 425	—	—	—	—	—	—	
Route 431	27.6	17.1	Rishon LeTzion	Modi'in	2009	current	
Route 436	13.2	8.2	Sanhedriya	Beitunia	—	—	
Route 437	—	—	—	—	—	—	
Route 441	—	—	—	—	—	—	
Route 443	28.3	17.6	Lod	Giv'at Ze'ev	—	—	
Route 444	—	—	—	—	—	—	
Route 446	31	19	Modi'in	Brukhin	—	—	
Route 449	—	—	—	—	—	—	
Route 450	—	—	—	—	—	—	
Route 453	—	—	—	—	—	—	
Route 457	—	—	—	—	—	—	
Route 458	40	25	Kfar Adumim	Majdal Bani Fadil	1974	current	Part of the Allon Road
Route 461	—	—	—	—	—	—	
Route 463	—	—	—	—	—	—	
Route 465	—	—	—	—	—	—	
Route 466	—	—	—	—	—	—	
Route 471	10.3	6.4	Ramat Gan	Nahshonim	2002	current	
Route 481	—	—	—	—	—	—	
Route 482	—	—	—	—	—	—	
Route 483	—	—	—	—	—	—	
Route 491	—	—	—	—	—	—	
Route 505	56.5	35.1	Oranit; Elkana	Petza'el	1975	current	
Route 508	18.5	11.5	Gitit; Ma'ale Ephraim	Hamra	1974	current	Part of the Allon Road
Route 531	15.2	9.4	Rishpon	Horshim	2016	current	
Route 541	10.26	6.38	Herzliya	Ra'anana	—	—	
Route 551	—	—	—	—	—	—	
Route 553	—	—	—	—	—	—	
Route 555	—	—	—	—	—	—	
Route 557	—	—	—	—	—	—	
Route 574	—	—	—	—	—	—	
Route 578	23.5	14.6	Hamra	Mehola	1974	current	Part of the Allon Road
Route 581	—	—	—	—	—	—	
Route 584	—	—	—	—	—	—	
Route 585	—	—	—	—	—	—	
Route 650	—	—	—	—	—	—	
Route 651	—	—	—	—	—	—	
Route 652	—	—	—	—	—	—	
Route 653	—	—	—	—	—	—	
Route 654	—	—	—	—	—	—	
Route 667	—	—	—	—	—	—	
Route 669	—	—	—	—	—	—	
Route 672	—	—	—	—	—	—	
Route 675	12	7.5	Nir Yafe	Kfar Yehezkel	—	—	
Route 716	—	—	—	—	—	—	
Route 717	—	—	—	—	—	—	
Route 721	—	—	—	—	—	—	
Route 752	—	—	—	—	—	—	
Route 762	—	—	—	—	—	—	
Route 767	—	—	—	—	—	—	
Route 768	—	—	—	—	—	—	
Route 772	—	—	—	—	—	—	
Route 780	—	—	—	—	—	—	
Route 781	—	—	—	—	—	—	
Route 784	26	16	Alon HaGalil	Karmiel	1967	current	
Route 789	—	—	—	—	—	—	
Route 804	—	—	—	—	—	—	
Route 805	—	—	—	—	—	—	
Route 806	—	—	—	—	—	—	
Route 807	—	—	—	—	—	—	
Route 808	—	—	—	—	—	—	
Route 854	—	—	—	—	—	—	
Route 859	—	—	—	—	—	—	
Route 864	13.8	8.6	Rameh	Hosen	—	—	
Route 866	11.4	7.1	Kfar Hananya	Meron	1932	current	
Route 869	—	—	—	—	—	—	
Route 886	39.5	24.5	Ein Zeitim	Misgav Am	1932	current	
Route 888	13	8.1	Bethsaida	Customs Office	—	—	
Route 899	63	39	Betzet	Hula Valley	1937	current	
Route 918	27	17	Gadot	Hurshat Tal	1958	current	
Route 959	17.5	10.9	Gonen	Merom Golan	—	—	
Route 977	7	4.3	Ein Bedolah Nature Reserve	Lehavot HaBashan	—	—	
Route 978	21	13	Ruins of Kafr Naffakh	Mas'ade	—	—	
Route 989	11	6.8	Sa'ar	Majdal Shams	1973	current	
Route 999	29	18	Snir	Mount Hermon	—	—	
1.000 mi = 1.609 km; 1.000 km = 0.621 mi: Former

== 1000–9999 ==
- Road 4370

== See also ==
- List of junctions and interchanges in Israel
- Roads in Israel
