= Ma'ale =

Ma'ale or Ma'aleh (Hebrew: מעלה, Arabic: معالي. Arabic: معاليه) is the name of several places in Israel and Palestine. It may refer to:

== Inhabited places ==
- Ma'ale Adumim, Israeli settlement and a city in the West Bank;
- Ma'ale Amos, Haredi community Israeli settlement in the southern West Bank;
- Ma'ale Efrayim, Israeli settlement and local council located along the eastern slopes of the Samarian mountains in the Jordan Valley;
- Ma'ale Gamla, Israeli settlement and moshav located in the west part of the Golan Heights;
- Ma'ale Gilboa, kibbutz located on the summit of Mount Gilboa;
- Ma'ale HaHamisha, kibbutz in central Israel;
- Ma'ale HaShalom, street in Jerusalem;
- Ma'ale HaZeitim, Israeli settlement on the Mount of Olives in East Jerusalem;
- Ma'ale Hever, Israeli settlement in the West Bank;
- Ma'ale Iron, Israeli Arab local council in Haifa District;
- Ma'ale Levona, Israeli settlement in the West Bank;
- Ma'ale Mikhmas, Israeli settlement in the Binyamin region of the northern West Bank;
- Ma'ale Rehav'am, Israeli settlement outpost in the West Bank;
- Ma'ale Shlomo, Israeli outpost in the West Bank;
- Ma'ale Shomron, Israeli settlement in the northern West Bank;
- Ma'ale Tzviya, community settlement in northern Israel;
- Ma'ale Yosef, regional council in the Upper Galilee, part of the Northern District.

== Other ==
- Ma'aleh School of Television, Film and the Arts
