= Highway 57 (Israel–Palestine) =

Highway in Israel

Highway 57
- כביש 57
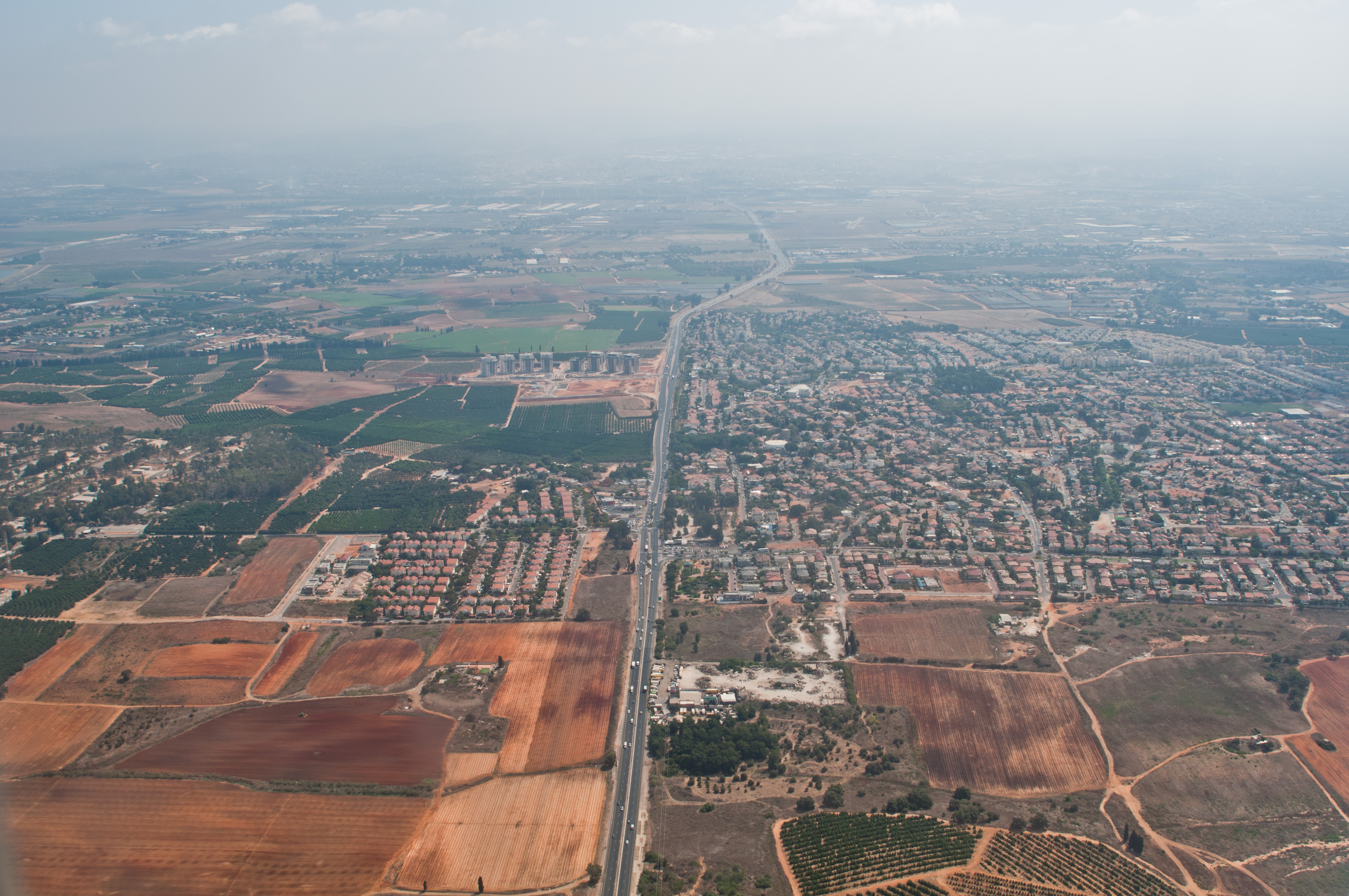
- Highway 57 near Kfar Yona

Route information
- Length: 51 km (32 mi)

Major junctions
- West end: Netanya
- East end: Adam Bridge Border Crossing

Location
- Country: Israel

Highway system
- Roads in Israel; Highways
← Highway 55	→ Highway 60

Highway 57 is an east–west highway through central Israel and the West Bank. In the past, it was an uninterrupted road from Netanya, a city on the Mediterranean coast in the west, to Damia Bridge across the Jordan River in the east. The road existed at full length from the time of the British Mandate, and parts of it are even older. Today, the road is separated into three unconnected parts: the first from Netanya to Nitzanei Oz interchange at Highway 6, the second from there to an Israel Defense Forces checkpoint in Beka'ot in the northeastern West Bank, and the third from there until Damia Bridge. The middle portion of the road between Nitzanei Oz and Beka'ot passes through Tulkarm and Nablus. Most of it is located in Area A and Area B controlled by the Palestinian Authority. Various traffic restrictions exist in these areas.

== History ==
=== Western section ===
The western portion of Highway 57 is located entirely within Israel proper and crosses the narrow strip of land between the Mediterranean coast and the Green Line. It is 15 km long from Netanya to Tulkarm. The ceasefire line between Israel and Jordan was located at Tulkarm between 1948 and 1967, when Israel captured the West Bank in the Six-Day War. Today, continuing from Israel proper into Tulkarm is impossible because the Israeli West Bank barrier blocks the road. Still, it is possible to enter the Nitzanei Shalom Industrial Zone from the western (Israeli) side. This portion of the road is a divided highway with two lanes on each side.

=== Central section ===
The second portion of the route, from Tulkarm via Nablus to Beka'ot junction, is a continuous road with one carriageway. In the first part from Tulkarm until Einav junction, it is open only to Palestinian traffic, and it connects Tulkarm and surrounding villages to Nur Shams and Anabta, and from there to Nablus. This road roughly follows the path of Nahal Shechem (Nahal means creek).

The road previously passed through the center of Tulkarm, but today, it passes through the northern part of the city. This portion of the route served as part of the primary route connecting northern and central Israel before the construction of Highway 4. This old route went from Haifa south via Jenin, Tulkarm and Qalqilya to Tel Aviv.

For this part of the present-day route, there is a bypass road designated for Israeli traffic that was constructed after the Oslo Accords, Route 557. It bypasses the region from the south and passes next to the communities of Qalansawe, Tayibe, Avnei Hefetz, Shufa, Einav and Beit Lid, and reunites with Highway 57 at Einav junction, next to an IDF checkpoint, located on the Palestinian part of the route. From Einav junction to Shavei Shomron junction, the road is jointly accessible to Israelis and Palestinians. From Shavei Shomron to Nablus, the traffic is again exclusively Palestinian. It passes through Deir Sharaf, Beit Iba checkpoint and the center of the city of Nablus, based on the path of Nahal Shekhem. From Nablus, the road is a single carriageway, based on the path of Nahal Tirtza (Wadi al-Far'ah), descending from Nablus into the Jordan Rift Valley. In this portion, until the IDF checkpoint at the moshav Beka'ot, the traffic is exclusively limited to Palestinians.

=== Eastern section ===
From the Beka'ot checkpoint, which stands at the junction of the northern section of the Allon Road (Route 578), the road continues along the path of Nahal Tirtza in a southeast direction. The road follows the ancient "Sunset Road" (דרך מבוא השמש) (Deut 11:29–30) between the Way of the Patriarchs and the King's Highway. This area is under Israeli control, and the road is jointly open to Israeli and Palestinian traffic. For a 2 km stretch, the road overlaps with the Allon Road and then separates from it at Hamra junction, where the central Allon Road (Route 508) begins. Highway 57 continues until the Damia Bridge over the Jordan River, which functions as a border crossing for commerce between Israel and Jordan.

== Junctions & Interchanges (West to East) ==
District	Location	km	mi	Name	Destinations	Notes
Western Section
Central	Netanya	0	0.0		Herzl Street	
Central	Netanya	0.6	0.37	מחלף נתניה (Netanya Interchange)	Highway 2	
Central	Netanya	0.75	0.47		Entrance to Netanya Railway Station	
Central	Netanya	1.45	0.90	צומת נווה איתמר (Neve Itamar Junction)	Pinkas Street	
Central	Beit Yitzhak	2.2	1.4		Deganya Road	
Central	Beit Yitzhak	2.8	1.7	צומת שער חפר (Sha'ar Hefer Junction)	Road 5700	
Central	Ganot Hadar	3.8	2.4	צומת גנות הדר (Ganot Hadar Junction)	Road 5702	
Central	Ganot Hadar	4.3	2.7	צומת השרון (HaSharon Junction)	Highway 4	
Central	Kfar Yona	6.2	3.9		Rabin Boulevard	
Central	Kfar Yona	7.3	4.5	צומת כפר יונה (Kfar Yona Junction)	Begin Boulevard	
Central	Haniel	7.7	4.8	צומת חניאל (Haniel Junction)	Road 5711	
Central	Kfar Yona	8.8	5.5	צומת כפר יונה מזרח (East Kfar Yona Junction)	Route 562	
Central	Yanuv	9.3	5.8	צומת ינוב (Yanuv Junction)	Road 5613	
Central	Tnuvot; Burgata	10	6.2	צומת תנובות (Tnuvot Junction)	Entrance to Tnuvot and Burgata	
Central	Be'erotayim	12	7.5	צומת בארותיים (Be'erotayim Junction)	Road 5614 (southbound)	
Central	Nitzanei Oz	13.2	8.2	צומת ניצני עוז (Nitzanei Oz Junction)	Road 5714	
Central	Nitzanei Oz	14.5	9.0	מחלף ניצני עוז (Nitzanei Oz Interchange)	Highway 6	
Central	Tulkarm	15	9.3	IDF checkpoint Tulkarm/Sha'ar Ephraim; Crossing	Access to Nitzanei Shalom Industrial Zone	
Highway 57 between Tulkarm and Einav (14 km) is closed to Israeli traffic.
Central Section
Judea and Samaria	Einav	29	18	צומת עינב (Einav Junction)	Route 557	
Judea and Samaria	Beit Lid	31	19		Road 5615	
Judea and Samaria	Shavei Shomron	33.5	20.8		Highway 60	
Judea and Samaria	Deir Sharaf	36	22		No passage towards Nablus	
Eastern Section
Judea and Samaria	Hamra	36	22	צומת בקעות (Beka'ot Junction)	Route 508; No passage towards Nablus	Northern end of concurrency with Allon Road
Judea and Samaria	Hamra	37.5	23.3	צומת חמרה (Hamra Junction)	Route 578	Southern end of concurrency with Allon Road
Judea and Samaria	Masua	48	30	צומת אדם (Adam Junction)	Highway 90	
Judea and Samaria	Damia Bridge	51	32		Access to Damia Bridge	
1.000 mi = 1.609 km; 1.000 km = 0.621 mi

== See also ==
- List of highways in Israel
