= Shirat HaYam =

Former Israeli settlement in the Gaza Strip

Shirat HaYam: שירת הים (Hebrew)
- Former Israeli settlement
- Etymology: Song of the Sea
- Location within the Gaza Strip
- Coordinates: 31°21′48″N 34°16′16″E
- Country: Israel
- Founded: 2001

Shirat HaYam (Hebrew: שִׁירַת הַיָּם, lit. 'Song of the Sea') was an Israeli settlement established in 2001 on the shores of the Mediterranean Sea west of Neve Dekalim in the Gush Katif settlement bloc in the Gaza Strip that existed until 2005.

== Population ==
About fifteen families lived in trailers or abandoned houses that reportedly had been Egyptian Army officer's barracks from the period when Egypt occupied the Gaza Strip.

== Evacuation ==
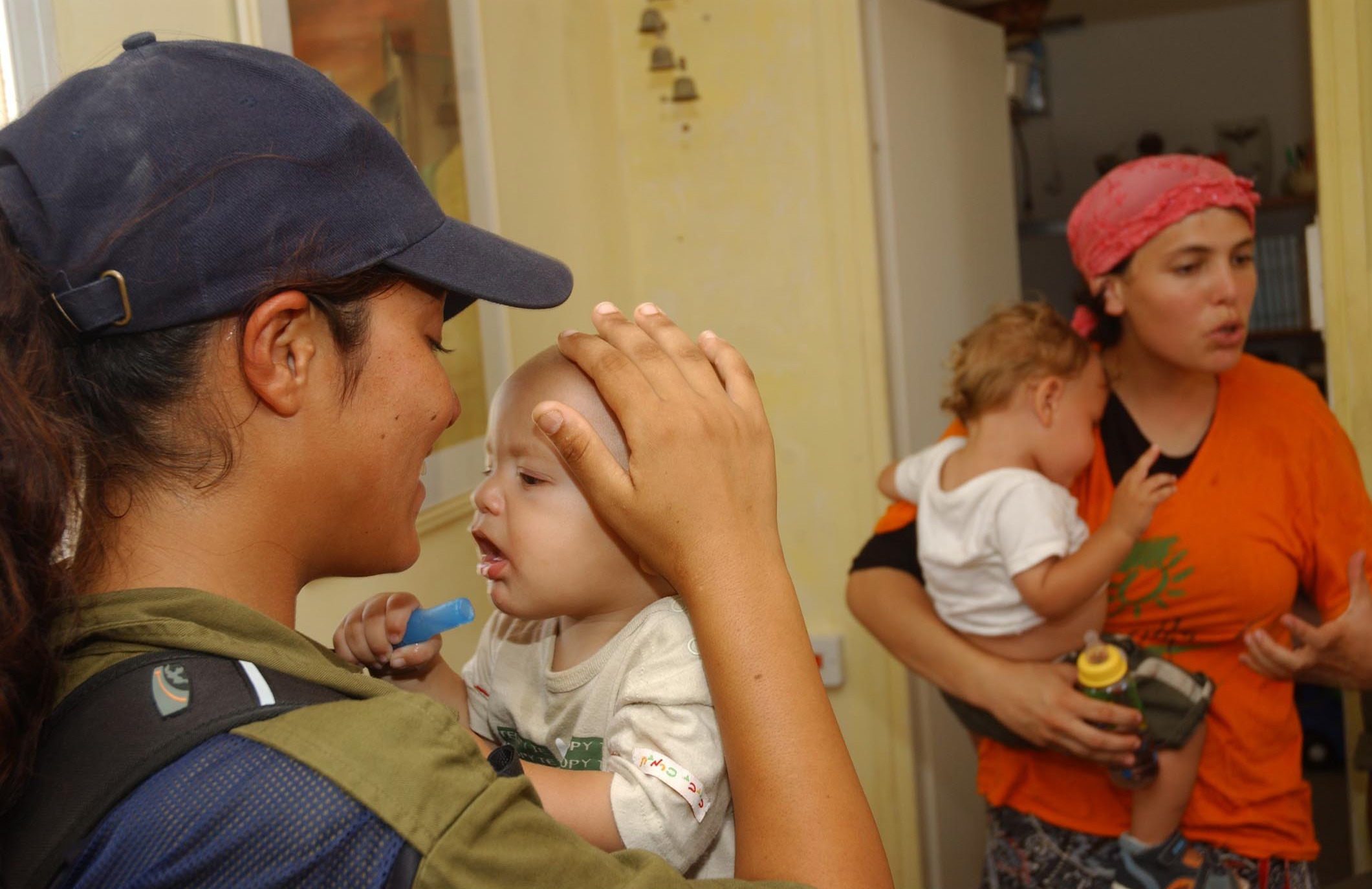
The Evacuation of Shirat Hayam

On 14 August 2005, immediately prior to the execution of the disengagement plan evacuation, Aryeh Yitzhaki, an Israeli military historian residing in Shirat HaYam, proclaimed independence as "The Independent Jewish Authority in Gaza Beach." He called himself The Temporary Chairman "until the election of the 2,500 citizens" in his new country. He followed through with his claim by sending an appeal for recognition to the United Nations and the Red Cross. Four days later, when the Israel Defense Forces and Israeli Police came to evacuate Shirat Hayam, he defended this self-proclaimed country alone with an M-16 after ascending the roof of his home. The event ended peacefully after a few hours, and the settlement was successfully evacuated.

While the standard policy adapted by the Israeli government was to destroy all residential property prior to the retreat from Gush Katif, the cement structures in this settlement were not touched until several weeks later.

The evicted residents of the village chose to remain together as a group and move to Maskiot in the Jordan River valley to build an agricultural settlement. Since the Maskiot site, a former military base, was not ready for settlement, the group moved to adjacent Hemdat.
