= Hemdat =

Israeli settlement in the West Bank

Hemdat: חמדת (Hebrew)
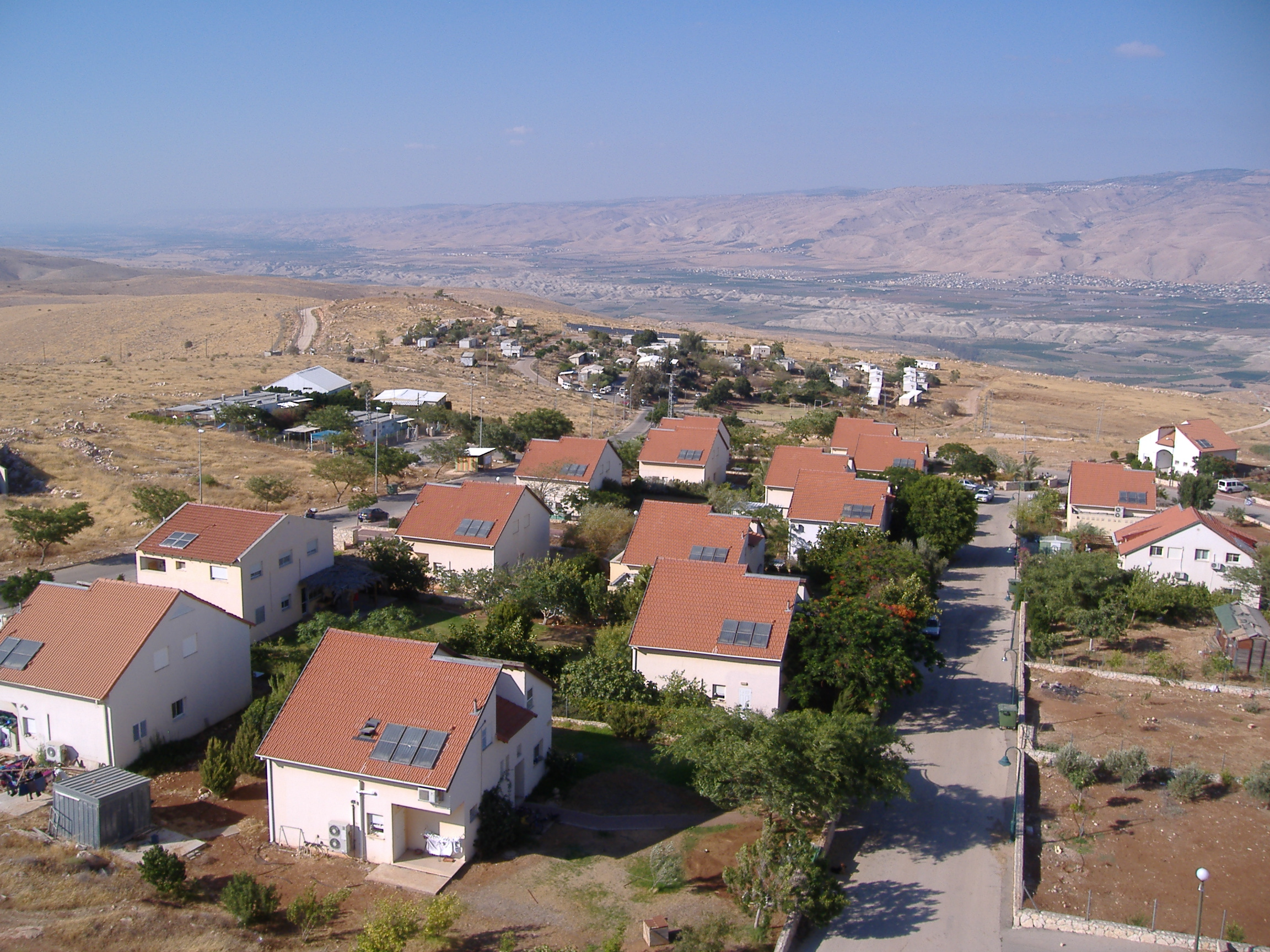

- Location within the Northern West Bank Location within the West Bank
- Coordinates: 32°15′07″N 35°31′37″E
- Country: Palestine
- District: Judea and Samaria Area
- Council: Bik'at HaYarden
- Region: West Bank
- Affiliation: Amana
- Founded: 1979
- Founder: Nahal
- Population (2024): 431

Hemdat (Hebrew: חמדת) is a community Israeli settlement in the West Bank located near the Palestinian hamlet of Khirbet Makhoul, in the Jordan River Valley on a plain at an altitude of 178 metres along the Allon Road in the municipal jurisdiction of the Bik'at HaYarden Regional Council. Other Israeli settlements in the area are Ro'i and Beka'ot. The closest city, Beit Shean, is a thirty-minute drive north of Hemdat. In 2024, Hemdat had a population of 431.

The international community considers Israeli settlements in the West Bank illegal under international law, but the Israeli government disputes this.

== History ==
Hemdat was first established in 1979, as a pioneer Nahal military outpost that was soon thereafter demilitarized and turned into a kibbutz when turned over to residential purposes to a group of pioneers from Hashomer Hatzair and Israel Boy and Girl Scouts Federation. Due to the harsh living conditions of the valley (intense heat, distant location) and other obstacles, this group abandoned the kibbutz and the village was returned to the Israel Defense Forces Nahal brigade. In 1997, a group of Bnei David Mechina pre-military yeshiva academy in Eli, organized by the Amana organization moved to Hemdat to resettle it. One family named Shitrit moved with the students.

== Education ==
Since 1997, a religious pre-military academy called Hemdat Yehuda is operating in the settlement. Other educational institutions include a nursery school and a kindergarten.

== Demographics ==
As of 2024, 53.6% of Hemdat's population were male, 46.2% female. Roughly 70% of the population was under 24 years of age.

Hemdat does not have a homogeneous population and it is made up of a mixed group of families from different Jewish ethnic backgrounds and locations in Israel. There is one central synagogue that serves the village, as well as religious services at the academy.

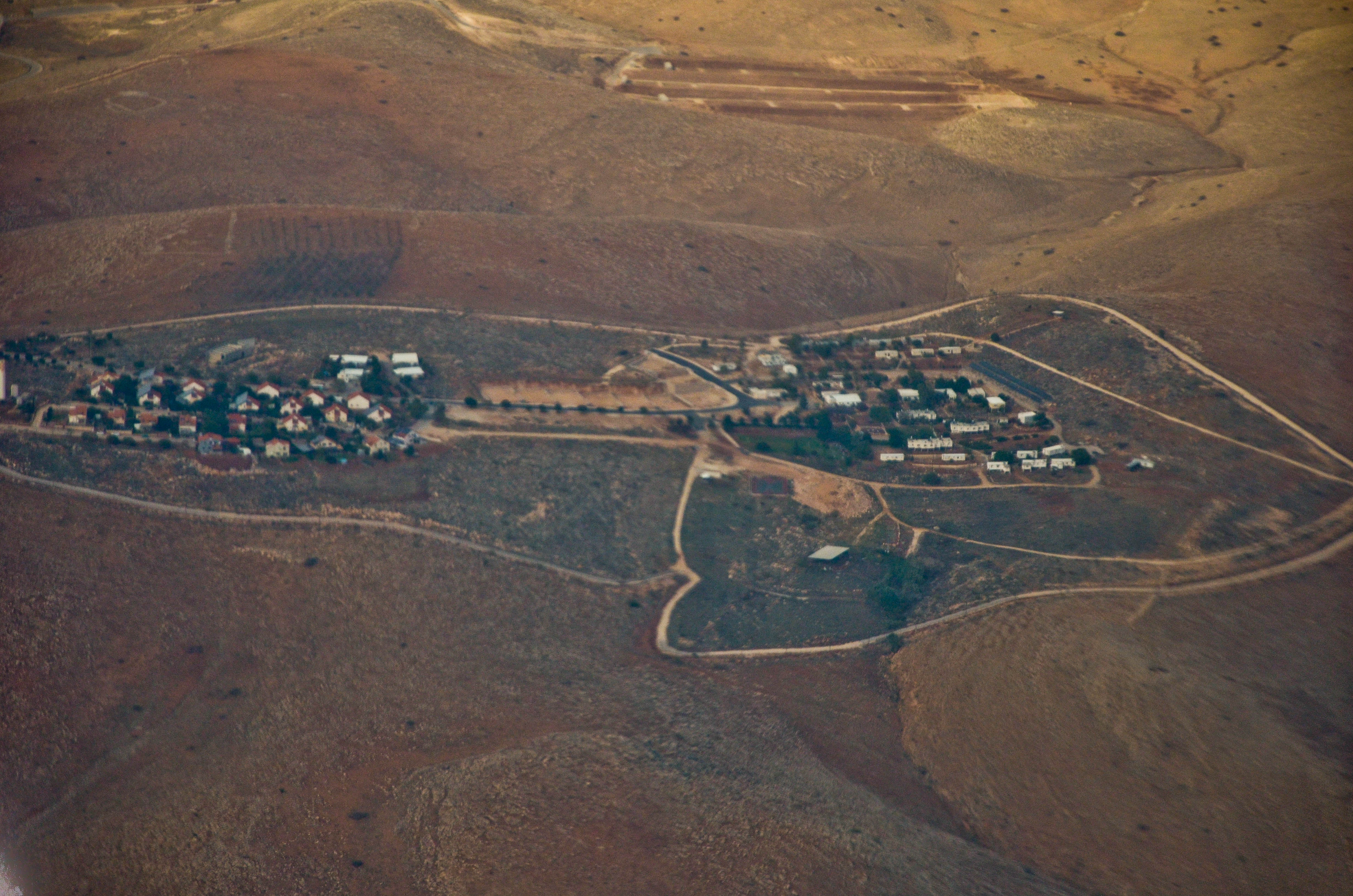
Aerial view of Hemdat
