= Highway 5 (Israel–Palestine) =

Highway in Israel and Palestine

Coordinates: 32°06′16″N 34°59′25″E

Highway 5
- כביש 5
- Trans-Samaria Highway כביש חוצה שומרון
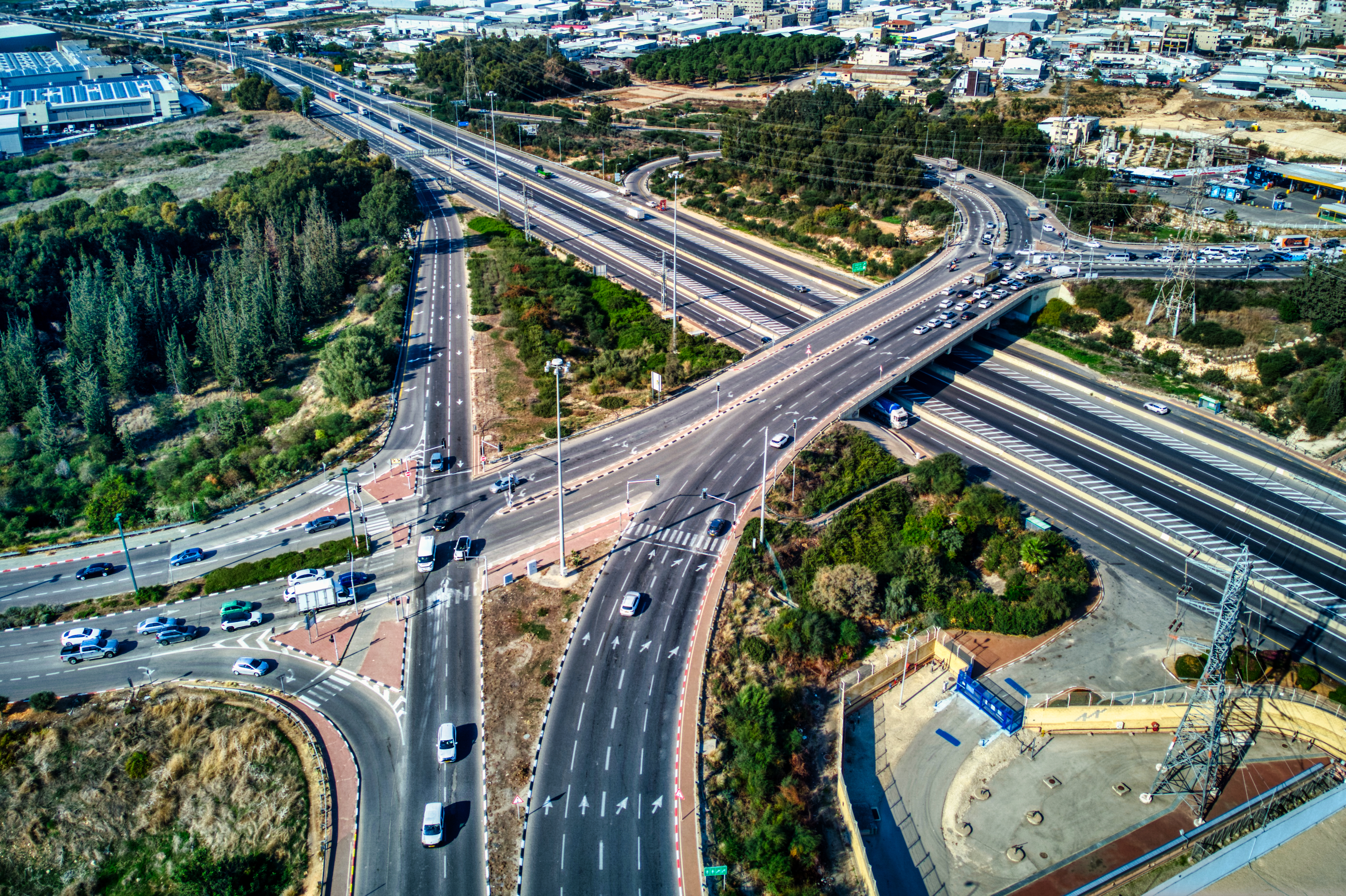
- Rosh HaAyin North Interchange

Route information
- Length: 37 km (23 mi)

Major junctions
- West end: West Glilot Interchange
- Glilot Interchange; Morasha Interchange; Yarkon Interchange; Kessem Interchange
- East end: Ariel Junction

Location
- Country: Israel
- Major cities: Ramat HaSharon, Hod HaSharon, Petah Tikva, Rosh HaAyin,

Highway system
- Roads in Israel; Highways
← Highway 4	→ Highway 6

Highway 5 or the Trans-Samaria Highway (Hebrew: כביש חוצה שומרון, Kvish Hotze Shomron), is one of Israel's main highways, connecting the Mediterranean coast immediately north of Tel Aviv with the central Sharon plain and eastwards to Ariel and other Israeli settlements in the northern West Bank.

The name Highway 5 is commonly used to describe the section of the highway running from the road's western end at the Glilot Interchange until it reaches the main entrance of Ariel. In this capacity it intersects and creates a connection between four important arterial freeways in the northern Tel Aviv area: The Coastal Highway (Highway 2), the Ayalon Highway (Highway 20), Geha Highway (Highway 4) and the Cross-Israel Highway (Highway 6).

An alternate name for the entire highway is Kvish Hotze Shomron meaning the Trans-Samaria Highway though often this name is used when referring specifically to the section of the road in the West Bank, i.e., past the Green Line, where it continues east towards the Jordan Valley in the West Bank. This section from the Green Line to its eastern end has also been dedicated as "Derekh Haim" (Haim's Road, but also "Way of Life") after the late Haim Landau, a former Israeli Minister of Transportation.

== History ==
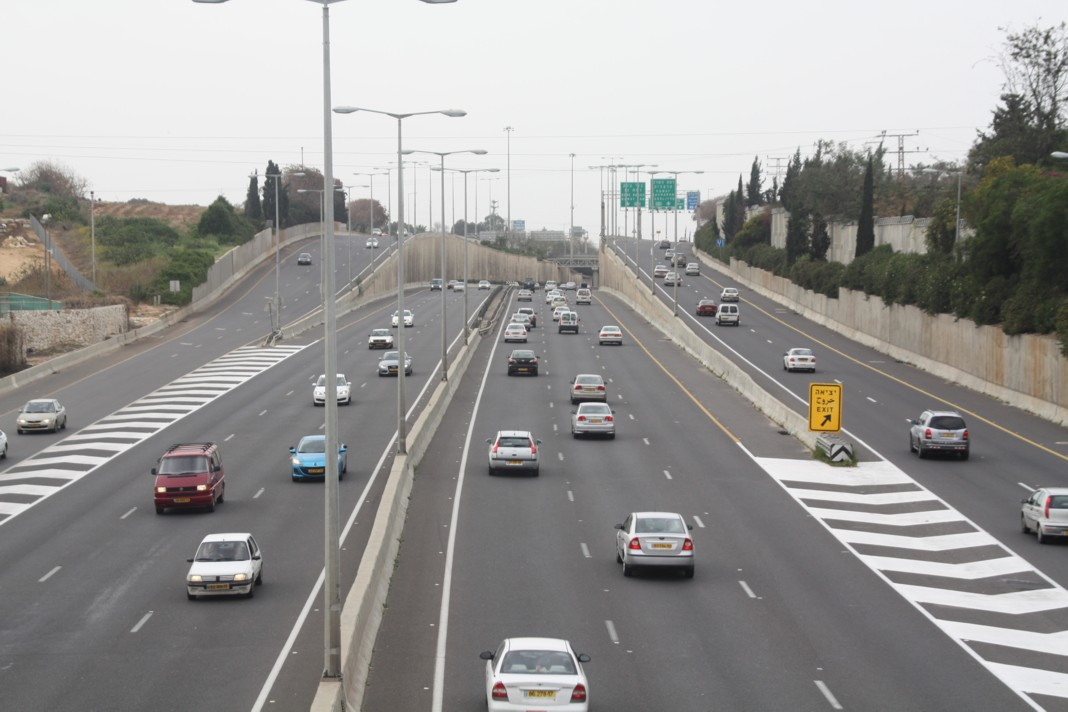
Highway 5 near Ramat HaSharon.

Works on Highway 5 initially started in 1965, and its westmost section opened in 1967. Extension of the highway began to be built in 1985 and reached Rosh HaAyin in 1987. it was serving mainly the densely populated Gush Dan metropolitan area. During the 90's the road's junctions were upgraded to interchanges.

In the West Bank, the main road was still the old Road 505, which, since the events of the Second Intifada in 2000, has been partially closed to Jewish transportation. In the beginning of the 1990s, with the growth of Ariel and the settlements around it, arose the need for a more modern and wider road, than the single-lane low-quality Road 505. Therefore, Highway 5 was extended some 20 km to the east of the Green Line, ending almost within sight of Ariel and serving the largest block of the Israeli settlements in the northern West Bank, counting about 50,000 people, as well as the Barkan Industrial Park. At the time, this section of Highway 5 was one of the biggest infrastructure projects that Israel had undertaken in the West Bank. As of 2017 the road terminates at a roundabout at the Ariel junction where it merges into Road 505 which continues east past Ariel until Petza'el, which is located on Route 90, the north–south road parallel to the Israel-Jordan border in the Jordan Valley.

The western section of the highway consists of between 3 and 5 lanes in each direction, which reduces in number as the highway heads eastward. As of 2017, the westward section surrounding Gush Dan is one of the most congested in Israel.

Highway 531 is a freeway which parallels Highway 5 and runs approximately 5–6 km to the north, was opened in 2017, and also contains a rail system. A toll fast lane project is planned along Highway 5.

== Interchanges and Junctions (West to East) ==
District	Location	km	mi	Name	Destinations	Notes
Tel Aviv	Tel Aviv	0	0.0	מחלף גלילות מערב (West Glilot Interchange)	Highway 2	
Tel Aviv	Ramat Hasharon	1	0.62	מחלף גלילות מזרח (East Glilot Interchange)	Highway 20	
Tel Aviv	Ramat Hasharon	1.7	1.1	מחלף שדרות ירוב (Yariv Blvd. Interchange)	Aharon Yariv Blvd.	Eastbound only
Tel Aviv	Ramat Hasharon	3.3	2.1	מחלף הכפר הירוק (HaKfar HaYarok Interchange)	Route 482	Named after nearby HaKfar HaYarok
Tel Aviv	Ramat HaSharon (Morasha quarter)	5.8	3.6	מחלף מורשה (Morasha Interchange)	Highway 4	
Central	Petah Tikva	8	5.0	מחלף תקווה (Tikva Interchange)	Zevulun Hammer Road	
Central	Petah Tikva; Hod HaSharon	10.5	6.5	מחלף ירקון (Yarkon Interchange)	Highway 40	Named after nearby Yarkon River
Central	Rosh HaAyin	13.5	8.4	מחלף קסם (Kessem Interchange)	Highway 6 Route 444	Named after nearby Kafr Qasim
Central	Rosh HaAyin; Kfar Qasim	17	11	מחלף ראש העין צפון (Rosh HaAyin North Interchange)	Road 5050	
Green Line
Judea and Samaria	Oranit; Elkana	21	13	מחלף שער שומרון (Samaria Gate Interchange)	Route 505	
Qasim Security Checkpoint; NO westbound through-traffic for green (Palestinian Authority) license plates
Judea and Samaria	Bruchin; Bruqin	33	21	מחלף ברוכין (Bruchin Interchange)	Route 446	
Judea and Samaria	Barkan	35	22	מחלף ברקן (Barkan Interchange)	Road 4765	
Judea and Samaria	Revava; Haris	37	23	צומת גיתי (Gitai Junction)	Route 505	Western end of concurrency with Route 505
Judea and Samaria	Ariel; Kifl Haris	40	25	צומת אריאל (Ariel Junction)	Route 505	Eastern end of concurrency with Route 505
1.000 mi = 1.609 km; 1.000 km = 0.621 mi: Concurrency terminus
