= Rotem (Israeli settlement) =

Israeli settlement in the West Bank

Rotem: רותם (Hebrew)
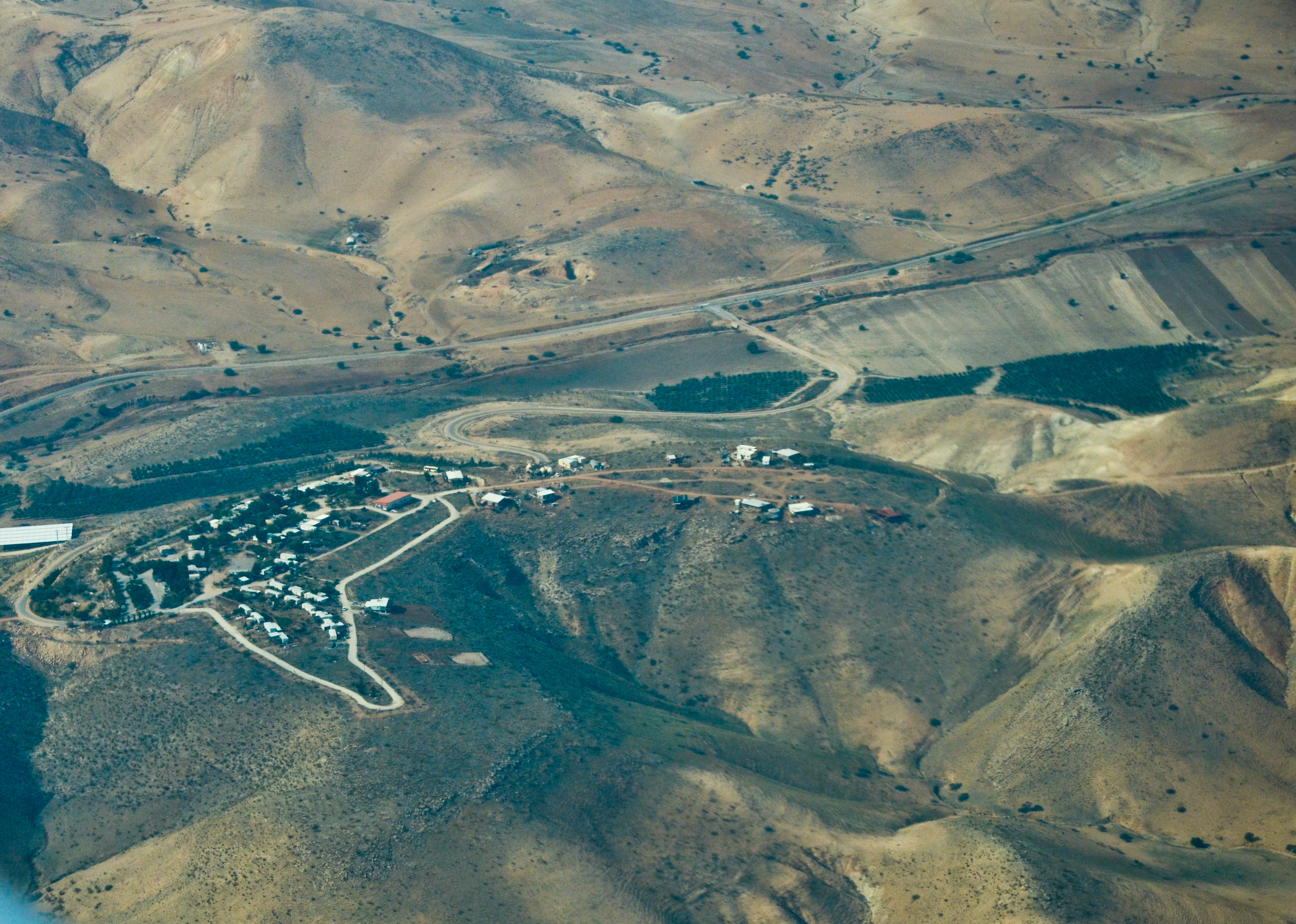
- Aerial view

- Location within the Northern West Bank
- Coordinates: 32°20′12″N 35°31′06″E
- Country: Palestine
- District: Judea and Samaria Area
- Council: Bik'at HaYarden
- Region: West Bank
- Founded: 1983
- Population (2024): 330

Rotem (Hebrew: רותם) is an Israeli settlement in the West Bank. Located in the northern Jordan River Valley along the Allon Road south-west of Shadmot Mehola, it falls under the jurisdiction of Bik'at HaYarden Regional Council. In 2024 it had a population of 330.

The international community considers Israeli settlements in the West Bank illegal under international law, but the Israeli government disputes this.

== History ==
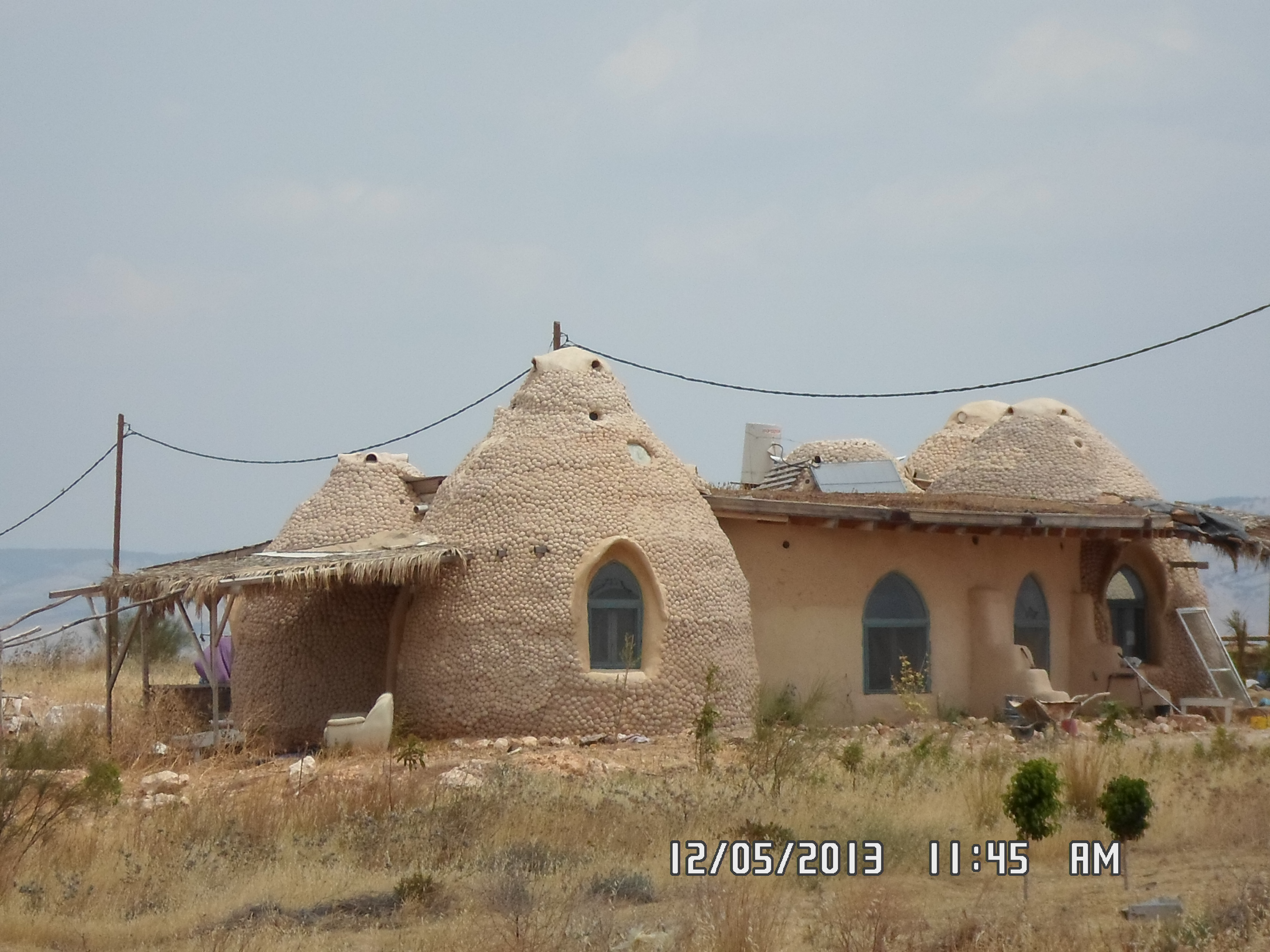
Home in Rotem

Rotem was first established as a pioneer Nahal military outpost and later abandoned. Several failed attempts were made to try a reestablish either a military or civilian presence at the site. The current initiative was established in 2001. The village prides itself on being a joint non-Orthodox and Orthodox community, inhabited by both religious and non-religious Jews.

== Eco-Settlement ==
Rotem presents itself as an ecological settlement with a focus on environmentally friendly infrastructure. Most of the homes are not connected to a sewer system and rely on such solutions as cesspools, devices that purify wastewater and experimental systems developed at the Technion for treating sewage and converting it into an energy source. However, others argue that the settlement's environmentalism is a tool for colonisation, in particular as Palestinian villages are not permitted to build their own eco-friendly and sustainable infrastructure. In the nearby Bedouin village of Khirbet Humsa, the civil administration destroyed the only solar panels providing electricity to the village. These solar panels had been constructed due to the Israeli authorities' prevention of access to the Israeli electricity grid by Bedouin villagers.

== See also ==
- Ecovillages
