= Kokhav HaShahar =

Israeli settlement in the West Bank

Kokhav HaShahar: כּוֹכַב הַשַּׁחַר (Hebrew)
- Israeli settlement
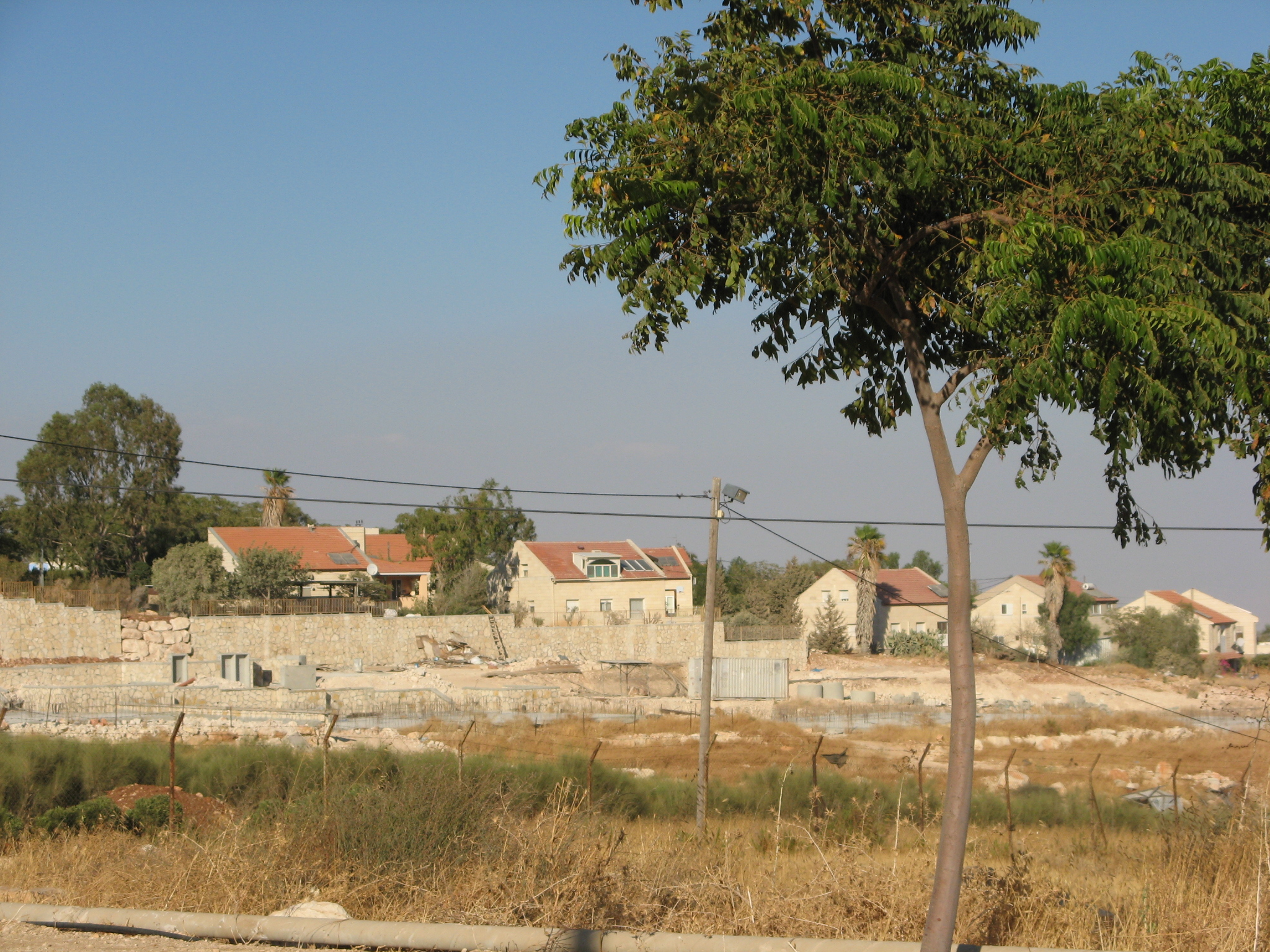
- Etymology: Morning Star
- Location within the Central West Bank
- Coordinates: 31°57′36″N 35°20′53″E
- Country: Palestine
- District: Judea and Samaria Area
- Council: Mateh Binyamin
- Region: West Bank
- Affiliation: Amana
- Founded: 1979
- Population (2024): 2,778

Kokhav HaShahar (Hebrew: כּוֹכַב הַשַּׁחַר, also spelt Kochav Shachar and Kochav HaShachar, trans. Morning Star) is an Israeli settlement in the northern West Bank, organized as a community settlement in the Binyamin region. Located on a mountain ridge overlooking the Jordan Valley and accessible via the Allon Road, it falls under the municipal jurisdiction of Mateh Binyamin Regional Council. In 2024, it had a population of 2,778.

The international community considers Israeli settlements in the West Bank illegal under international law, but the Israeli government disputes this.

== History ==
Kokhav HaShahar was founded by ten young couples in 1980 on the site of an Israel Defense Forces outpost.

According to the Palestinian NGO ARIJ, Israel confiscated land from two villages in order to build Kokhav HaShahar:

- 1,264 dunams from Deir Jarir,
- 433 dunams from Kafr Malik.

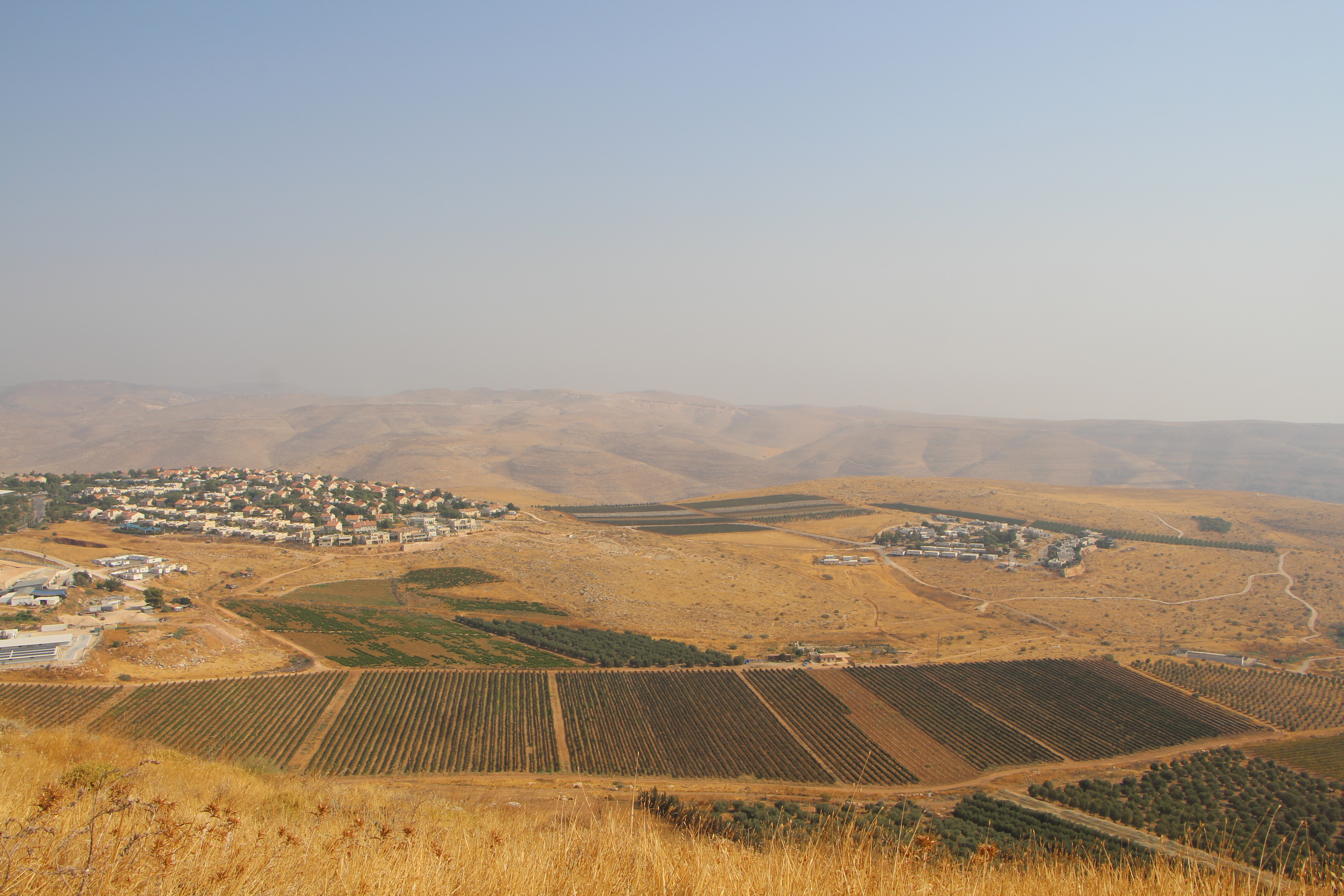
Vinyard of Kokhav HaShahar.

Near Kokhav HaShahar is a site of one of many quarries operated by Israeli companies in the West Bank. Yesh Din legal counsel Michael Sfard said that "according to international law, so long as the West Bank is not annexed to Israel, it is forbidden for Israel to exploit the natural resources there for non-security related purposes." Sfard also stated that 74% of the gravel mined from these quarries is used for construction inside Israel, and that that means the existence of the quarries violate international law.

=== Maoz Esther outpost ===
Maoz Esther, north of Kokhav HaShahar, was an outpost established in 2005 by Kokhav HaShahar residents in memory of Ester Galia of Kokhav HaShahar, who was murdered at Rimonim junction by Palestinian terrorists. The Israel Police destroyed the settlement's seven huts in May 2009. Since then, settlers have repeatedly rebuilt the outpost, and police have each time removed the huts.
