= Einav =

Israeli settlement in the West Bank

Einav: עֵנָב, עינב (Hebrew); عيناف (Arabic)
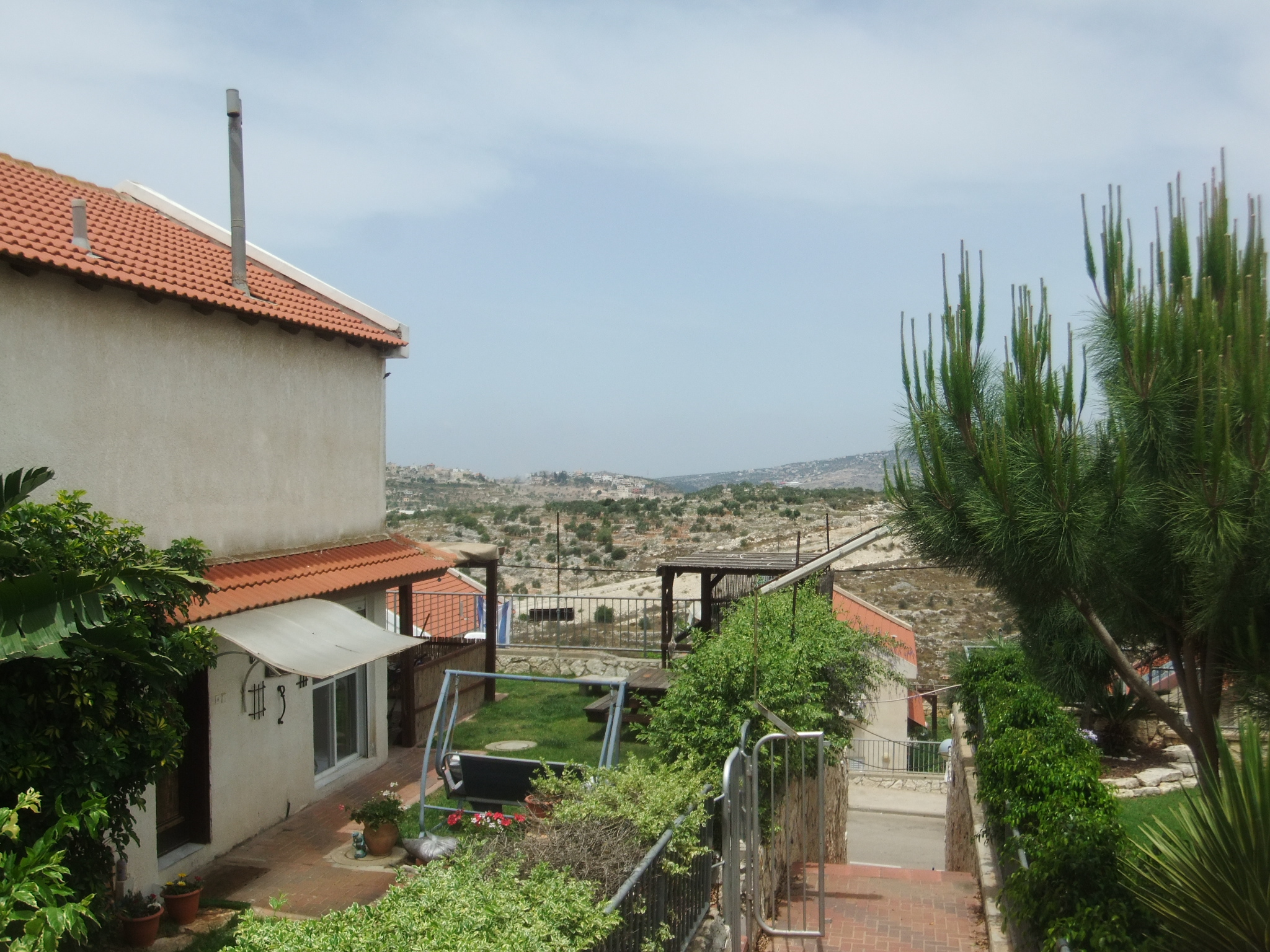
- Etymology: Grape
- Location within the Northern West Bank
- Coordinates: 32°17′4″N 35°7′34″E
- Country: Palestine
- District: Judea and Samaria Area
- Council: Shomrom
- Region: West Bank
- Affiliation: Amana
- Founded: 1981
- Founder: Amana
- Population (2024): 1,228

Einav (Hebrew: עֵנָב) is an Israeli settlement organized as a community settlement in the northern West Bank, located adjacent to the Palestinian village of Ramin, whose lands were confiscated in order to construct Einav. It is located on Highway 57 between Avnei Hefetz and Shavei Shomron, the religious Zionist and Orthodox Jewish community is within the municipal jurisdiction of the Shomron Regional Council.

The international community considers Israeli settlements in the West Bank illegal under international law, but the Israeli government disputes this.

== History ==
According to the ARIJ, Israel confiscated 470 dunams of land from the nearby Palestinian village of Ramin in order to construct Einav (and the accompanying bypass roads and military positions), in addition to confiscating 20 dunams from Kafr al-Labad.

Established in 1981 with the assistance of the Amana settlement organization, by 2024 it had a population of 1,228. The name of the village comes to remember the vineyards that used to be a feature of the surrounding areas.
