= Uzi Yairi =

Israeli soldier

- עוזי יאירי
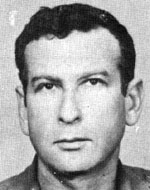
- אל"מ עוזי יאירי ז"ל
- Born: July 31, 1936; Ramat Gan, Israel
- Died: March 5, 1975 (aged 38); Savoy Hotel, Tel Aviv, Israel
- Military career
- Allegiance: Israel
- Branch: Israel Defense Forces
- Service years: 1955–1975
- Rank: Aluf Mishne
- Commands: Commander, Sayeret Matkal; Commander, Paratroopers Brigade
- Conflicts: Sinai War; Six-Day War; War of Attrition; Yom Kippur War

Uzi Yairi (Hebrew: עוזי יאירי; 31 July 1936 – 5 March 1975, Tel Aviv, Israel) was an Israeli military officer and commander of the elite Israeli army commando unit Sayeret Matkal. He was killed in action during a counter-terrorism operation to free hostages held by Palestinian militants at the Savoy Hotel.

Yairi became head of Sayeret Matkal at age 31 and a full colonel at only 35. He also served as a brigade commander during the Yom Kippur War, but left the army as a result of trauma he had suffered during the war. Тo commemorate him, moshav Ro'i was named after him. The name is an acronym for Ramat Uzi Yairi.
