= Route 446 (Israel–Palestine) =

Route in Israel

Coordinates: 31°57′53.9″N 35°2′33.6″E

Route 446
- כביש 446
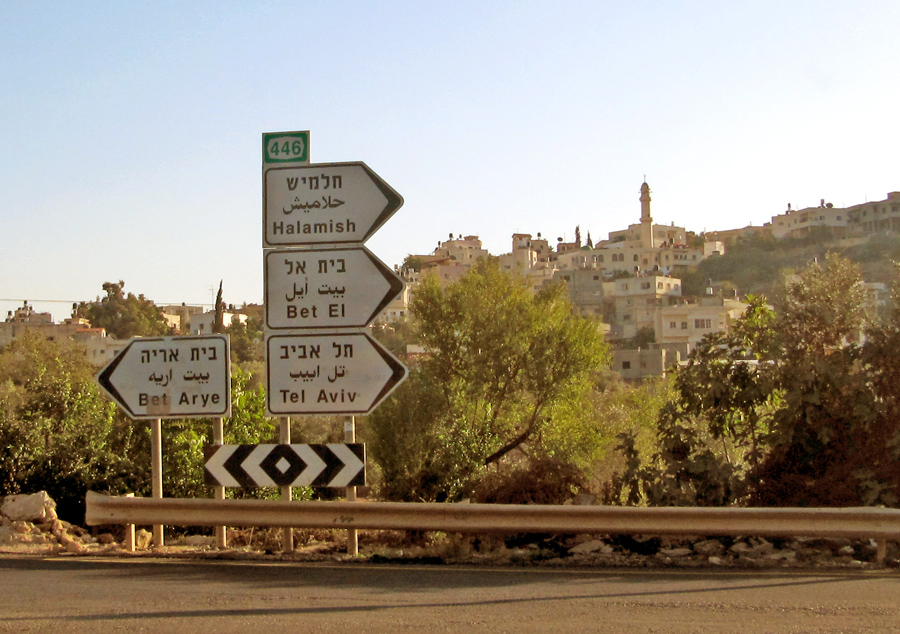

Route information
- Length: 31 km (19 mi)

Major junctions
- South end: Shilat Junction
- North end: Baruchin Interchange

Location
- Country: Israel
- Major cities: Modi'in-Maccabim-Re'ut; Modi'in Illit; Leshem

Highway system
- Roads in Israel; Highways
← Route 444	→ Route 449

Route 446 is a regional arterial road that begins at the Shilat junction in Modi'in-Maccabim-Re'ut in the south, ending at the Baruchin Interchange on Highway 5 in the north. The length of the road is 31 km, and almost all of it passes outside the Green Line. The most interesting point on the road is the crossing of Nahal Shilo north of Beit Aryeh-Ofarim.

== History ==
Route 446 has existed at least since the days of Jordanian rule when its number was "99". Until the 1990s, the route of the road was different, and near the village of Deir Ballut, it continued north towards Mas-ha and Azzun, reaching as far as Tulkarm. The road number still appears on the old route, especially in the Azzun area.

== See also ==
- List of highways in Israel
- Shuqba Cave, type-site of the Natufian culture in valley traversed by the road
