= Highway 2 (Israel) =

Highway in Israel

Highway 2
- כביש 2
- The Coastal Highway כביש החוף; The New Haifa–Tel Aviv Highway כביש חיפה - תל אביב החדש
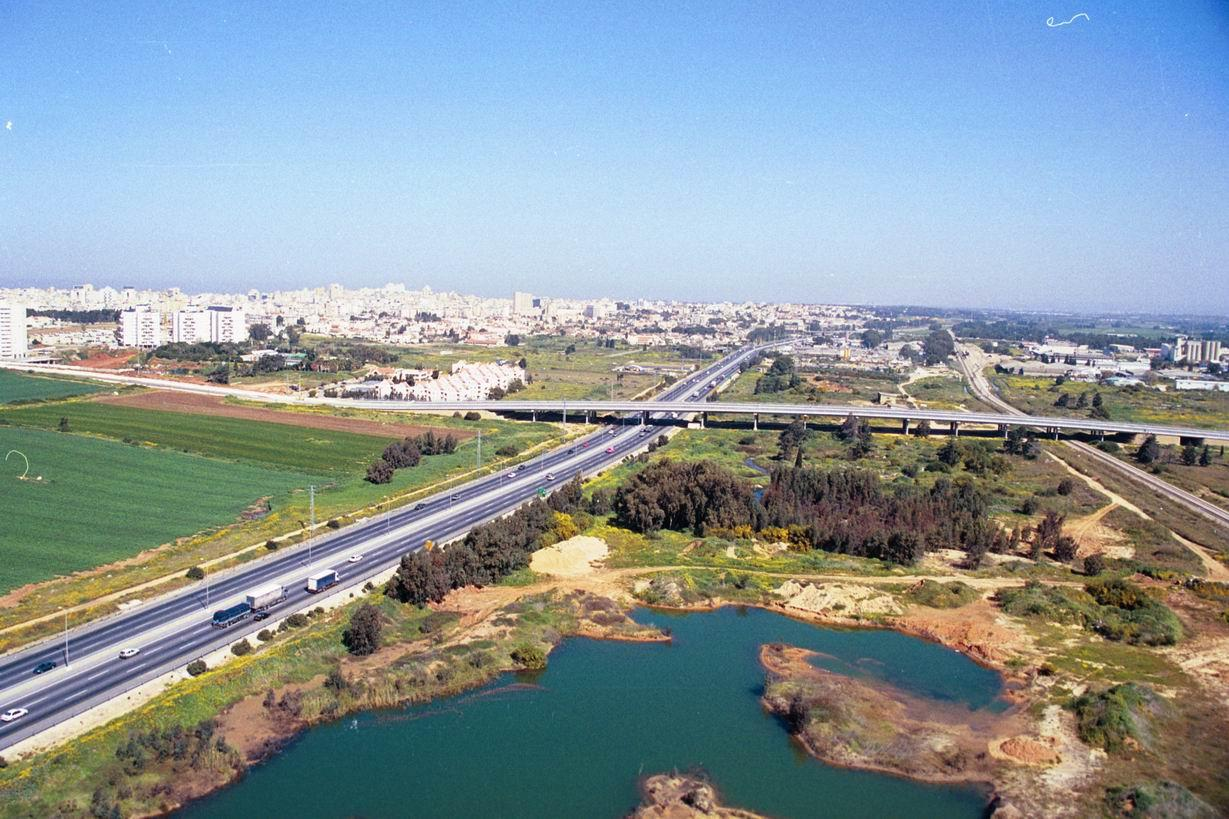
- Highway 2 nearby Netanya.

Route information
- Length: 90 km (56 mi)

Major junctions
- South end: Tel Aviv (Heil HaSiryon Interchange)
- North end: Haifa (Haifa South Interchange)

Location
- Country: Israel
- Major cities: Tel Aviv, Herzliya, Netanya, Hadera, Tirat Carmel, Haifa

Highway system
- Roads in Israel; Highways
← Highway 1	→ Highway 3

Highway 2 (Hebrew: כביש 2, Kvish 2) is a highway located on the coastal plain of the Mediterranean Sea in Israel. It begins as a major arterial road within Tel Aviv, becoming a freeway as it exits the city northward, continuing to Haifa. North of Tel Aviv, the highway is also called The Coastal Highway (Hebrew: כביש החוף, Kvish HaHof).

Highway 2 is one of the busiest highways in the country, and drivers experience frequent traffic congestion between Hadera and Tel Aviv during rush hours. The northern sections are also congested at times, especially during weekends and holidays, when many Israelis travel north for vacation.

== History ==
The first section of the highway between Tel Aviv and Netanya was built in the early 1950s as a two-lane road with at-grade intersections. The following section was built later that decade, extending the highway north to Olga Junction in Hadera. This section was also built as a two-lane road. It was widened to four lanes between Tel Aviv and Hadera in 1965. However, grade separations were not built.

The last section of the highway, between Olga Junction and Haifa, opened in 1969. When this section opened, it was Israel's first freeway. Deteriorating road conditions caused by years of neglect led to this section being downgraded from its original freeway status. Though road signs on this section are still blue (as opposed to green on regular highways), there are a few signs indicating an entrance or exit from a freeway, and the maximum speed limit is 90–110 km/h, making it an Israeli freeway.

The junctions on the older sections of the highway were gradually grade separated: Netanya Interchange was built in 1974, Poleg Interchange in 1975, Havazelet Interchange in 1989, Yanai Interchange in 1990, Olga Interchange in 1993, Hof HaSharon Interchange in 1994 and Rabin Interchange and HaSira Interchange in 1995. Today, the highway is grade-separated along its route between the Haifa South and West Glilot interchanges.

The Tel Aviv–Netanya section was widened to six lanes in the 1990s.

The West Glilot Interchange opened on February 28, 2007, providing a direct connection to eastbound Highway 5 and the Ayalon Highway.

== Coastal roadway corridor ==
The Carmel Tunnels form a northern extension of Highway 2, which connects directly to Highway 22 in the Krayot area north of Haifa. This northern extension, along with the Ayalon Highway and parts of Highway 4, make up a series of controlled-access highways that together form an inter-city highway corridor stretching along most of Israel's Mediterranean coast, from Acre (Akko) in the north to Ashdod in the south. In the future, a parallel but more inland controlled-access corridor will also be provided by Highway 6 when it is fully built.

== Plans ==
There are plans to continue the six-lane section north to the Zikhron Ya'akov Interchange. These plans also include upgrading the remaining part between Zikhron Ya'akov and Haifa to freeway standards. As part of this effort, works to rebuild and widen the division between Havatzelet HaSharon and the Olga interchange are expected to commence in 2020 for NIS1.2 billion (equivalent to US$330 million in 2018 dollars).

== Interchanges ==
District	Location	km	mi	Name	Destinations	Notes
Tel Aviv	HaTikva	0	0.0	מחלף חיל השריון (Heil HaShiryon Interchange)	Highway 20	
Tel Aviv	HaTikva	0.2	0.12	מחלף קיבוץ גלויות (Kibbutz Galuyot Interchange)	Highway 1; Highway 20; Route 461	
Tel Aviv	HaKirya	3.5	2.2	מחלף קפלן (Kaplan Interchange)	Kaplan Street	
Tel Aviv	Shikun Lamed	6.3	3.9	גשר הירקון (Yarkon Bridge)	Bnei Dan Street	Named after nearby Yarkon River
Tel Aviv	Shikun Lamed	6.6	4.1	גשר רוקח (Rokach Bridge)	Rochach Blvd.	
Tel Aviv	Ramat Aviv; Ramat HaSharon	11	6.8	מחלף גלילות מערב (Glilot Ma'arav Interchange)	Highway 5; Highway 20; Namir Road	Named after location of former Jewish refugee camp Glilot
Tel Aviv	Herzliya	13	8.1	מחלף הסירה (HaSira Interchange)	Route 541	
Tel Aviv	Herzliya	15.5	9.6	מחלף רבין (Rabin Interchange)	Keren Hayesod St.	Named after Yitzhak Rabin
Central	Rishpon	18	11	מסעף רשפון (Rishpon Branch)	HaKfar St.	
Central	Ga'ash	19	12	מחלף רשפון – געש (Rishpon – Ga'ash Interchange)	Highway 20	
Central	Shefayim	21	13	מחלף חוף השרון (Hof HaSharon Interchange)	Road 5514	
Central	Yakum	24	15	מסעף יקום (Yakum Branch)	local road	Northbound only
Central	Wingate Institute	25	16	מסעף וינגייט (Wingate Branch)	Entrance road	Southbound only
Central	Udim	26.5	16.5	מסעף אודים (Udim Branch)	HaTse'elon St.	Northbound only
Central	Netanya	27	17	מחלף פולג (Poleg Interchange)	Route 553	Named after nearby Poleg Stream
Central	Netanya	29	18	מחלף גשר השלום (Peace Bridge Interchange)	Road 5611	
Central	Netanya	33	21	מחלף נתניה (Netanya Interchange)	Highway 57	
Central	Havatzelet HaSharon	38	24	מחלף חבצלת (Havatzelet Interchange)	Road 5710	
Central	Beit Yanai	41	25	מחלף ינאי (Yanai Interchange)	Road 5720	
Haifa	Hadera	45	28	מחלף חרובים (Cherubim Interchange)	Highway 9	
Haifa	Hadera	48	30	מחלף אולגה (Olga Interchange)	Aaron Aaronsohn St.	
Haifa	Caesarea	51	32	מחלף קיסריה (Caesarea Interchange)	Highway 65	
Haifa	Or Akiva	55	34	מחלף אור עקיבא (Or Akiva Interchange)	Road 6511	
Haifa	Zikhron Ya'akov	65	40	מחלף זכרון יעקב (Zikhron Ya'akov Interchange)	Highway 67	
Haifa	Atlit	79	49	מחלף עתלית (Atlit Interchange)	Route 721; Road 7110	
Haifa	Haifa	90	56	מחלף חיפה דרום (South Haifa Interchange)	Highway 4 Highway 23	
1.000 mi = 1.609 km; 1.000 km = 0.621 mi: Proposed
