= Rimonim =

Israeli settlement in the West Bank

Rimonim: רִמּוֹנִים (Hebrew)
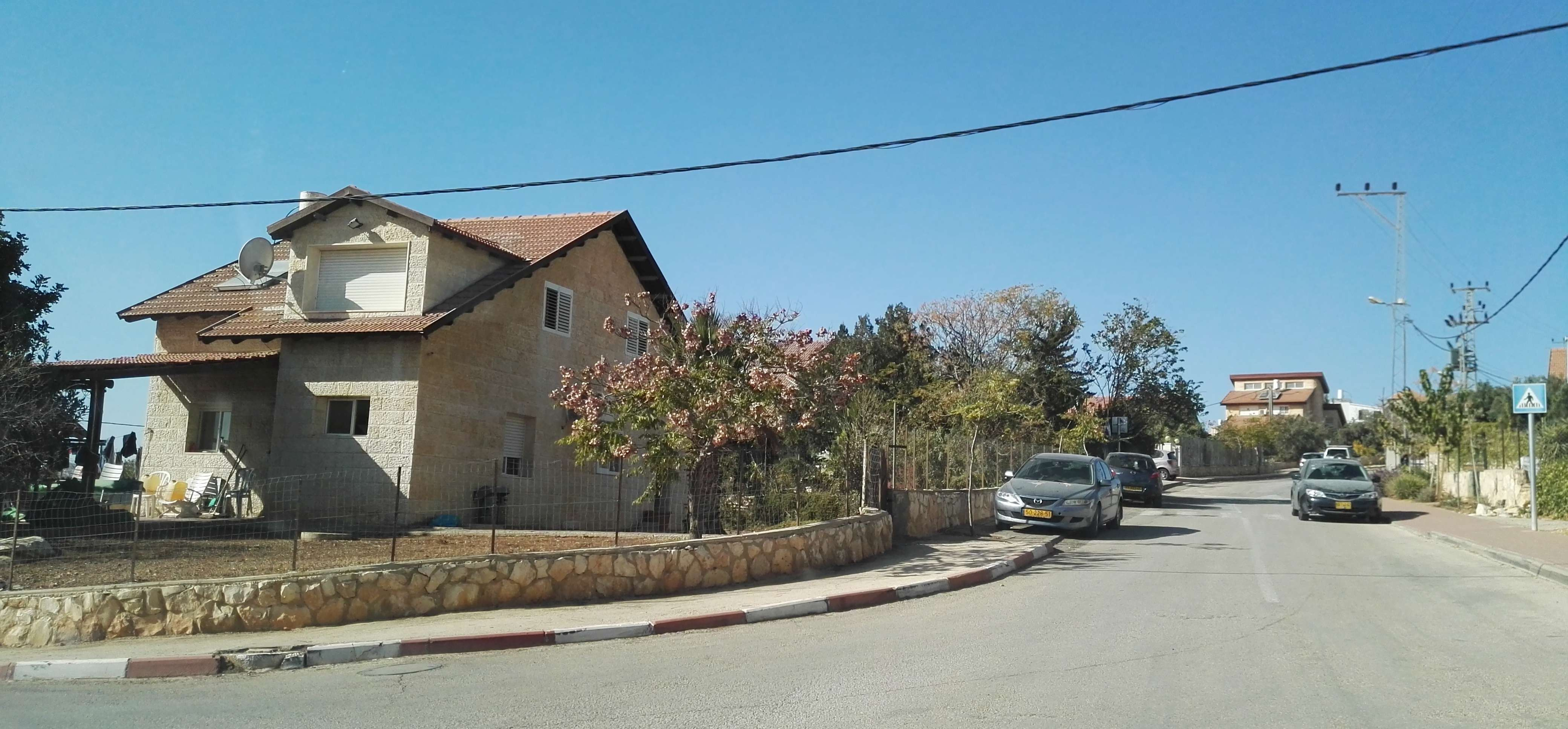

- Location within the Central West Bank
- Coordinates: 31°56′03″N 35°20′24″E
- Country: Palestine
- District: Judea and Samaria Area
- Council: Mateh Binyamin
- Region: West Bank
- Affiliation: Agricultural Union
- Founded: 1977
- Founder: Nahal
- Population (2024): 674

Rimonim (Hebrew: רִמּוֹנִים, רימונים), is an Israeli settlement in the West Bank. Located on the Allon Road, about a twenty-minute drive north-east from Jerusalem, it falls under the jurisdiction of Mateh Binyamin Regional Council. In 2024 it had a population of 674.

The international community considers Israeli settlements in the West Bank illegal under international law, but the Israeli government disputes this.

== Etymology ==
The village is named after the biblical Rock of Rimmon (present-day Rammun). The name comes from the Book of Judges: "But six hundred men turned and fled toward the wilderness unto the rock of Rimmon, and abode in the rock of Rimmon four months" (Judges, 20:47).

== History ==
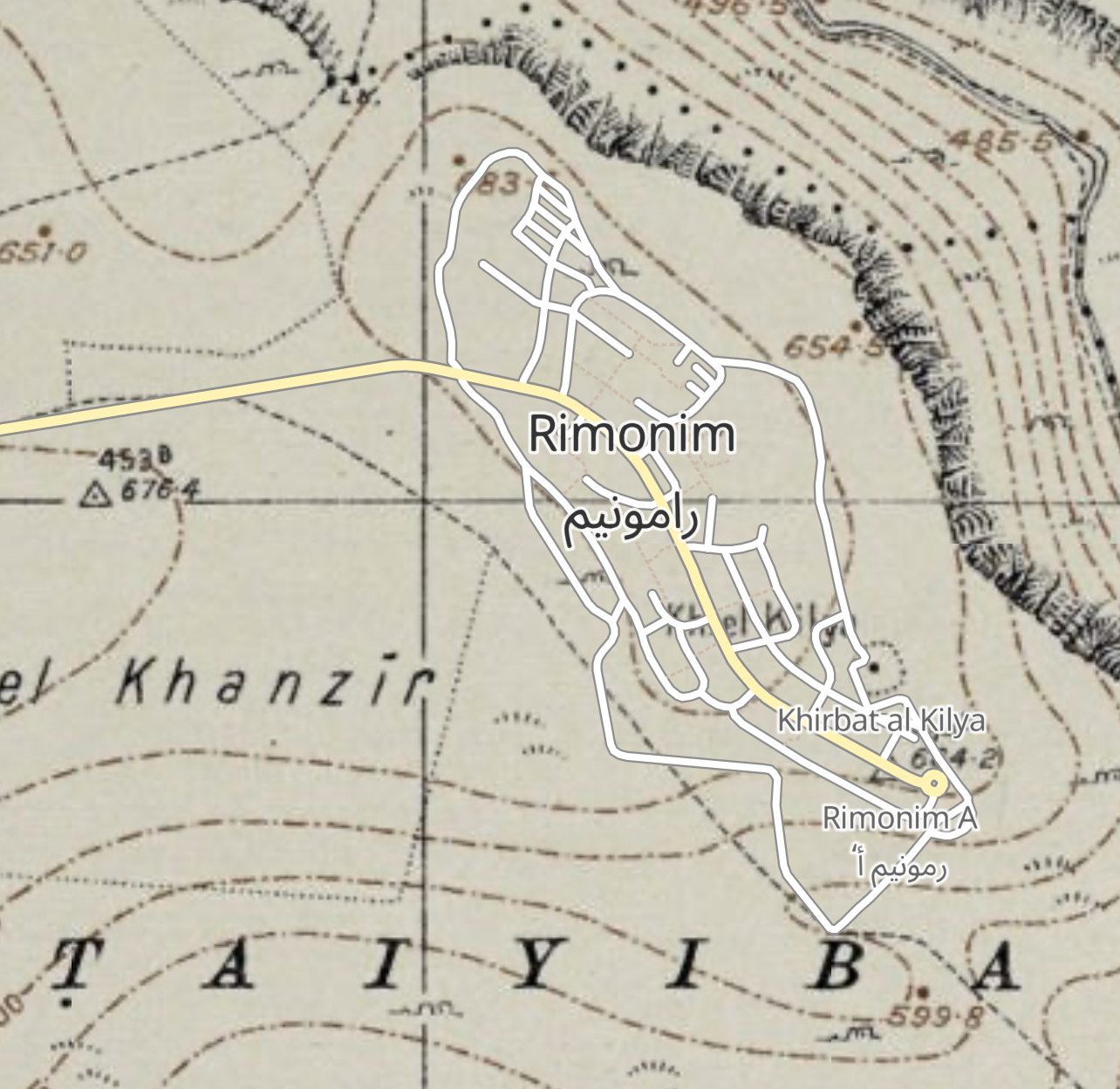
In 1977 the Israeli settlement of Rimonim was built immediately adjacent to the archaeological site of Khirbet el-Kiliya.

According to ARIJ, Israel confiscated 393 dunam of land from the nearby Palestinian town of Taybeh in order to construct Rimonim in 1977.

Rimonim was established in 1977 (20 Shevat 5737) as a temporary pioneer Nahal military outpost. Three years later in 1980 (on 4 Tishrei 5741), it moved to the current location, demilitarized and turned over to residential purposes non-religious Jewish Israelis with help from the Amana settlement organization. In the mid-2000s the village allowed religious Jews to move in. Until then, it had been almost exclusively secular in nature.

Services provided include a synagogue and mikveh, a half-Olympic sized swimming pool, post office, nursery, kindergarten, library, basketball court, and youth centre.

At the edge of town, there is a look-out point, from which one can view the Jordan Valley and the Dead Sea.

== Archaeology ==
The settlement includes the ancient Roman and Byzantine ruins of Khirbet el-Kiliya, including a coenobium-type monastery built in a Late Roman period fortress.

== Notable residents ==
- Amihai Eliyahu (born 1979), Otzma Yehudit politician; Minister of Heritage since 2022
