= Yishuv HaDa'at =

- Location within the Central West Bank
- Coordinates: 32°2′50.3″N 35°20′19.03″E
- Country: Palestine
- District: Judea and Samaria Area
- Council: Mateh Binyamin
- Region: West Bank
- Founded: 2001, legalized 2026
- Founder: Nati Rom

Yishuv HaDa'at (Hebrew: יִשּׁוּב הַדַּעַת, lit. 'Settlement of the Mind') is an Israeli settlement in the West Bank. Located near Shilo, it falls under the jurisdiction of the Mateh Binyamin Regional Council.

It was established in 2001 by Nati Rom, and legalized by the Israeli government in March 2026.

The international community considers Israeli settlements in the West Bank illegal under international law, but the Israeli government disputes this.
