= Ma'ale Shlomo =

- Location within the Central West Bank
- Coordinates: 31.9494°N 35.3441°E
- Country: Palestine
- District: Judea and Samaria Area
- Council: Mateh Binyamin
- Region: West Bank

Ma'ale Shlomo (Hebrew: מַעֲלֶה שְׁלֹמֹה, lit. 'Solomon's Ascent') is an Israeli outpost in the West Bank. Located to the south of Kokhav HaShahar, it falls under the jurisdiction of the Mateh Binyamin Regional Council.

The international community considers Israeli settlements in the West Bank illegal under international law, but the Israeli government disputes this.

== History ==
It was named after Shlomo Alba, an agronomist from the Kokhav HaShahar settlement. It was established in 1999 and is situated 1.1 km outside the boundaries of the parent settlement (Kochav HaShahar). It has contains 18 structures, with 19 caravans. 15 families live there.

In 2020, Israeli security forces removed two tents at an illegal outpost in Ma’ale Shlomo.
