= Ro'i =

Israeli settlement in the West Bank

Ro'i: רוֹעִ״י (Hebrew)
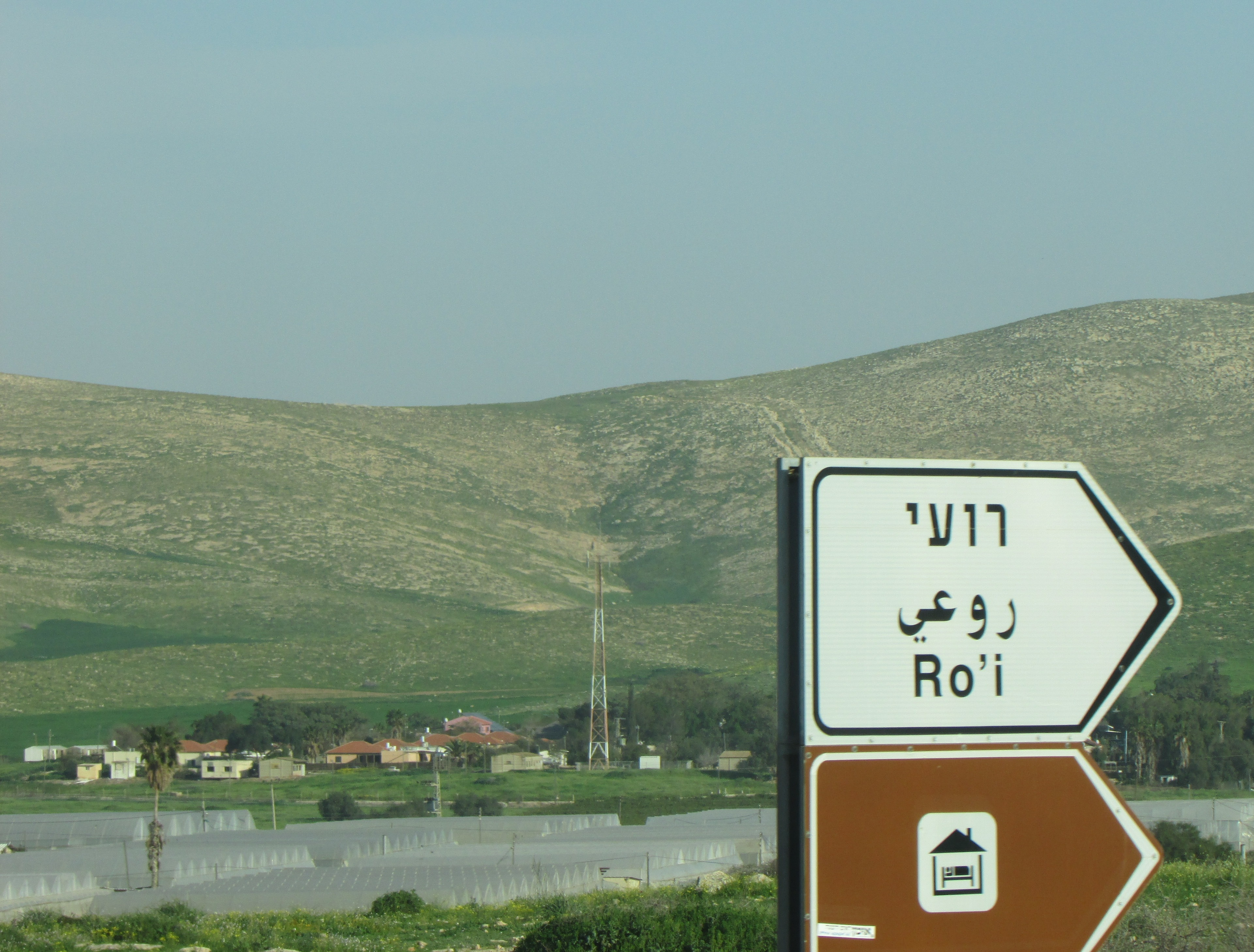

- Location within the Northern West Bank
- Coordinates: 32°14′50″N 35°29′20″E
- Country: Palestine
- District: Judea and Samaria Area
- Council: Bik'at HaYarden
- Region: West Bank
- Affiliation: Agricultural Union
- Founded: 1976
- Founder: Nahal
- Population (2024): 147

Ro'i (Hebrew: רוֹעִ״י) is an Israeli settlement organized as a moshav in the West Bank. Located in the Jordan Valley, it falls under the jurisdiction of Bik'at HaYarden Regional Council. In 2024 it had a population of 147.

The international community considers Israeli settlements in the West Bank illegal under international law, but the Israeli government disputes this.

== History ==
The village was established in September 1976 as a Nahal settlement, and was converted to a civilian moshav two years later. Its name is an acronym for Ramat Uzi Yairi, a former commander of the IDF's Paratroopers Brigade who was killed in the Savoy Operation in 1975. Ro'i in Hebrew also means "my shepherd", a given description of God, as in Psalm 23 "the Lord is my shepherd".
