= Maskiot =

Israeli settlement in the West Bank

Maskiot: מַשְׂכִּיּוֹת (Hebrew)

Hebrew transcription(s)
  - Standard: Maskiyot
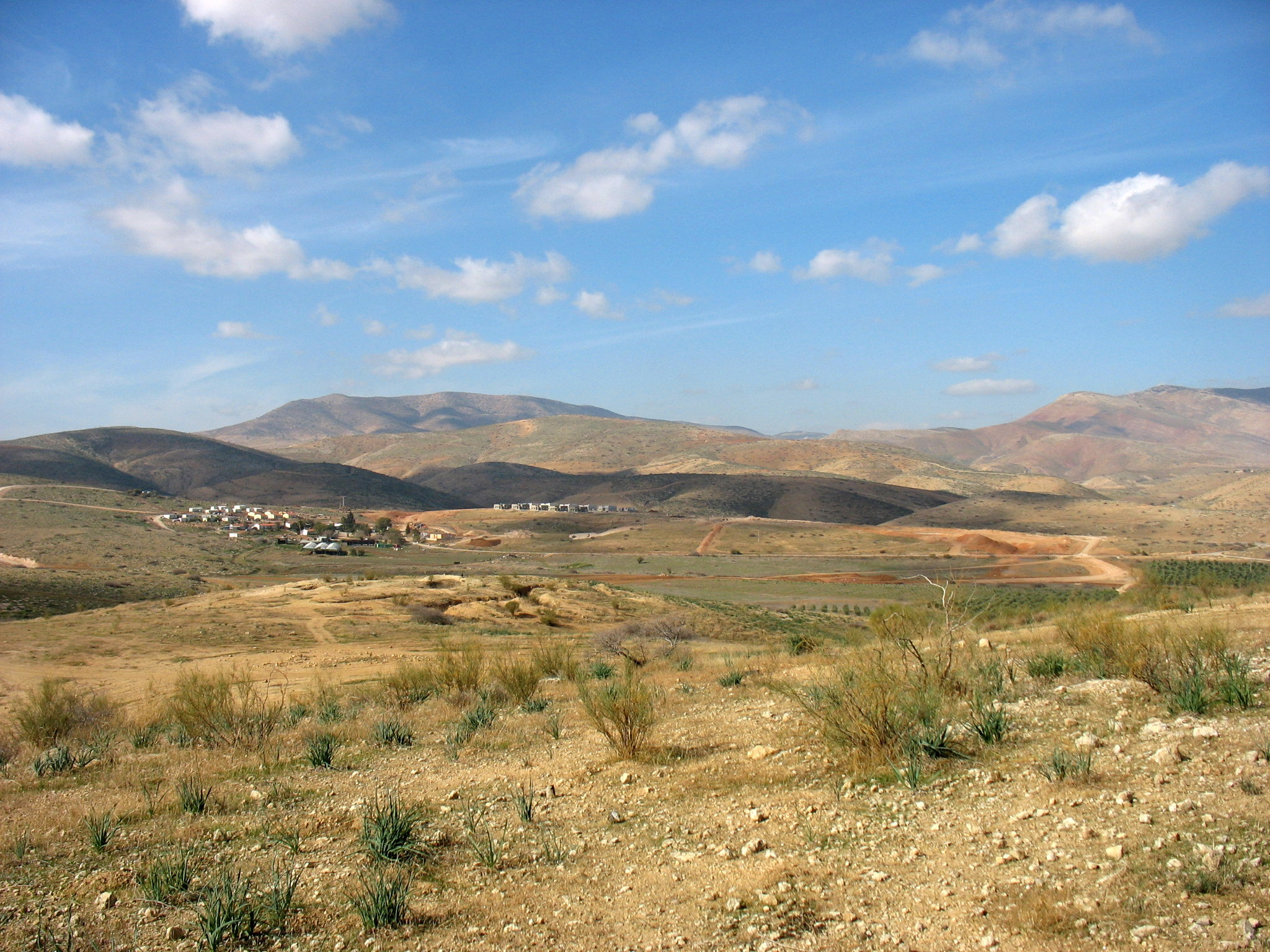

- Location within the Northern West Bank
- Coordinates: 32°19′3″N 35°30′8″E
- Country: Palestine
- District: Judea and Samaria Area
- Council: Bik'at HaYarden
- Region: West Bank
- Founded: 1986
- Founder: Nahal
- Population (2024): 397

Maskiot (Hebrew: מַשְׂכִּיּוֹת, lit. Artful Bowls) is an Israeli settlement in the West Bank. Located in the northern Jordan Valley, it falls under the jurisdiction of Bik'at HaYarden Regional Council. In 2024, it had a population of 397.

The international community considers Israeli settlements in the West Bank illegal under international law, but the Israeli government disputes this.

== History ==
Maskiot was established as a Nahal settlement in 1986 and was takes its name from a verse in the Bible (Proverbs 25:11): "A word aptly spoken is like apples of gold in settings of silver."

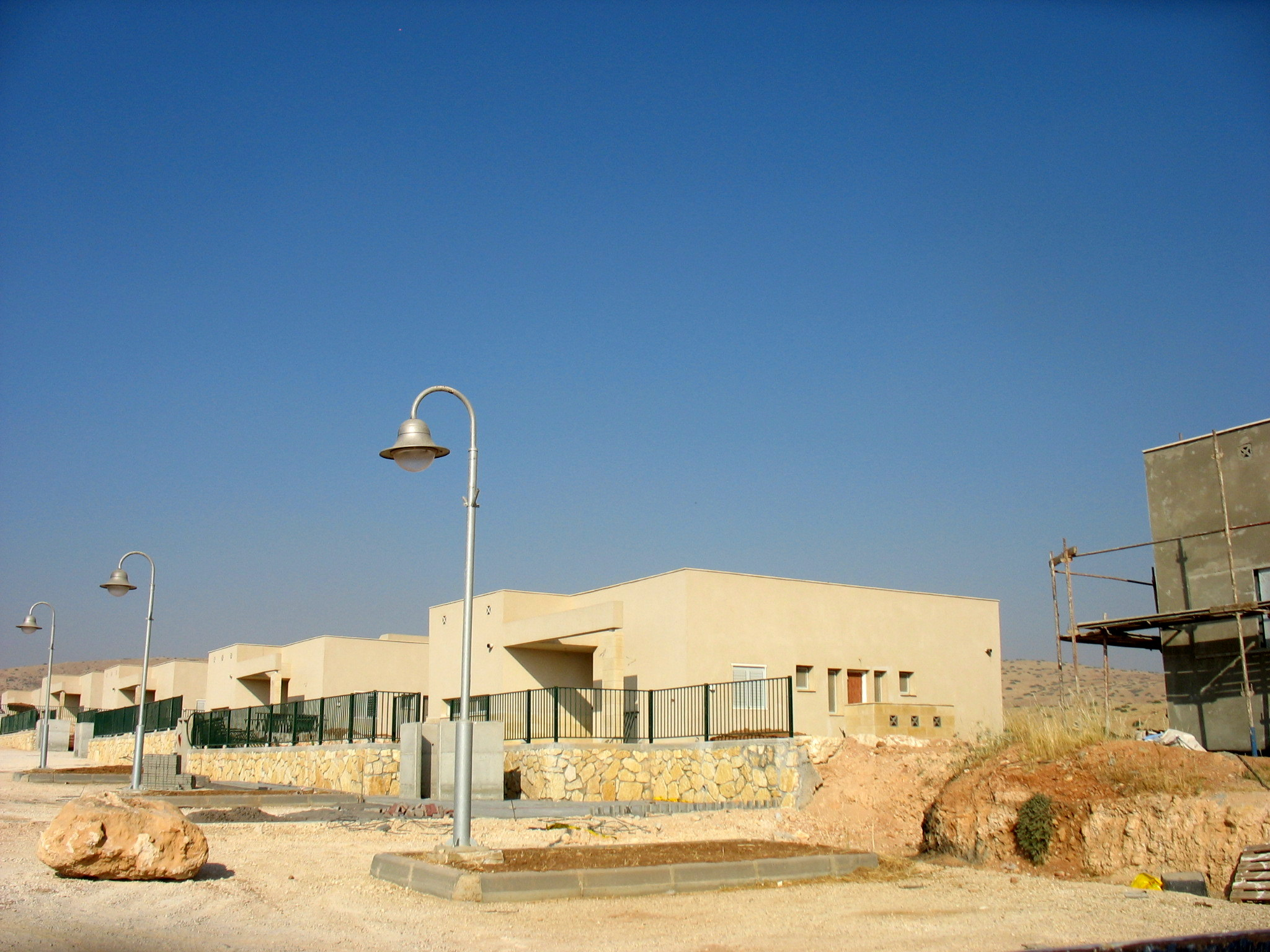
Houses in Maskiot

In 2006, a plan to expand Maskiot was put on hold following international backlash. In July 2008, a plan to expand Maskiot by building 20 new houses was made public. According to Israeli Radio, the expansion was part of a deal between settlers in Israeli Outposts established without the permission of the Israeli Government and the Israeli Defense Ministry. The new houses were planned to accommodate Gush Katif evacuees as part of the Israeli disengagement from Gaza. UN Secretary General Ban Ki-moon said he was "deeply concerned" over the new Maskiot plan, whereas the British government said it was "dismayed". A spokesman for US Secretary of State Condoleezza Rice said that the settlement expansion was "not helpful", and "inconsistent with Israel's commitment to the roadmap".
