= Beka'ot =

Israeli settlement in the West Bank

Beka'ot: בקעות (Hebrew)
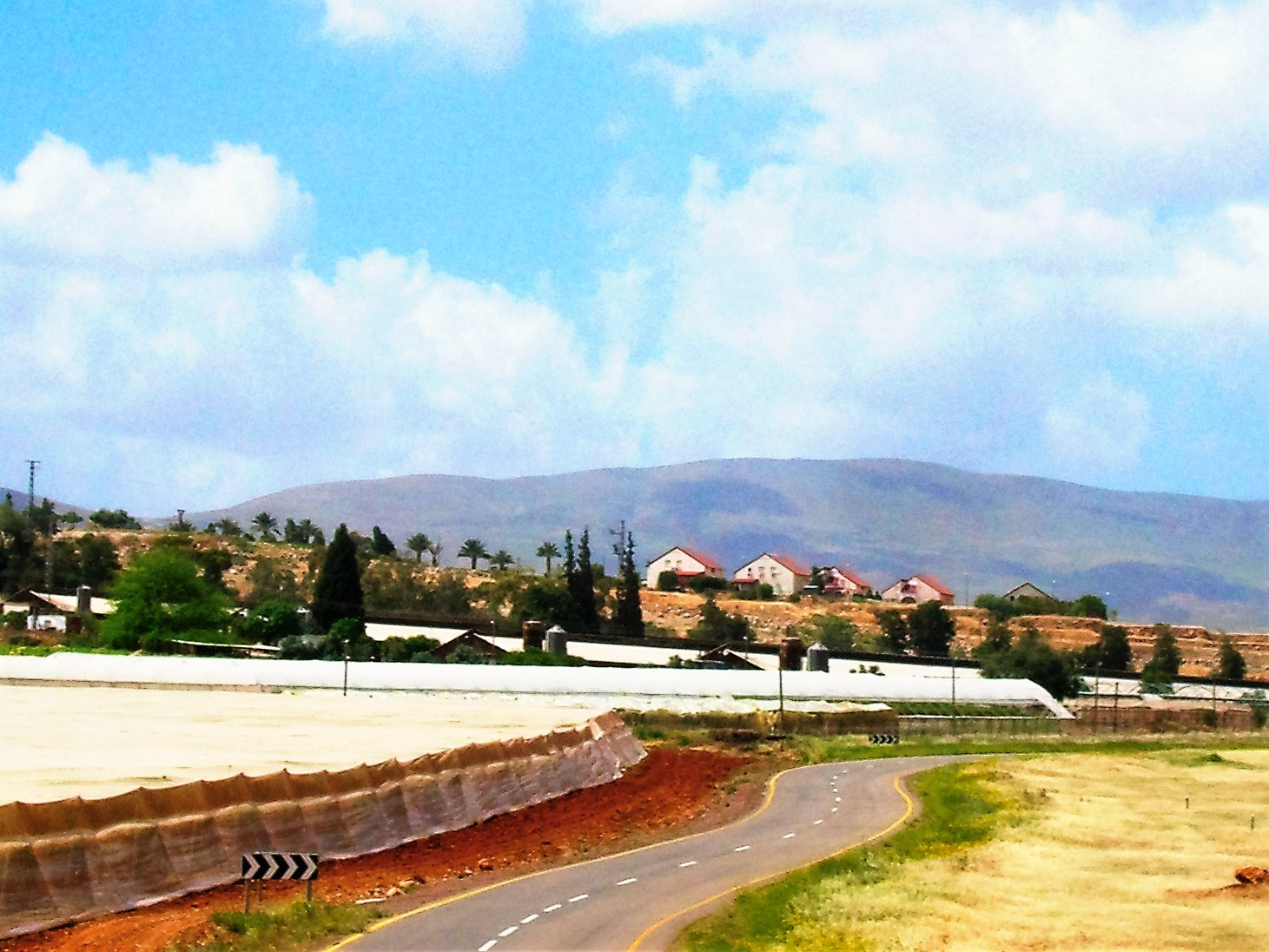
- Etymology: Valleys
- Location within the Northern West Bank Location within the West Bank
- Coordinates: 32°14′32″N 35°27′10″E
- Country: Palestine
- District: Judea and Samaria Area
- Council: Bik'at HaYarden
- Region: West Bank
- Affiliation: Agricultural Union
- Founded: 1972
- Population (2024): 254

Beka'ot (Hebrew: בקעות, lit. 'Valleys') is an Israeli settlement organized as a moshav in the West Bank. Located in the Jordan Valley with an area of 1,800 dunams, it falls under the jurisdiction of Bik'at HaYarden Regional Council. In 2024 it had a population of 254.

The international community considers Israeli settlements in the West Bank illegal under international law, but the Israeli government disputes this.

== History ==
The village was established in 1972, and was initially called Buka.

The Israel Defense Forces has a roadblock on the main highway leading to the moshav, known as the Beka'ot Checkpoint. It has been the scene of several fatal incidents; on 8 January 2011 a 20-year-old Palestinian man was shot dead while trying to throw a pipe bomb at soldiers. The previous week another Palestinian, aged 20, had been shot dead. On 26 June 2015 a 25-year-old armed Palestinian was shot dead, and on 9 January 2016 two Palestinian men, aged 23 and 38, were shot dead attempting to stab IDF soldiers.
