= Ma'ale Efrayim =

Israeli settlement in the West Bank

Ma'ale Efraim: מַעֲלֵה אֶפְרַיִם; معلي افرايم
- Local council (from 1981)

Hebrew transcription(s)
  - ISO 259: Maˁle ʔepraym
  - Also spelled: Ma'ale Efraim, Maaleh Efraim (unofficial)
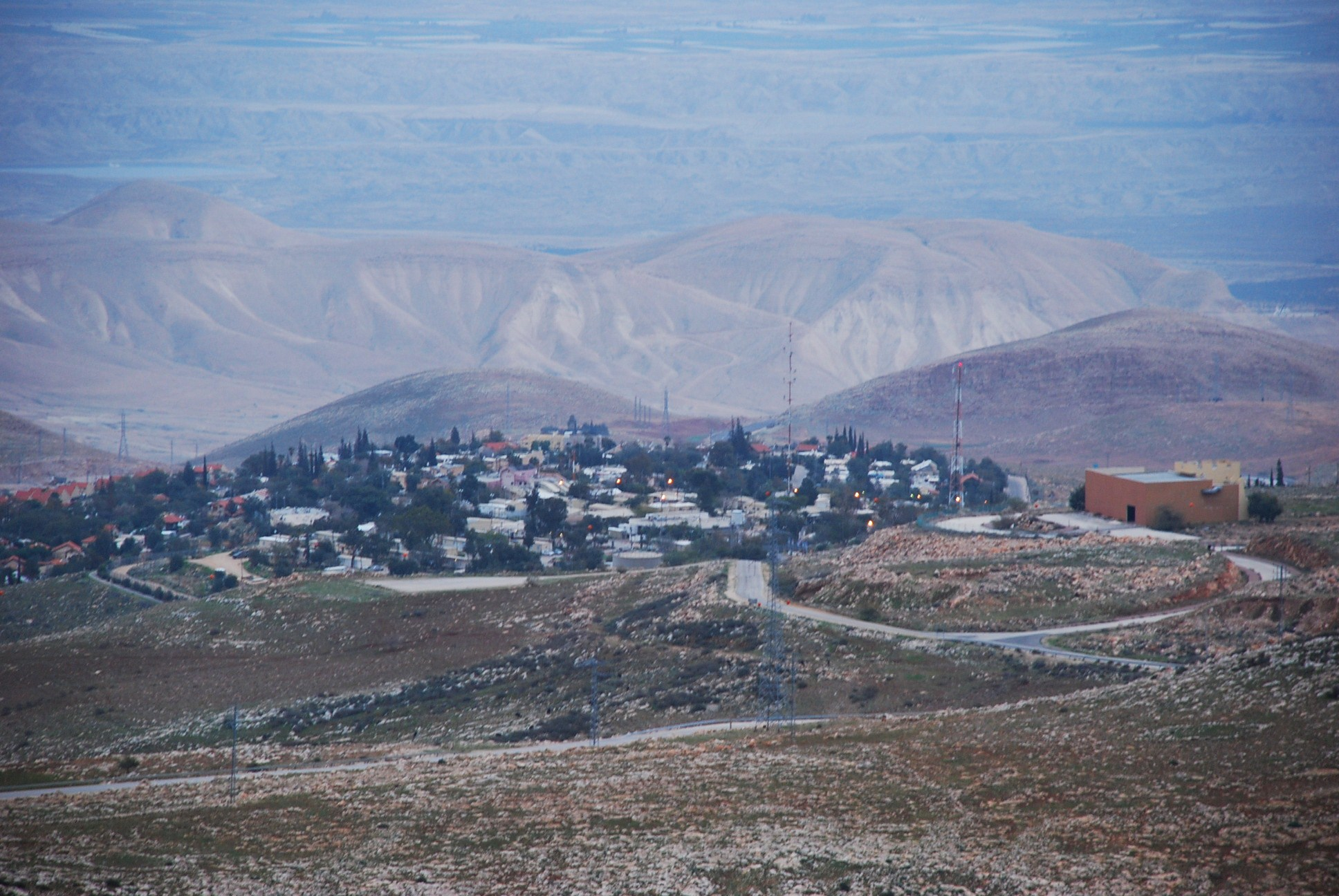
- View on Ma'ale Efraim from the west

- Location within the Central West Bank
- Coordinates: 32°4′13.54″N 35°24′13.01″E
- Region: West Bank
- District: Judea and Samaria Area
- Founded: 1978

Government
  - Head of Municipality: Shlomo Lalosh

Area
  - Total: 4,173 dunams (4.173 km^{2}; 1.611 sq mi)

Population (2024)
  - Total: 1,747
  - Density: 418.6/km^{2} (1,084/sq mi)

Ma'ale Efrayim (Hebrew: מַעֲלֵה אֶפְרַיִם, lit. Ascent of Ephraim) is an Israeli settlement in the West Bank, organized as a secular settlement and a local council, located along the eastern slopes of the Samarian mountains in the Jordan Valley. It was founded in 1978 and named after the Biblical tribe of Ephraim. The settlement's municipal status was upgraded to local council in 1981. In 2024, it had a population of 1,747.

The international community considers Israeli settlements in the West Bank illegal under international law, but the Israeli government disputes this.

== History ==
According to ARIJ, in 1970 Israel confiscated 1,464 dunams of land from nearby villages in order to construct Ma'ale Efrayim.
