= Judea and Samaria Area =

Israeli administrative division in the West Bank

Coordinates: 31°45′N 35°00′E

Judea and Samaria Area אֵזוֹר יְהוּדָה וְשׁוֹמְרוֹן يَهُودَا وَالسَّامِرَةِ
- Israeli administrative division
- Map of Israel and the Israeli-occupied territories, with the Judea and Samaria Area highlighted in red with hatching
- Interactive map of Judea and Samaria Area
- Control: Israel; Palestine
- Region: West Bank
- Named for: Judea, Samaria
- Capital: Ariel

Area
  - Total: 5,878 km^{2} (2,270 sq mi)

Population (2024)
  - Total: 529,455 residents (Israeli citizens only)

The Judea and Samaria Area (Hebrew: אֵזוֹר יְהוּדָה וְשׁוֹמְרוֹן, romanized: Ezor Yehuda VeShomron; (Note: Also an acronym: יו״ש (Yosh) or ש״י (Shai).) Arabic: يهودا والسامرة, romanized: Yahūda wa-s-Sāmara) is an administrative division used by Israel to refer to the entire West Bank, which has been occupied by Israel since 1967, but excludes East Jerusalem (see Jerusalem Law). Its area is split into 165 Palestinian "islands" that are under total or partial civil administration by the Palestinian National Authority (PNA), and a contiguous territory of Area C containing 230 Israeli settlements into which Israeli law is "pipelined".

While the area is widely recognized internationally as a part of Palestine, some Israeli authorities group it together with the districts of Israel proper, largely for statistical purposes.

== Terminology ==
=== Historical and biblical significance ===
The Judea and Samaria Area covers a portion of the territory designated by the historical and biblical names of Judea and Samaria. Both names are tied to the ancient Israelite kingdoms: the former corresponds to part of the Kingdom of Judah, also known as the Southern Kingdom; and the latter corresponds to part of the Kingdom of Israel, also known as the Northern Kingdom. In 1947, the terminology was noted by the United Nations in the Partition Plan for Palestine with the statement: "the boundary of the hill country of Samaria and Judea starts on the Jordan River..." The modern term used by the Israeli government does not map precisely with the geography of the historical/biblical areas, which in tradition extended beyond the West Bank to include Beersheba and Caesarea.

=== 1967 Arab–Israeli War ===
The Six-Day War in 1967 saw Israeli forces capture the Jordanian-annexed West Bank, marking the beginning of the ongoing Israeli occupation of the territory. Following its capture, right-wing Israelis began to refer to the territories by their Hebrew-language names and argued for their integration into Israel on historical, religious, nationalist, and security grounds. In December 1967, the Israeli Military Governorate issued an order that stated: "the term 'Judea and Samaria region' shall be identical in meaning for all purposes to the term 'the West Bank Region'". By early 1968, "Judea and Samaria" had been formally adopted in official usage. However, the phrase was rarely used until 1977, when Menachem Begin, a proponent of extending Israel's sovereignty to the region, was elected as Israel's sixth prime minister.

The name Judea, when used in Judea and Samaria, refers to all of the area to the south of Jerusalem, including Gush Etzion and Har Hevron. The name Samaria, on the other hand, refers to all of the area to the north of Jerusalem. In 1980, East Jerusalem (a part of the West Bank) was effectively annexed by Israel and has since been under civilian administration; it is thus excluded from the administrative structure of the Judea and Samaria Area.

The names "West Bank" (הַגָּדָה הַמַּעֲרָבִית, HaGadah HaMaʽaravit) or, alternatively, "the territories" (השטחים, HaShtahim) are also current in Israeli usage. Generally, preference for one term over the other indicates the speaker's position on the Israeli political spectrum. Left-wingers, who view that the territory should fall under Palestinian control and evacuated of settlements through a peace agreement, prefer "West Bank"; conversely, right-wingers, who view that the territory should come under Israeli administration permanently, advocate the usage of "Judea and Samaria" (similar to the Derry/Londonderry name dispute in Northern Ireland).

== Status ==
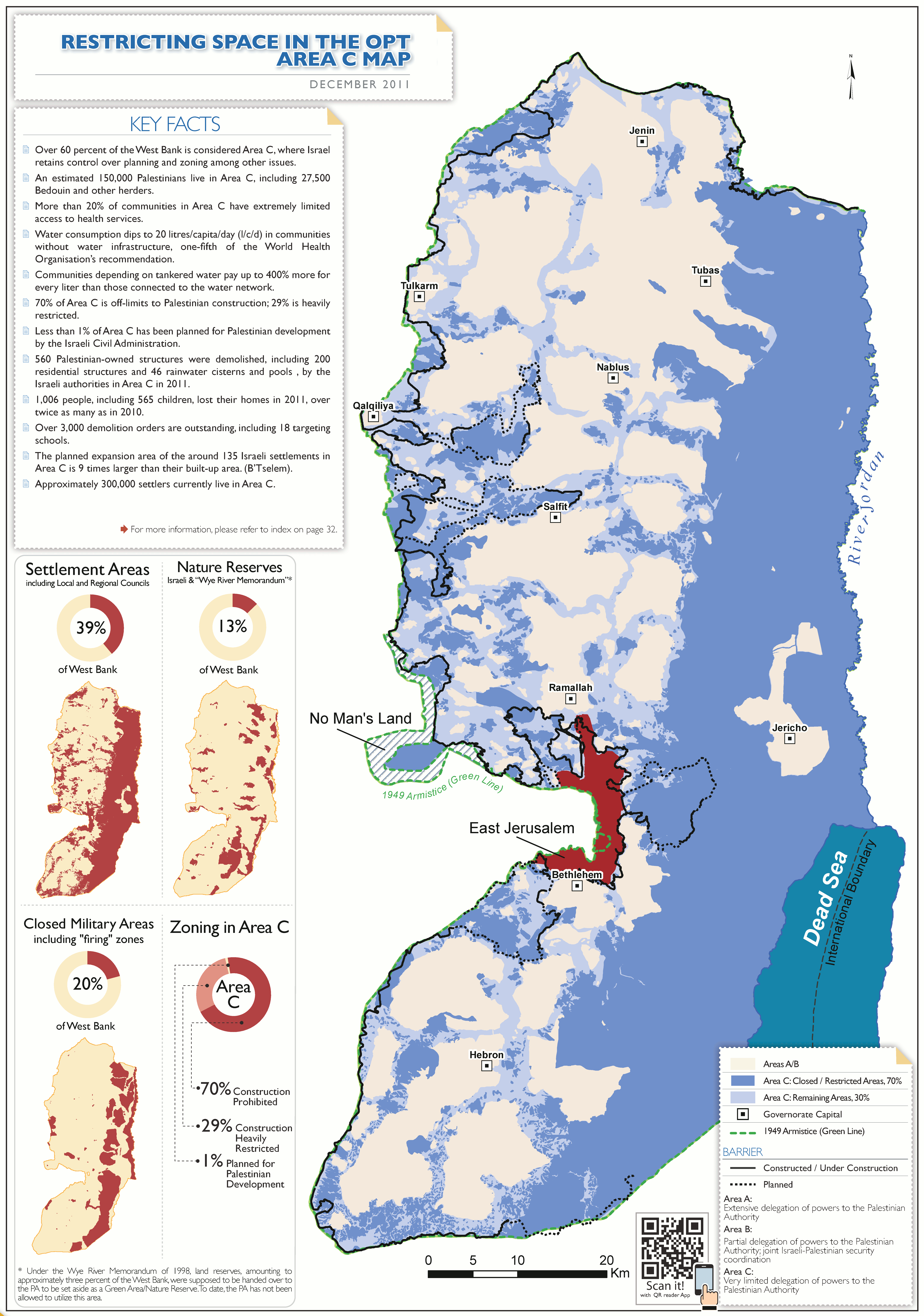
Area C, controlled by Israel under Oslo Accords, in blue and red

The Judea and Samaria Area is administered by the Israel Defense Forces Central Command, and military law is applied. The incumbent chief of Central Command is Aluf Avi Bluth. The civil administrative body is the Israeli Civil Administration.

The future status of the region is a key factor in the ongoing Israeli–Palestinian conflict.

United Nations Security Council Resolution 242, adopted in November 1967, after Israel captured the region from Jordan in the Six-Day War, lists as its first principle "the inadmissibility of the acquisition of territory by war and the need to work for a just and lasting peace in which every State in the area can live in security" and called for the "withdrawal of Israel armed forces from territories occupied in the recent conflict" in conjunction with the "termination of all claims or states of belligerency and respect for and acknowledgment of the sovereignty, territorial integrity and political independence of every State in the area and their right to live in peace within secure and recognized boundaries free from threats or acts of force".

The West Bank (including East Jerusalem) and Gaza Strip are considered occupied Palestinian territories by the United Nations, the United States, the International Court of Justice, the European Union, and by non-governmental organizations such as Amnesty International, Human Rights Watch, and B'Tselem. The Supreme Court of Israel has considered the section of the West Bank which excludes East Jerusalem to be Israeli-occupied territories.

On 13 May 2012, a bill to extend Israeli law to the Israeli settlements in the Judea and Samaria Area initiated by Knesset member Miri Regev (Likud) first approved by the majority of the Ministerial Committee for Legislation was rejected in a second round of votes after prime minister Benjamin Netanyahu had instructed his ministers to vote against the bill. Extending Israeli law to the settlements would mean a de facto annexation of the settlements to Israel. In July 2012, a government-commissioned report from a three-member committee, called Levy Report, asserted, based on a number of reasons, that there is no legal basis under international law to refer to Judea and Samaria as "occupied territory". Article 43 of the Fourth Hague Convention of 1907 is the basis of the Levy committee's opinion.

In April 2026, the Tennessee General Assembly passed House Bill 1446 and Senate Bill 1663, requiring state agencies to use the term "Judea and Samaria" instead of "West Bank" in official materials. The legislation became Chapter 877 of the Tennessee Public Acts of 2026 and will be effective after July 1 (2026).

== Demographics ==
Historical population
Year	Pop.	±%
1983	21,700	—
1995	122,300	+463.6%
2008	280,670	+129.5%
2022	480,999	+71.4%
2024	514,496	+7.0%

== Administrative local authorities ==
The area is further divided into eight military administrative regions: Menashe (Jenin area), HaBik'a (Jordan Valley), Shomron (Shechem area, known in Arabic as Nablus), Efrayim (Tulkarm area), Binyamin (Ramallah/al-Bireh area), Maccabim (Maccabim area), Etzion (Bethlehem area) and Yehuda (Hebron area).

=== Israeli settlements ===
Cities	Local Councils	Regional Councils
Ariel; Betar Illit; Giv'at Ze'ev; Ma'ale Adumim; Modi'in Illit	Alfei Menashe; Beit Aryeh-Ofarim; Beit El; Efrat; Elkana; Har Adar; Immanuel; Karnei Shomron; Kedumim; Kiryat Arba; Ma'ale Efraim; Oranit; Shaar Shomron	Bik'at HaYarden; Gush Etzion; Har Hebron; Mateh Binyamin; Megilot Dead Sea; Shomron

== See also ==
- West Bank, the internationally used name for Israel's Judea and Samaria Area
- State of Judea, a proposed Halakhic state in the West Bank
- Israeli Civil Administration, the Israeli governing body in parts of the West Bank
- List of burial places of Abrahamic figures
