= Petroleum Road (Negev) =

Road in the Negev, Israel

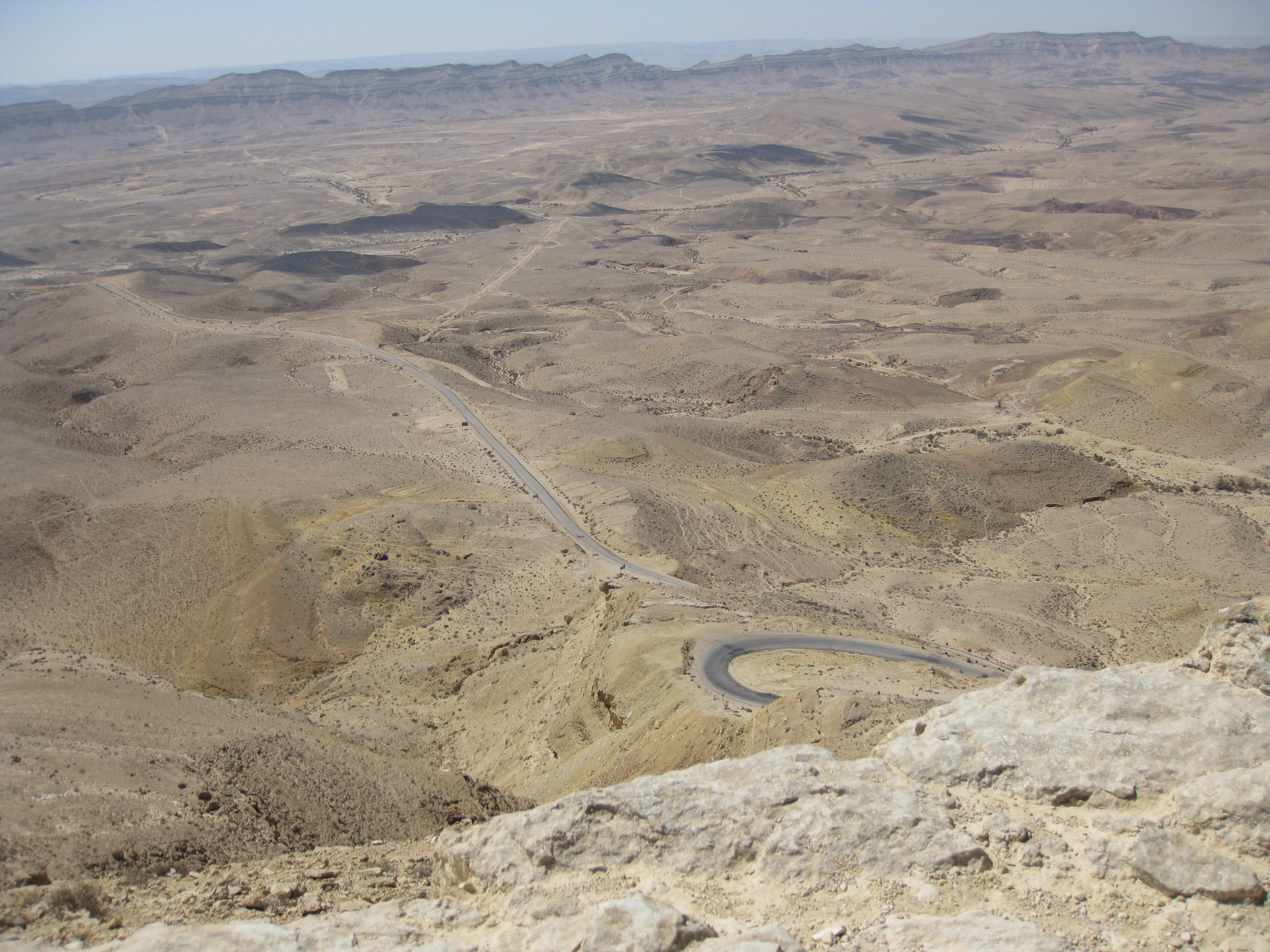
- The road in HaMakhtesh HaGadol. The dirt path leading to the right from the paved road to the drilling area is visible in the center of the photo.

Route information
- Length: 23 km (14 mi)
- Existed: 1941–present

Major junctions
- West end: HaNegev Junction
- East end: Nahal Hatira

Location
- Country: Israel

Highway system
- Roads in Israel; Highways
← Route 222	Route 224	→ Route 225

The Petroleum Road or Tapline Road (Hebrew: כביש הנפט, Kvish HaNeft) is a transverse road that was paved in 1941 by the Iraq Petroleum Company, hence its name. Today the route is marked as Route 224 in the western part connecting the Negev junction to Yeruham, a short section on Route 204 in the middle, and Route 225 in the eastern part, from Yeruham to HaMakhtesh HaGadol. Added to these is a dirt road about two kilometres long inside HaMakhtesh HaGadol.

== History ==
According to the geological theories, there were good chances of finding a petroleum trap trapped above the groundwater in Hatira Ridge where HaMakhtesh HaGadol resides. The makhtesh itself is a kind of "natural bore" that brings the surface of the ground closer to the oil deposits. In the 1940s, the Iraq Petroleum Company began oil exploration in HaMakhtesh HaGadol, and for that purpose, paved the road in 1941 and established a labour camp on Har Avnon on the northern rim of the makhtesh. The searches yielded no findings and were finally stopped. The road leading east to Scorpions Pass was used for years as the only land road to Eilat.

In February 1973, a section of Highway 40 was opened from Mashabei Sadeh to Sde Boker, and the crossing on Route 224 on the way to Mitzpe Ramon was made redundant. As a result, the Petroleum road was closed and the traffic to Yeruham passed on the northern section of Route 204. This lengthened the road from Yeruham to Neot Hovav, and harmed the employment opportunities of the town's residents.

In November 1980, after much pressure from the leaders of Yeruham, the renovation of Route 224 was started in order to reopen it, but after two years the contractor went out of business after completing two thirds of the road. Following this, the uncompleted road was opened, and the people of Yeruham continued to demand its completion. In April 1986, the government decided to complete the construction of the road.

Towards the end of 2008, Route 225 was closed to traffic due to safety deficiencies and because the road has not been maintained for many years, but it was reopened to traffic due to an appeal by the Society for the Protection of Nature in Israel to the Minister of Transportation Israel Katz based on the fact that the road being closed to traffic "prevents access to one of the most beautiful landscapes in Israel." At the same time, the National Roads Company of Israel began allocating road safety improvements.

== Junctions (West to East) ==
District	Location	km	mi	Name	Destinations	Notes
Southern	Camp Ariel Sharon	0	0.0	צומת הנגב (HaNegev Junction)	Highway 40	
Southern	Yeruham	12	7.5	צומת גבעת ירוחם (Givat Yeruham Junction)	Route 204	Road continues along Route 204
Southern	Yeruham	12.5	7.8	צומת ירוחם (Yeruham Junction)	Route 225	Road continues along Route 225
Southern	HaMakhtesh HaGadol	21	13	צומת ללא שם (Unnamed Junction)	Dirt road	Road continues along a dirt road
Southern	HaMakhtesh HaGadol	23	14	צומת ללא שם (Unnamed Junction)	Nahal Hatira	
1.000 mi = 1.609 km; 1.000 km = 0.621 mi: Route transition

== See also ==
- List of highways in Israel
