= Route 206 (Israel) =

Route in Israel

Route 206
- כביש 206

Route information
- Length: 16.4 km (10.2 mi)

Major junctions
- South end: Oron Industrial Park
- North end: Rotem Junction

Location
- Country: Israel

Highway system
- Roads in Israel; Highways
← Route 204	→ Route 211

Route 206 is a regional road in the Negev, between HaMakhtesh HaGadol and HaMakhtesh HaKatan. The road is mainly used by the workers of the Oron and Tzin phosphate mine industrial parks near the southern end of the road, and the travellers on the hiking trails near the road.

== Junctions (South to North) ==
District	Location	km	mi	Name	Destinations	Notes
Southern	Oron Industrial Park	0.00	0.00	ללא שם (Unnamed)	Access road to phosphate mines	
No access to the south
Southern	HaMakhtesh HaGadol	4.08	2.54	צומת יורקעם (Yorke'am Junction)	Route 225	
Southern	Mishor Yamin	6.40	3.98	צומת נחל מעלה (Nahal Ma'ale Junction)	Route 227	
Southern	Rotem Factories	16.05	9.97	צומת רותם (Rotem Junction)	Highway 25	
1.000 mi = 1.609 km; 1.000 km = 0.621 mi

== See also ==
- List of highways in Israel
