= Route 293 (Israel) =

Road in Israel

Route 293
- כביש 293

Route information
- Length: 18.5 km (11.5 mi)

Major junctions
- West end: HaGadi Junction
- East end: Kama Interchange

Location
- Country: Israel

Highway system
- Roads in Israel; Highways
← Route 264	→ Route 310

Route 293 is a rural road that connects Highway 40 to Netivot and to Route 34 and Highway 25. Many Kibbutzim and Moshavim are along its path.

== Junctions (West to East) ==
District	Location	km	mi	Name	Destinations	Notes
Southern	Netivot	0	0.0	צומת הגדי (HaGadi Junction)	Highway 25; Road 2444	
Southern	Beit HaGadi	0.4	0.25	צומת הגדי (HaGadi Junction)	Entrance to Beit HaGadi	
Southern	Talmei Bilu	4	2.5	צומת תלמי ביל"ו (Talmei Bilu Junction)	Road 2930; Road 2931	
Southern	Mabu'im	5.5	3.4	צומת ניר עקיבא (Nir Akiva Junction)	Road 2932	
Southern	Mabu'im	6	3.7	צומת מבועים (Mabu'im Junction)	Entrance to Mabu'im	
Southern	Eshbol	8	5.0	צומת אשבול (Eshbol Junction)	Road 2934	
Southern	Klahim	9	5.6	צומת קלחים (Klahim Junction)	Road 2935	
Southern	Pa'amei Tashaz	10	6.2	צומת פעמי תש"ז (Pa'amei Tashaz Junction)	Road 2936	
Southern	Sde Tzvi	12	7.5	צומת שדה צבי (Sde Tzvi Junction)	Road 2937	
Southern	Sde Tzvi	13	8.1	צומת שדה צבי (Sde Tzvi Junction)	Route 334	
Southern	Beit Kama	17.5	10.9	צומת קמה (Kama Junction)	Route 264	
Southern	Beit Kama	18.5	11.5	מחלף קמה (Kama Interchange)	Highway 6 Highway 40	
1.000 mi = 1.609 km; 1.000 km = 0.621 mi

== See also ==
- List of highways in Israel
