= Highway 25 (Israel) =

Road in Israel

Coordinates: 31°17′48″N 34°42′46″E

Highway 25
- כביש 25
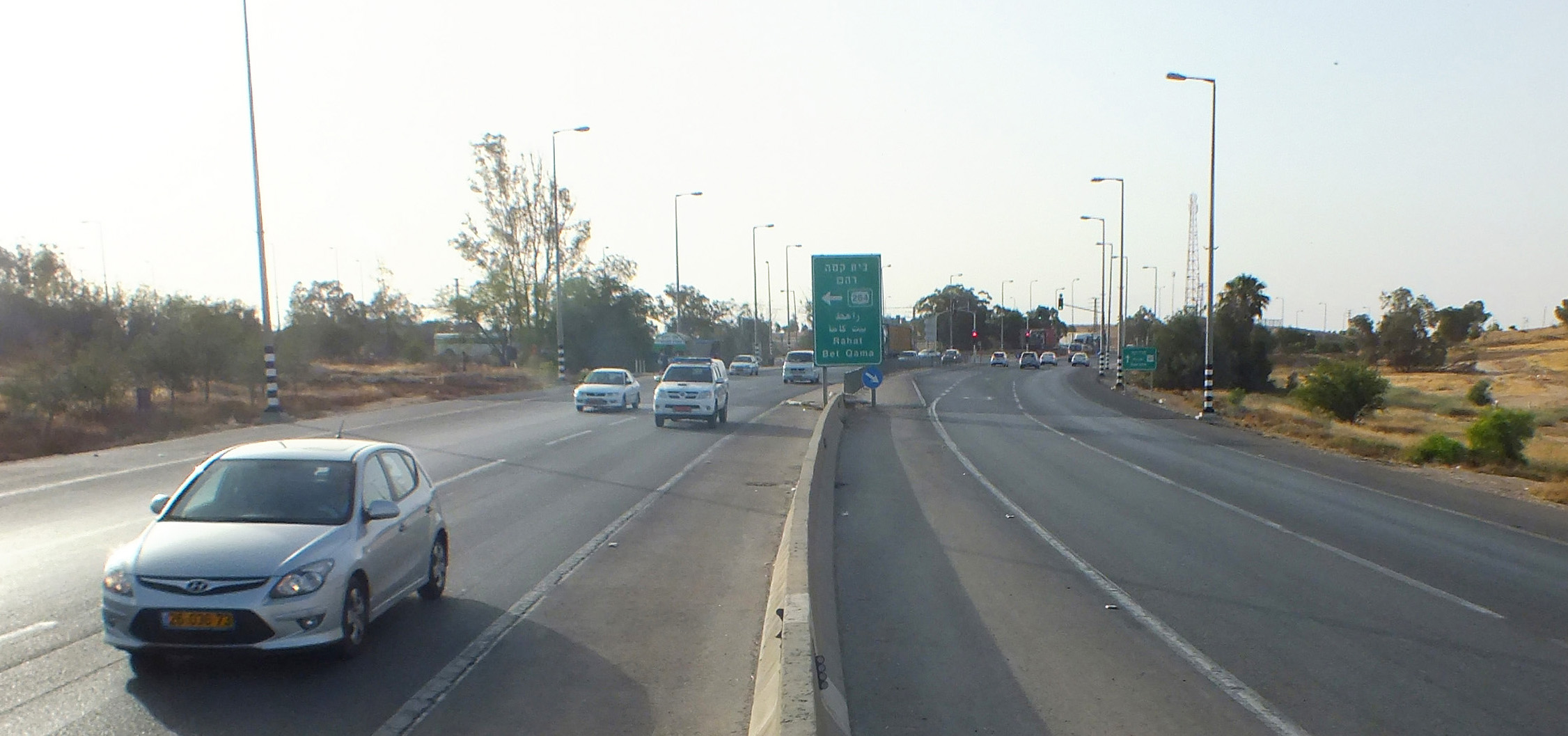

Route information
- Length: 113 km (70 mi)

Major junctions
- West end: Nahal Oz Border Crossing
- East end: HaArava Junction

Location
- Country: Israel

Highway system
- Roads in Israel; Highways
← Highway 23	→ Highway 31

Highway 25 is a rural highway in southern Israel. It begins northwest of Nahal Oz at the border with the Gaza Strip, and it passes through Netivot, Beersheba and Dimona. It continues southeast toward Arava Junction, where it meets Highway 90. Its length is estimated by the Israeli Department of Transportation as 172 km and 780 meters.

== Junctions & Interchanges ==
District	Location	km	mi	Name	Destinations	Notes
Southern	Near Nahal Oz	0	0.0	מעבר נחל עוז (Nahal Oz Crossing)	Access road to Karni Crossing	
Southern	Nahal Oz	1.3	0.81	צומת נחל עוז (Nahal Oz Junction)	Entrance to Nahal Oz	
Southern	Sa'ad	4	2.5	צומת סעד (Sa'ad Junction)	Route 232 (Northeast only)	
Southern	Sa'ad	4.5	2.8	צומת סעד (Sa'ad Junction)	Route 232 (Southwest only); Entrance to Sa'ad	
Southern	Zimrat	7.5	4.7	צומת זמרת (Zimrat Junction)	Road 2422	
Southern	Netivot	12	7.5	צומת נתיבות (Netivot Junction)	Highway 34	
Southern	Beit HaGadi	13.5	8.4	צומת הגדי (HaGadi Junction)	Route 293; Road 2444	
Southern	Tidhar	18	11	צומת תדהר (Tidhar Junction)	Entrance to Tidhar	
Southern	Brosh	20.5	12.7	צומת ברוש (Brosh Junction)	Road 2544	
Southern	Galit	24	15	צומת גילת (Galit Junction)	Route 241	
Southern	Eshel HaNasi	28.5	17.7	צומת הנשיא (HaNasi Junction)	Route 264; Route 310	
Southern	Ofakim	32	20	צומת אופקים (Ofakim Junction)	Road 2411	
Southern	Beersheba	42	26	צומת הטייסים (Hatayasim Junction)	Road 2357	
Southern	Beersheba	42.5	26.4	צומת אלי כהן (Eli Cohen Junction)	Route 406	Northern end of concurrency with Route 406
Southern	Beersheba	43.5	27.0		Highway 60; Hebron Street	
Southern	Beersheba	44.5	27.7	צומת יצחק מצליח (Yitzhak Matzli'ah Junction)	Route 406	Southern end of concurrency with Route 406
Southern	Beersheba	47	29	מחלף שרה (Sarah Interchange)	Highway 40	
Southern	Nevatim	54	34	מחלף נבטים (Nevatim Interchange)	Highway 6	
Southern	Ar'ara BaNegev	65.5	40.7	צומת ערערה בנגב (Ar'ara BaNegev Junction)	Highway 80	
Southern	Dimona	77.5	48.2	צומת דימונה (Dimona Junction)	Route 204	
Southern	Rotem Factories	86.5	53.7	צומת רותם (Rotem Junction)	Route 206	
Southern	Rotem Factories	97	60	צומת צפית (Tzafit Junction)	Route 258	
Southern	Aravah	113	70	צומת הערבה (HaAravah Junction)	Highway 90	
1.000 mi = 1.609 km; 1.000 km = 0.621 mi: Closed/former; Concurrency terminus; Proposed

== Hazardous road ==
Highway 25 was declared as a red road by the Israeli police in 2015.

== See also ==
- List of highways in Israel
