= Route 200 (Israel) =

Route in Israel

Route 200
- כביש 200
- Ramla bypass road
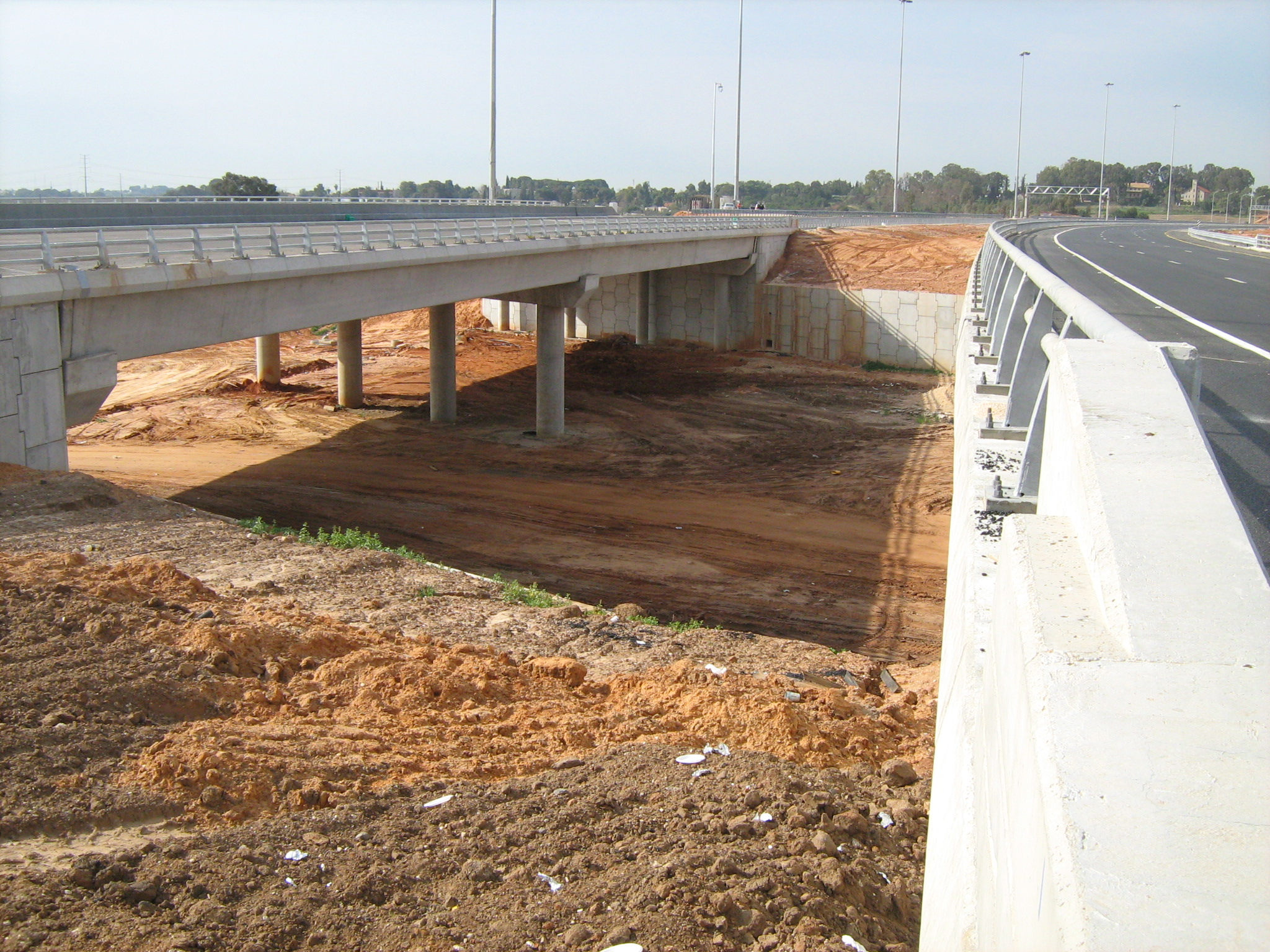
- Route 431 at the future West Ramla Interchange (January 2009)

Route information
- Length: 3.27 km (2.03 mi)
- Existed: 2020–present

Major junctions
- South end: West Ramla Interchange
- North end: North Ramla Interchange

Location
- Country: Israel
- Major cities: Ramla

Highway system
- Roads in Israel; Highways
← Route 171	→ Route 204

Route 200 (also known as the Ramla bypass road) is a regional road in Israel that connects Highway 44 and Route 431. It mainly serves the residents of the western neighbourhoods of the city of Ramla and in the future also the Gani Aviv neighbourhood, located in the city of Lod and the neighbourhoods that will be built on the Tzrifin area.

Part of the road was opened to traffic in May 2020.

There are plans to extend the road to the Gani Aviv neighbourhood in Lod, but as of 2022, the plan has not been advanced.

== Junctions (South to North) ==
District	Location	km	mi	Name	Destinations	Notes
Central	Ramla	0	0.0	מחלף רמלה מערב (West Ramla Interchange)	Route 431	
Central	Ramla	0.81	0.50	צומת ללא שם (Unnamed Junction)	Moshe Arens Boulevard	
Central	Ramla	1.45	0.90	צומת ללא שם (Unnamed Junction)	Moshe Levi Street	
Central	Ramla	1.67	1.04	צומת ללא שם (Unnamed Junction)	Ze'ev Jabotinsky Street	
Central	Ramla	1.94	1.21	צומת ללא שם (Unnamed Junction)	Moshe Dayan Street	
Central	Ramla	3.27	2.03	מחלף רמלה צפון (North Ramla Interchange)	Highway 44	
1.000 mi = 1.609 km; 1.000 km = 0.621 mi

== See also ==
- List of highways in Israel
