= Route 204 (Israel) =

Route in Israel

Route 204
- כביש 204

Route information
- Length: 30.4 km (18.9 mi)
- Existed: 1953–present

Major junctions
- South end: Halukim Junction
- North end: Dimona Junction

Location
- Country: Israel
- Major cities: Yeruham, Dimona

Highway system
- Roads in Israel; Highways
← Route 200	→ Route 206

Route 204 is a regional road in the Negev, Israel. It starts at the Halukim junction with Highway 40, passes by the town of Yeruham and ends at the Dimona junction on Highway 25, near Dimona.

== History ==
The southern section of the road, from Yeruham to the south, was broken by the IDF starting in 1951, as part of the construction of the road to Eilat through the Makhtesh Ramon. The road to Eilat was officially inaugurated in February 1954.

The northern section of the road was paved in 1952 and inaugurated in February 1953, as part of the construction of the Be'er Sheva - Sodom road. It was paved as a temporary detour connecting the road from Sodom to the Petroleum Road, thus delaying the expenses of paving Highway 25 from Dimona to Be'er Sheva. The road turned Yeruham into a major crossroads in the Negev in the 1950s and 1960s. The opening of Highway 25 from Be'er Sheva to Dimona reduced the use of the northern section of Route 204, while the southern section served as the main road to Eilat. In May 1961, the northern section was closed for a while for repairs and in 1963, the leaders of Dimona and Yeruham asked to renovate and expand it. However, the National Roads Company of Israel requested to pave a new road in place of the old road and therefore they did not repair or build bridges on it, to prevent its closure due to floods. In January 1966, the road was described:

The 14 kilometer section between Dimona and Yeruham does not deserve to be called a road at all. Remained there as a "souvenir" torn pieces of asphalt along the entire length, even without edges. Further on, there are about 4 kilometers that are good from Yeruham and again 15 kilometers that are very bad.

The widening of the road along its entire length was included in the National Roads Company of Israel plan for 1968 and again in the plan for 1969 and was implemented in 1969-1970. The road is considered preferable to the winding road of the Petroleum Road, especially after the widening of the road. In February 1973, a section of Highway 40 was opened from Mashabei Sadeh to Sde Boker and the passage on Route 204 became unnecessary. As a result, the Petroleum Road was closed and traffic to Yeruham passed on the northern section of Route 204.

== Junctions (South to North) ==
District	Location	km	mi	Name	Destinations	Notes
Southern	Sde Boker	0	0.0	צומת חלוקים (Halukim Junction)	Route 431	
Southern	Merhav Am	3.4	2.1	צומת מרחב עם (Merhav Am Junction)	Road 2042	
Southern	Yeruham	17.2	10.7	צומת ירוחם (Yeruham Junction)	Route 225	
Southern	Yeruham	17.8	11.1	צומת גבעת ירוחם (Givat Yeruham Junction)	Route 224	
Southern	Yeruham	20.3	12.6	צומת ירוחם צפון (North Yeruham Junction)	Vardimon Boulevard	
Southern	Dimona	30.4	18.9	צומת דימונה (Dimona Junction)	Highway 25	
1.000 mi = 1.609 km; 1.000 km = 0.621 mi

== See also ==
- List of highways in Israel
