= Route 264 (Israel) =

Route in Israel

Route 264
- כביש 264

Route information
- Length: 14.5 km (9.0 mi)

Major junctions
- South end: HaNasi Junction
- North end: Kama Junction

Location
- Country: Israel

Highway system
- Roads in Israel; Highways
← Route 258	→ Route 293

Route 264 is a north-south regional highway in southern Israel. It connects Highway 25 at HaNasi junction with Highway 40 at Kama junction. It is 14.5km long.

== Junctions (South to North) ==
District	Location	km	mi	Name	Destinations	Notes
Southern	Eshel Hanasi	0	0.0	צומת הנשיא (HaNasi Junction)	Highway 25; Route 310	
Southern	Mishmar HaNegev	5	3.1	צומת משמר הנגב (Mishmar HaNegev Junction)	Road 2641	
Southern	Rahat	6.5	4.0	צומת רהט דרום (South Rahat Junction)	Alsalam Street	
Southern	Shoval	10.5	6.5	צומת שובל (Shoval Junction)	Omar Al Mukhtar Street	
Southern	Beit Kama	14.5	9.0	צומת קמה (Kama Junction)	Route 293	
1.000 mi = 1.609 km; 1.000 km = 0.621 mi

== See also ==
- List of highways in Israel
