= Galit =

Galit (גלית) is a given name which may refer to:

- Galit Atlas (born 1971), Israeli-American psychoanalyst
- Galit Chait (born 1975), Israeli ice dancer
- Galit Dahan-Carlibach (born 1981), Israeli author
- Galit Devash (born 1986), Israeli volleyball player
- Galit Eilat (born 1965), Israeli curator and writer
- Galit Gutmann (born 1972), Israeli actor and fashion model
- Galit Hasan-Rokem (born 1945), professor of folklore at the Hebrew University of Jerusalem
- Galit Lahav (born 1973), Israeli-American Professor of Systems Biology at Harvard Medical School
- Galit Ronen (born 1969), Israeli diplomat
