= HaMakhtesh HaKatan =

Third largest makhtesh in Israel

Coordinates: 30°57′43″N 35°11′55″E

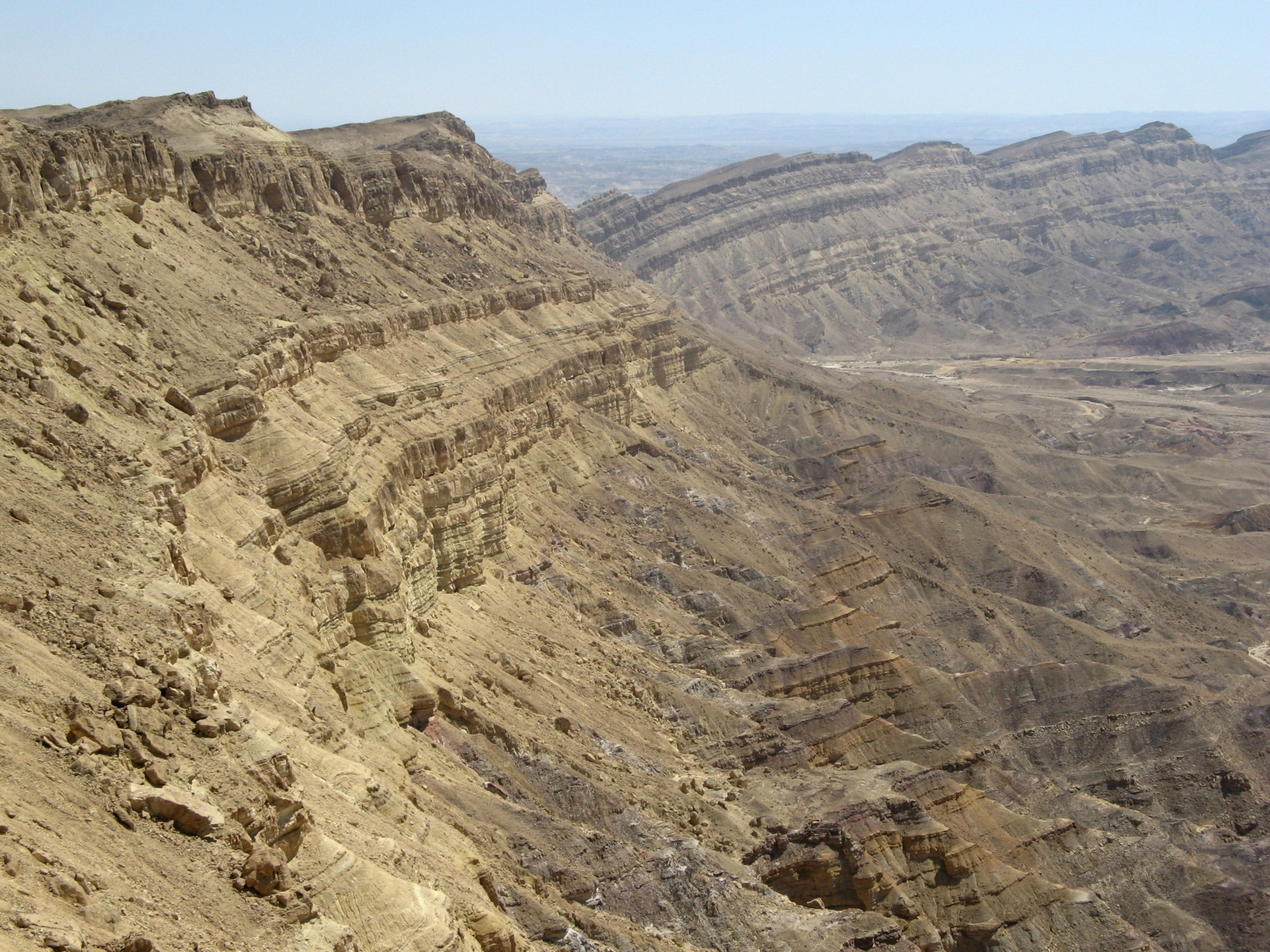
- Interactive map of HaMakhtesh HaKatan
- Location: Southern, Israel
- Length: 5 km (3.1 mi)
- Width: 7 km (4.3 mi)

HaMakhtesh HaKatan (Hebrew: הַמַּכְתֵּשׁ הַקָּטָן, lit. The Small Crater) or simply Makhtesh HaKatan or Makhtesh Katan, is a makhtesh, a geological erosional landform, situated in Israel's Negev desert. At 5 km by 7 km, it is the third largest of the five makhteshim in the Negev, from a total of seven known major makhteshim, of which two are in Egypt's Sinai desert. It was charted in 1942 by Jewish explorers.

In June 2019, the State of Israel declared the crater a nature reserve.

== Description ==
The shape of the crater is almost circular. Its maximum length reaches approximately 8 kilometers, its width about 6 kilometers, and its depth about 400 meters. There are two main trails descending into the crater: the first is "Ma'ale Eli" at the southwestern corner of the crater, coming from Ma'ale Akrabim; the second is "Ma'ale Hatira," which is part of an ancient trail that ascended from Nahal Zin (Zin River) to Metzad Tamar and descends at the northeastern side of the crater.

Nahal Hatira is the stream that drains the small crater towards Nahal Zin and the Arabah. The stream passes through an opening in the southeastern wall of the crater (known as the Gate of Asmodeus or the Devil's Gate), which is part of the Hatira Ridge. The small crater is known for its colorful sandstone. The color of the sandstone varies between gray, brown, yellow, red, purple, and white. The colors of the stone result from small amounts of iron oxides.

== Formation ==
The craters in the Negev are a rare formation, as a combination of several conditions is required for a crater to form: an asymmetrical anticline, rock layers of varying hardness (hard rock layers such as limestone or dolomite on top, and softer rock layers below), a river that erodes the crater's contents with a low erosion base, and a desert climate (dryness that preserves the crater walls from weathering).

In the first stage, a layer of sandstone was deposited in a terrestrial environment. The flooding of the Tethys Sea led to the deposition of marine sedimentary rocks - limestone and dolomite - on top of the soft sandstones.

Around 90 million years ago, folding forces began to operate in the area. These forces acted for about 40 million years, creating the Negev anticlines (ridges formed from ground folding), including the Hatira anticline. About 30 million years ago, the sea retreated from the Negev region. The retreat of the sea exposed the area to terrestrial weathering processes that eroded the tops of the anticlines. The upper layers made of hard limestone were eroded, and the soft sandstone inside the anticline was exposed. The layer of sandstone eroded quickly and was carried away by Nahal Hatira. The removal of the sandstone layer caused the hard limestone layers to collapse, expanding the crater and creating its vertical walls.

== History ==
The small crater appears on the "Newcombe Map," prepared by the British army in 1914 as part of the preparations for World War I.

The Newcombe Map was unknown to the Jewish settlement, and the crater was discovered by chance during a tour by members of the HaMachanot HaOlim movement in 1942. According to them, the discovery of the "pit," as they called it, surprised even their Bedouin guide.

In December 1958, the Jewish National Fund (JNF) completed the opening of a 13-kilometer road connecting the small crater to the Be'er Sheva-Sedom road. The road was opened for the national oil company searching for oil in the area.

== Industrialization and conservation ==
Near the outlet of the crater in Nahal Hatira, water drilling is carried out, bringing up salty water. The water is pumped up to factories operating in the area, including the "Arad Complex Plants."

The small crater is part of the Negev Craters Nature Reserve and is considered a natural asset of global importance due to its unique geological features and great beauty. Consequently, the Israel Nature and Parks Authority carries out conservation and restoration activities in and around the crater.

== Gallery ==
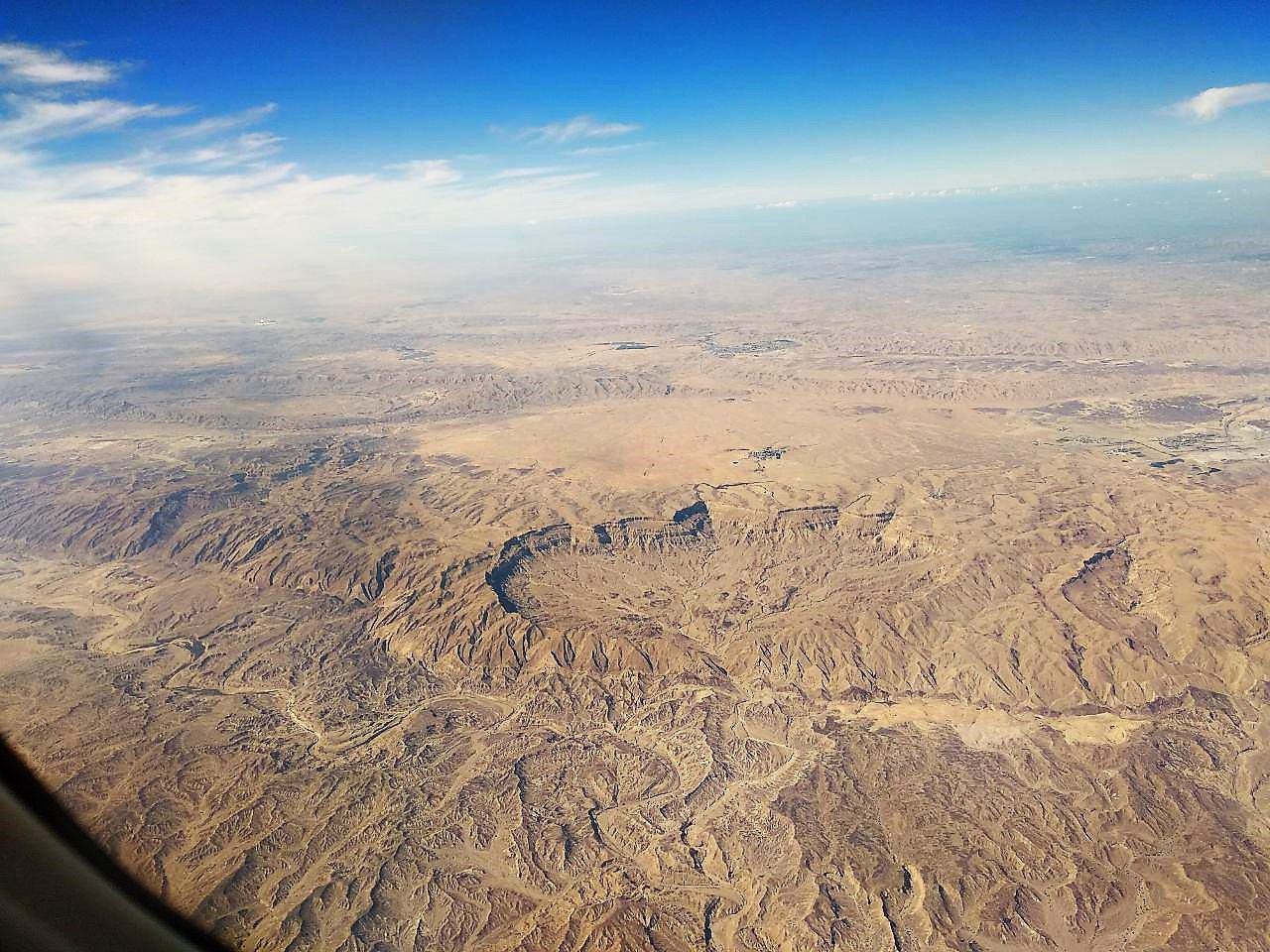
Aerial view

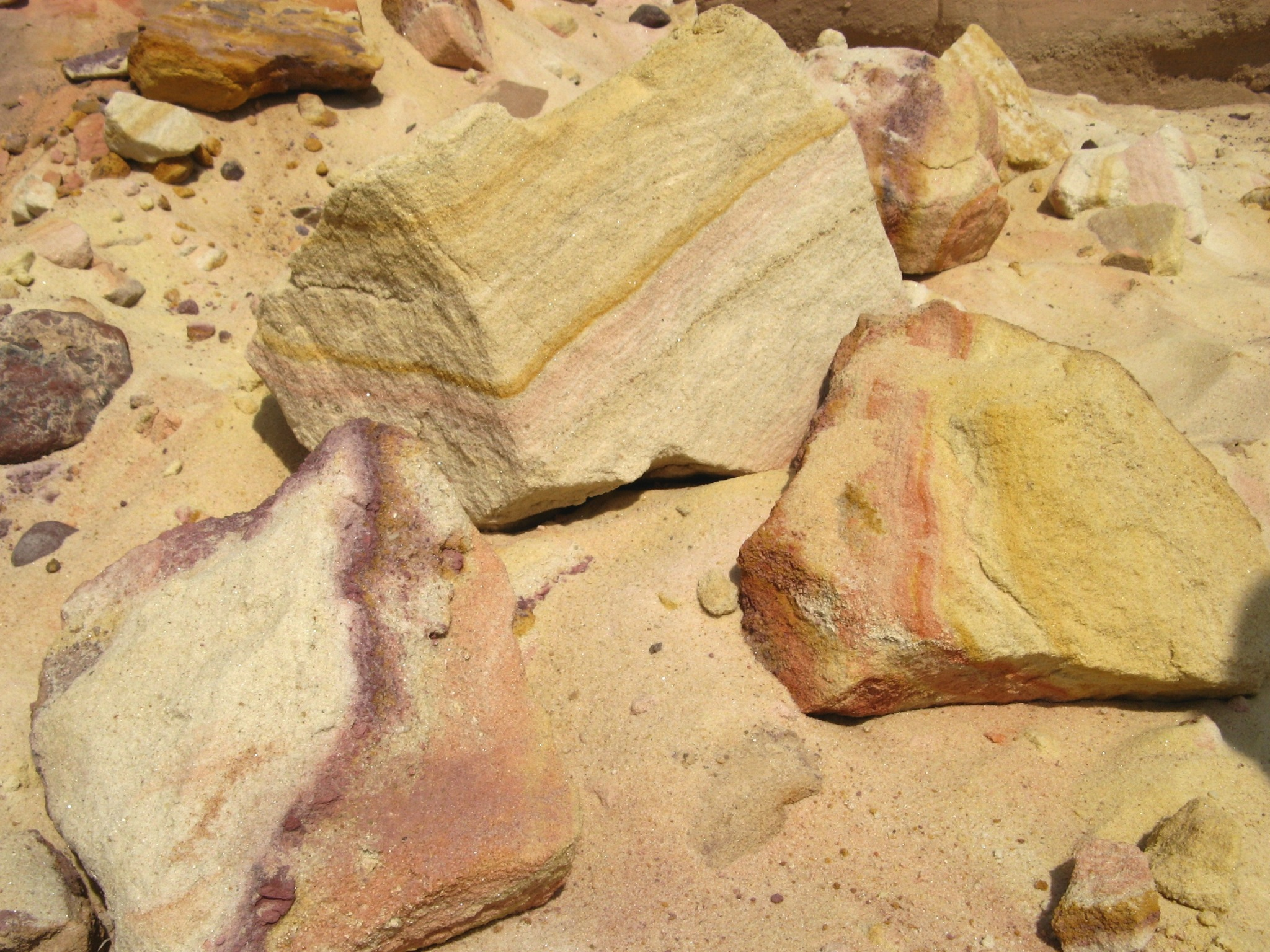
Colored sandstone in a crater

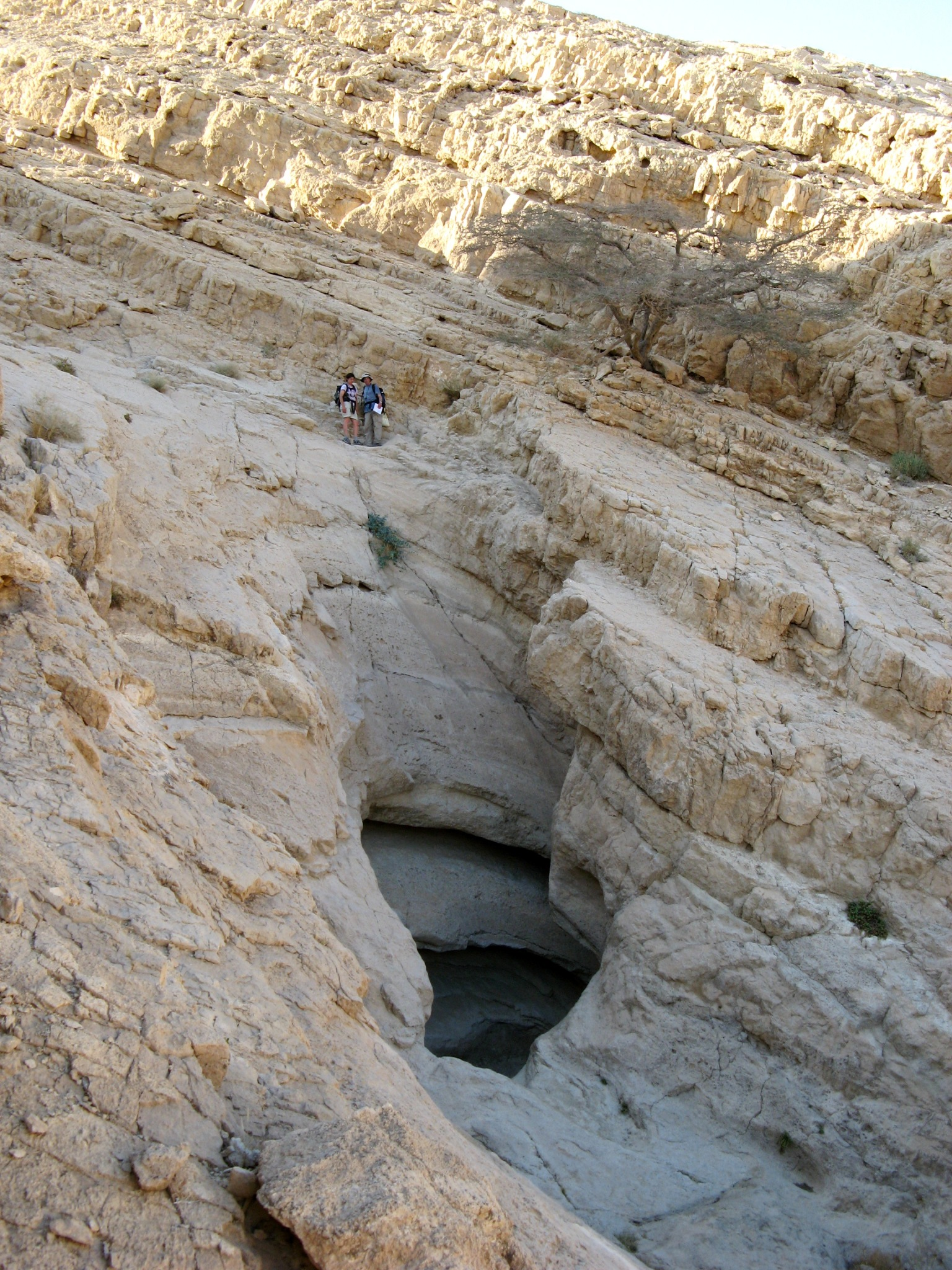
The outer side of the rim of the crater. You can see the sharp angle of the soil layers

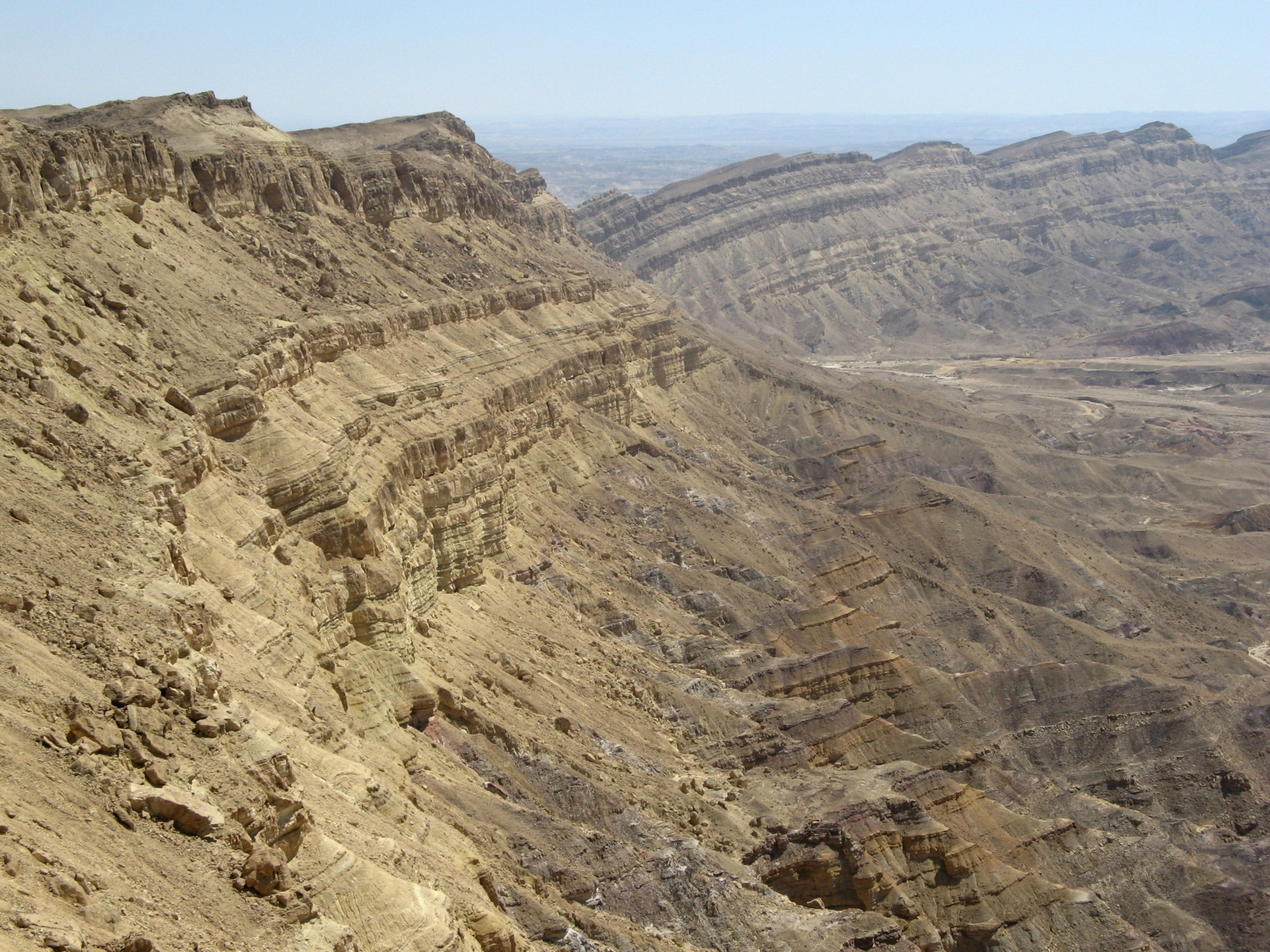
The rim of the crater rising above its bottom

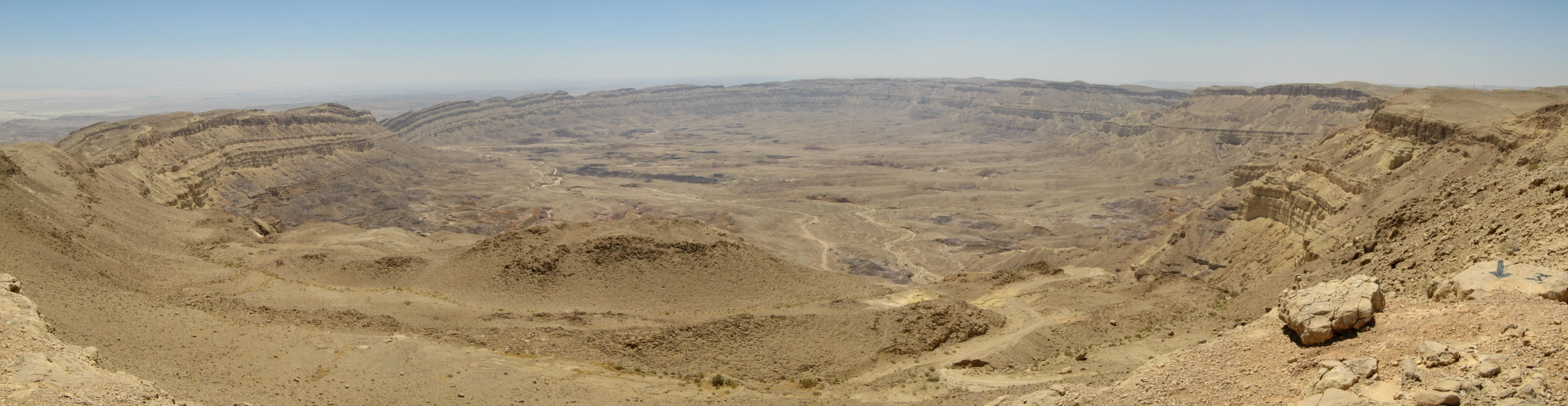
The size of the small crater allows viewing its complete form

== See also ==
- Makhtesh
- Makhtesh Ramon
- HaMakhtesh HaGadol
- Erosion
- Geology of Israel
- Nature reserves in Israel
- Negev Desert
- Geotourism
