= Route 227 (Israel) =

Route in Israel

Route 227
- כביש 227
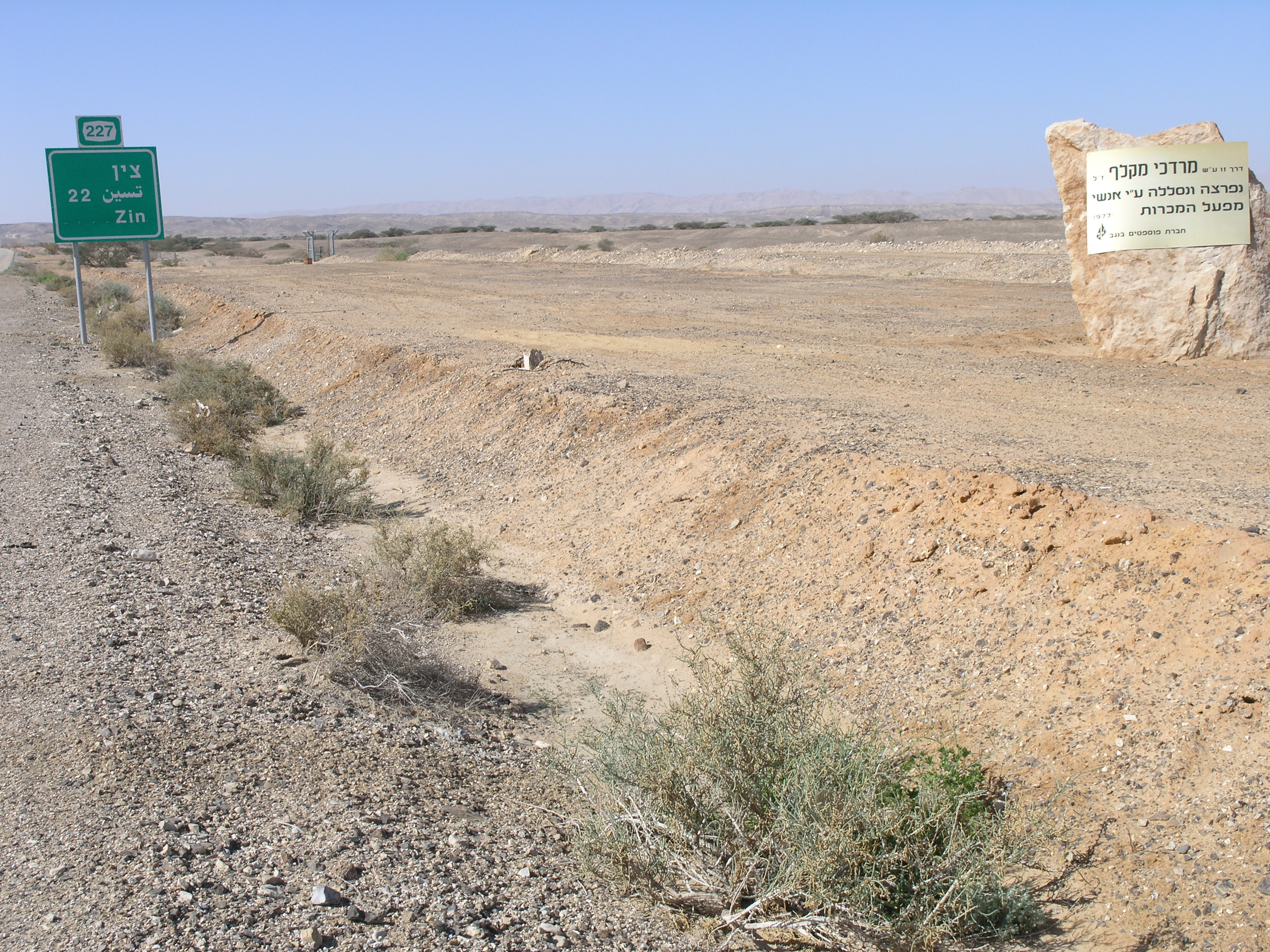

Route information
- Length: 33 km (21 mi)
- Existed: 1950–present

Major junctions
- West end: Nahal Ma'ale Junction
- East end: Ein Hatzeva Junction

Location
- Country: Israel

Highway system
- Roads in Israel; Highways
← Route 225	→ Route 232

Route 227 (Hebrew: כביש 227, Kvish 227) is a 34-kilometre (21 mi) road in the eastern Negev desert of Israel. It starts from an intersection with Route 206 in the northwest and ends in Ir Ovot in the southeast, intersecting with Highway 90. It has one at-grade intersection at 19 km. The original road (since upgraded) was laid by British land surveyors in 1927. Prior to 1956, this was the primary route from Beersheba to Eilat.

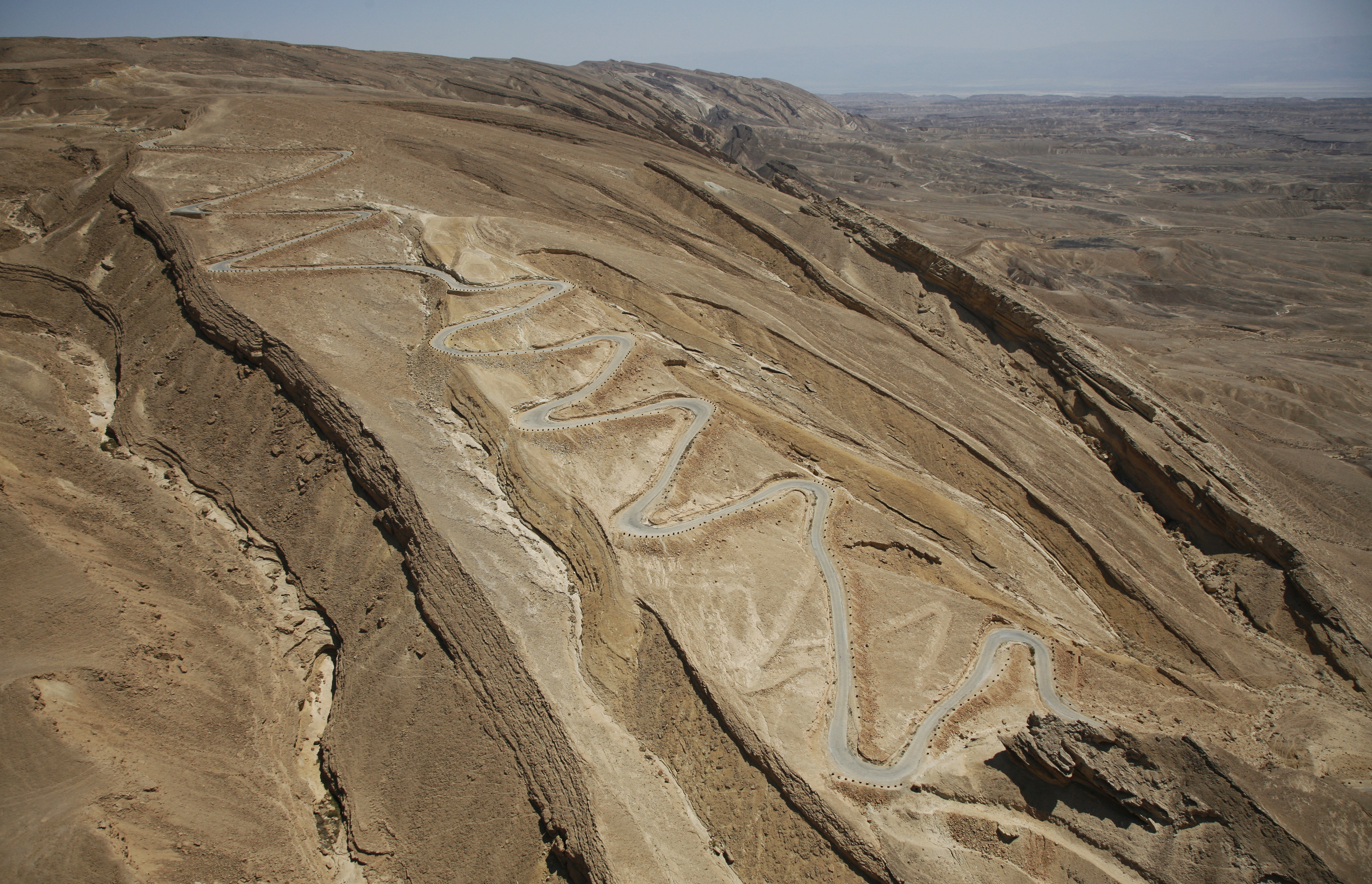
Scorpions' Pass

Scorpions' Pass (Hebrew: מעלה עקרבים, Ma'ale Akrabbim, lit. "Scorpions' Ascent") is a steep, twisted section of Route 227, starting from the Tzafir stone structure (an archaeological site) in the south.

Scorpions' Pass is a recognized heritage site in Israel.

== History ==
=== Antiquity ===
The Roman Empire built the ascent in the late 1st century CE from the Wadi Zin to the highlands of the northern Negev desert during their control of the Middle East. Under British control, the ascent was slightly rebuilt to the north.

During the Nabatean period, the route became a part of the Spice Route.

The Scorpion Path is mentioned in the Books of Numbers, Joshua, and Judges, in the Hebrew Bible, as the southern border of the territory given to the Tribe of Judah and of the Promised Land overall.

=== State of Israel ===
Route 227 passes through a series of nature reserves: Mishor Yamin, HaMakhtesh HaKatan, Makteshim-Ein Yahav and the Judean Desert.

The Ma'ale Akrabim section of the road was declared dangerous and has been closed to traffic since 2017. Below the pass, there is an abyss, and the road has no guard rails. In addition, the road has extreme dropoffs of hundreds of metres.

The Israeli Army Corps of Engineers paved it in 1950. It was again repaved in 2004. The National Roads Company of Israel is de facto responsible for the road.

== Junctions (West to East) ==
District	Location	km	mi	Name	Destinations	Notes
Southern	Mishor Yamin	0	0.0	צומת נחל מעלה (Nahal Ma'ale Junction)	Route 206	
Southern	Mishor Yamin	1.5	0.93	מפגש מסילת ברזל (Level crossing)	Railroad track to the Oron and Tsin factories	
Southern	HaMakhtesh HaKatan	10.5	6.5	ללא שם (Unnamed)	Israel National Trail	
Southern	Scorpion's Pass	19	12	צומת ללא שם (Unnamed Junction)	Access road to Tsin Industries	
Southern	Ir Ovot	32.7	20.3	צומת עיר אובות (Ir Ovot Junction)	Entrance to Ir Ovot	
Southern	Idan	33	21	צומת עידן (Idan Junction)	Highway 90; Road 2273	
1.000 mi = 1.609 km; 1.000 km = 0.621 mi

== See also ==
- Ma'ale Akrabim massacre
