= Highway 34 (Israel) =

Road in Israel

Coordinates: 31°29′36″N 34°35′28″E

Highway 34
- כביש 34
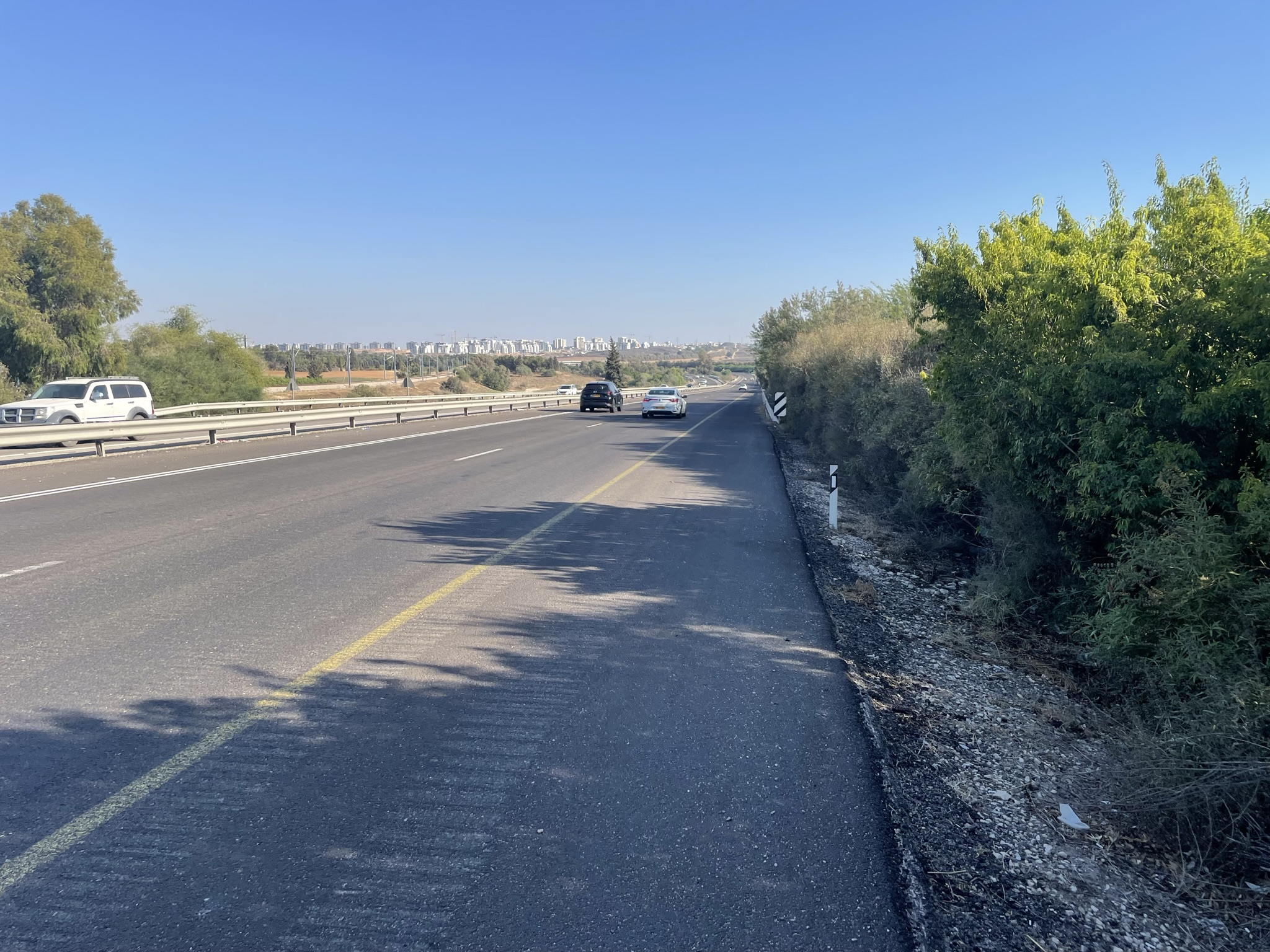
- Highway 34 approaching Sderot from the North

Route information
- Length: 19.75 km (12.27 mi)

Major junctions
- South end: Netivot Junction
- North end: Yad Mordechai Junction

Location
- Country: Israel

Highway system
- Roads in Israel; Highways
← Highway 31	→ Highway 35

Highway 34 is a highway in the South District of Israel that begins at Yad Mordechai in the north, passes through Sderot, and ends in the south at Netivot. Its length is 19.75 km.

== Route ==
Highway 34 begins and ends on two other highways, Highway 4 and Highway 25, linking the two.

Starting in the north, it turns left off Highway 4 to head south-east, whereas Highway 4 continues to the small moshav of Netiv HaAsara, and the Erez Crossing with the Gaza Strip.

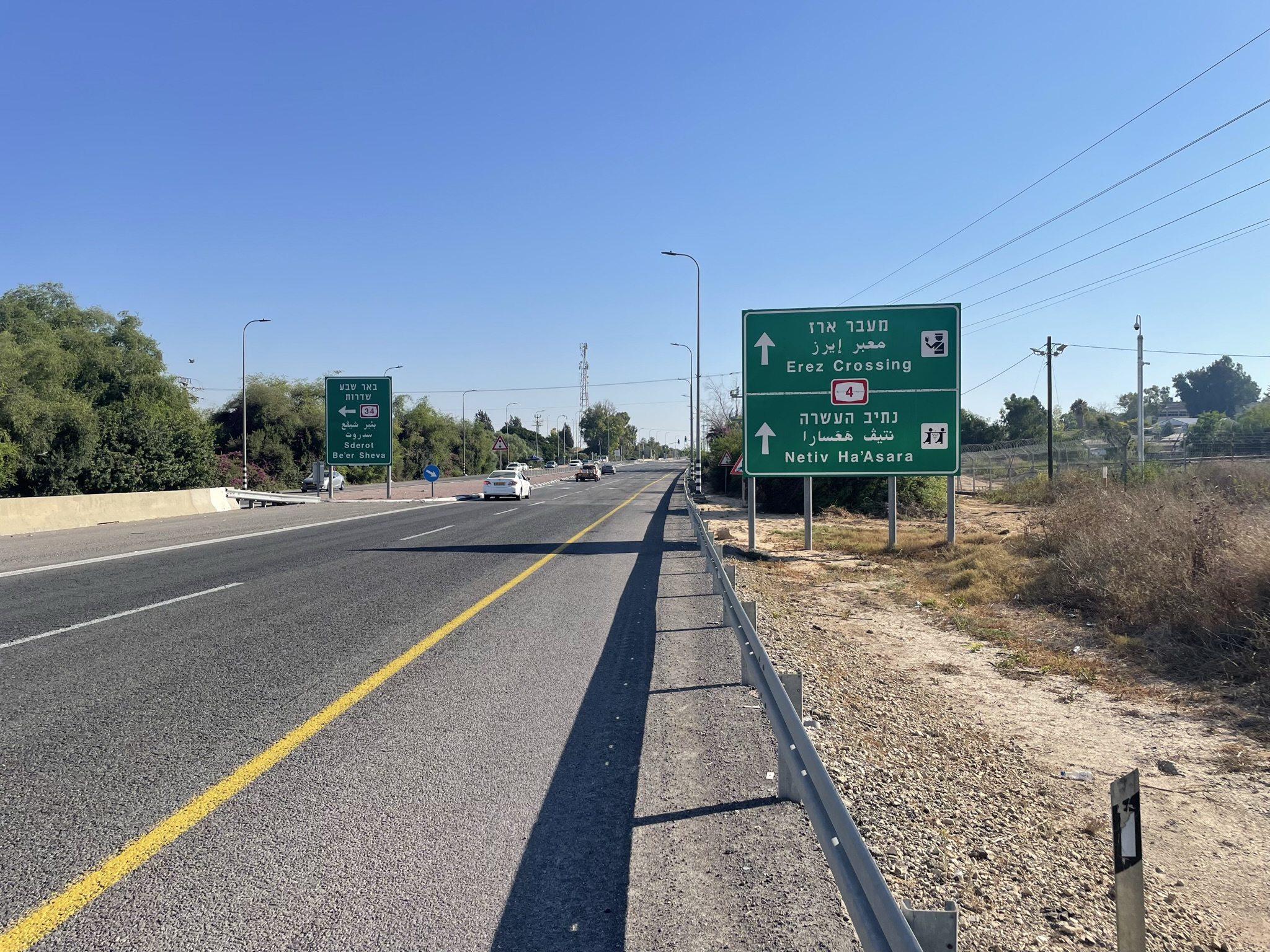
Highway 34 begins

Highway 34 then passes the kibbutzim of Erez and Or HaNer, before heading towards Sderot. There is no entrance to the north of the city, although as of 2024 there was some construction work in progress that will eventually form a link here. As the road passes under the hill of Givat Kobi, the Sderot lookout, it makes its closest approach to the Gaza Strip, 1.11 km (0.69 mi).

It then reaches a junction for kibbutz Nir Am, and shortly afterwards reaches the turning for Menachim Begin Road, which is the main entrance for Sderot and serves the Sderot railway station.

The next junction down is for Route 232 (Israel). Finally, the road mostly heads straight for Netivot, only punctuated by turnings for the moshavim Yakhini and Yoshivya before reaching Highway 25, where the route ends (although Highway 25 is a turn-off-to-stay-on, with the minor branch heading back to 232 and serving Nahal Oz).

== Junctions (South to North) ==
District	Location	km	mi	Name	Destinations	Notes
Southern	Netivot	0	0.0	צומת נתיבות (Netivot Junction)	Highway 25	
Southern	Yoshivya	2.1	1.3	צומת יושביה (Yoshivya Junction)	Road 3341	
Southern	Yakhini	5.7	3.5	צומת יכיני (Yakhini Junction)	Entrance to Yakhini	
Southern	Gevim	8.4	5.2	צומת גבים (Gevim Junction)	Road 3343	
Southern	Sha'ar HaNegev	9.1	5.7	צומת שער הנגב (Sha'ar HaNegev Junction)	Route 232	
Southern	Nir Am; Sderot	10	6.2	צומת נירעם (Nir Am Junction)	Road 3345	
Southern	Erez	14.3	8.9	צומת קיבוץ ארז (Kibbutz Erez Junction)	Road 3521; Road 3523	
Southern	Yad Mordechai	19.75	12.27	צומת יד מרדכי (Yad Mordechai Junction)	Highway 4	
1.000 mi = 1.609 km; 1.000 km = 0.621 mi

== See also ==
- List of highways in Israel
