= Mabu'im =

Community settlement in southern Israel

Mabu'im: מבועים (Hebrew)
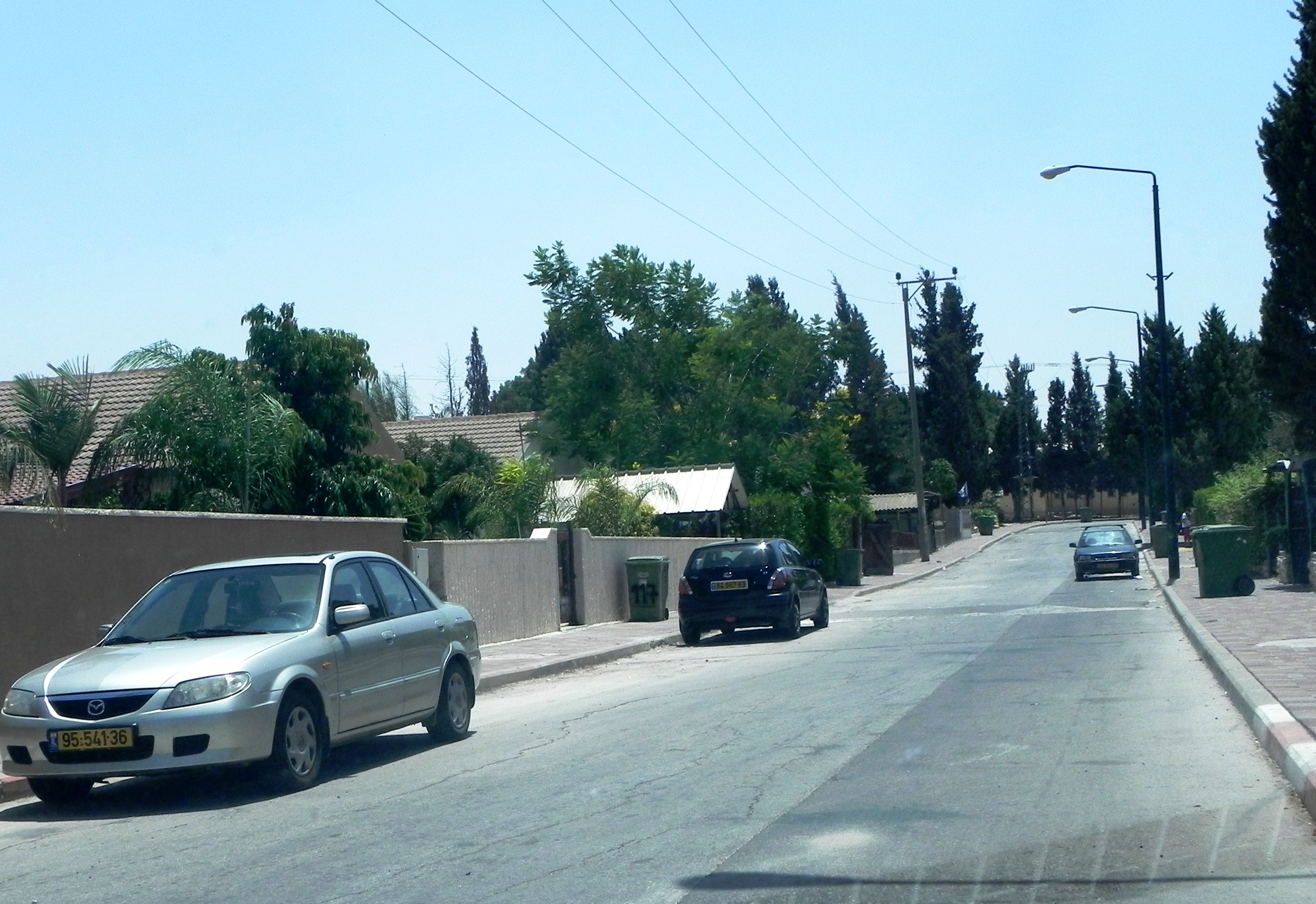
- Etymology: Springs
- Location within Northwest Negev region of Israel Location within Israel
- Coordinates: 31°26′57″N 34°39′13″E
- Country: Israel
- District: Southern
- Subdistrict: Beersheba
- Council: Merhavim
- Founded: 1958
- Founder: Mapamniks
- Population (2024): 1,334

Mabu'im (Hebrew: מבועים, lit. 'Springs') is a community settlement in southern Israel. Located in the north-western Negev desert near Netivot and Rahat, it falls under the jurisdiction of Merhavim Regional Council. In 2024 it had a population of 1,334.

== History ==
The village was established in 1958 as a village centre for the local moshavim. In the 1990s it grew rapidly as it absorbed new residents. Like several other moshavim in the area, its name is derived from the Book of Isaiah 35:7;

And the parched land shall become a pool, and the thirsty ground springs of water; in the habitation of jackals herds shall lie down, it shall be an enclosure for reeds and rushes.
