= Geology of Israel =

The geology of Israel includes igneous and metamorphic crystalline basement rocks from the Precambrian overlain by a lengthy sequence of sedimentary rocks extending up to the Pleistocene and overlain with alluvium, sand dunes and playa deposits.

== Overview ==
Israel is underlain by igneous and metamorphic crystalline basement rocks of the Arabian Craton formed during the Precambrian, although in places these rocks remain poorly studied. Precambrian rocks are only exposed in southern parts of the country, such as amphibolite at Makhtesh Gadol. Other Precambrian units include the Taba Gneiss, Roded and Elat schist, gneiss and migmatite, syenite, Duhayla Granodiorite, Darba Tonalite, Abu Saq'a Schist, Abu Barqa Metasedimens, Saramuj Conglomerate, Sammaniya Microgranite, Yutum Granite, Quani Diorite, Elat Conglomerate, rhyolite, gabbro and other basic rocks.

Mantle-derived basalt magma ascended through rocks in the Timna Valley in southern Israel, providing the heat to form alkali granite, alkali rhyolite dikes and layered serptinized gabbro in the core of Har Timna.

== Paleozoic ==
The Burj Dolomite Shale formation (which includes sandstone, dolomite, and mudstone) and the Umm Ishrin Sandstone formation both date to the Cambrian and appear in the stratigraphic record of central Israel. The region has little evidence of mid-Paleozoic rocks; sandstone, limestone, clay, and gypsum represent most of the sequence from the Permian and Triassic.

Southern Israel has Ordovician age rocks in the Disi Sandstone Formation. Other Paleozoic rock units such as the Yam Suf Group (sandstone, conglomerate, mudstone, dolomite and limestone, Amudei Shelomo and Timna formations), and Shehoret and Netafim formations (all from the Cambrian) appear only in the south.

== Mesozoic ==
Limestone up to 193 meters thick marks the Upper Jurassic in central Israel, followed by the basalt Tayasir volcanic rocks; the 120 meter Kurnub Group (sandstone, limestone and clay); and 670 meters thick Nabi Sa'id, Ein el Esad, Hidra, Rama and Kefira formation (marl, chalk, sandstone and limestone) from the early Cretaceous. Basalt and basanite are both exposed from the Cretaceous in the north.

Limestone, dolomite, chalk and marl formed during Turonian and Santonian times, chalk and chert during the Campanian. The Mishash Formation of the same age contains similar rocks, 86 meters thick, as well as phosphorite. The Hatrurim Formation, or "Mottled Zone," encompasses metamorphosed Maastrichtian through Miocene rocks. In places the Mesozoic was a time of microgabbro and diabase intrusion.

== Cenozoic ==
Chalk, marl and clay of the Mount Scopus Group formed from the Senonian into the Paleocene. During the Paleogene, deposits up to 150 meters thick comprised the Adulam Formation (chert and chalk); 350 meters of limestone of the Timrat, Meroz, and Yizre'el formations; 100 meters of Maresha Formation (chalk); and the similar Avedat Group and Bet Guvrin Formation—all in the Eocene.

The 40 meter thick Lakhish Formation (limestone); 230 meter thick Hordos and Umm Sabun formations (sandstone, mudstone, siltstone, and conglomerate); and the 50 meter thick Ziqlaq Formation (limestone) deposited in the Miocene. Intermediate basalt erupted during the same time period. Pliocene rocks include 30 meters of marl in the Yafo Formation and marl, conglomerate and sandstone 20 meters thick in the Bira, Gesher and Pleshet formations.

Conglomerate and volcanic rocks mark the transition to the Quaternary. During the last 2.5 million years, sandstone, mudstone, oolitic limestone, conglomerate, gypsum, and aragonite varves were deposited as well as travertine, calcareous sandstone, red sandy loam, and alluvium. Recent sands and alluvium dominates most river valleys and coastal areas, while conglomerate, gravel and playa deposits are more common in the south. Basalt and basanite continued to erupt in the north.

== Natural resources ==
Salt is an essential commodity and has been used in the past as an important currency. Mount Sodom was used for salt mining in prehistoric times, and archeological excavations uncovered installations for the loading of salt from the Roman period. In the modern era, salt production plants were built in Atlit, Eilat and along the Dead Sea. The salt is produced by the process of solar evaporation in ponds and seawater desalination.

A high concentration of magnesium with high purity made Israel one of the most important sources of its production. Potassium chloride (potash) is a rich fertilizer for agricultural crops and is produced south of the Dead Sea. During the production process, bromine-rich solutions (used in medicine, industry and cosmetics) remains in the evaporation pools, but its production ceased after it was discovered that this substance emits ozone into the atmosphere.

Phosphate deposits have been discovered since 1950 in several areas in the south of the country, mainly in the craters in the Negev and near Arad. Copper is mined from shafts in the Timna Valley. Manganese ore was also found in the Timna Valley but not in economical quantities. There are a few concentrations of iron ore in Galilee, in the Beit Netofa Valley, at the foot of Mount Tabor, and several sites in the Negev, but these remain unexploited.
