= Makhtesh =

Landform of the Negev desert and Sinai peninsula

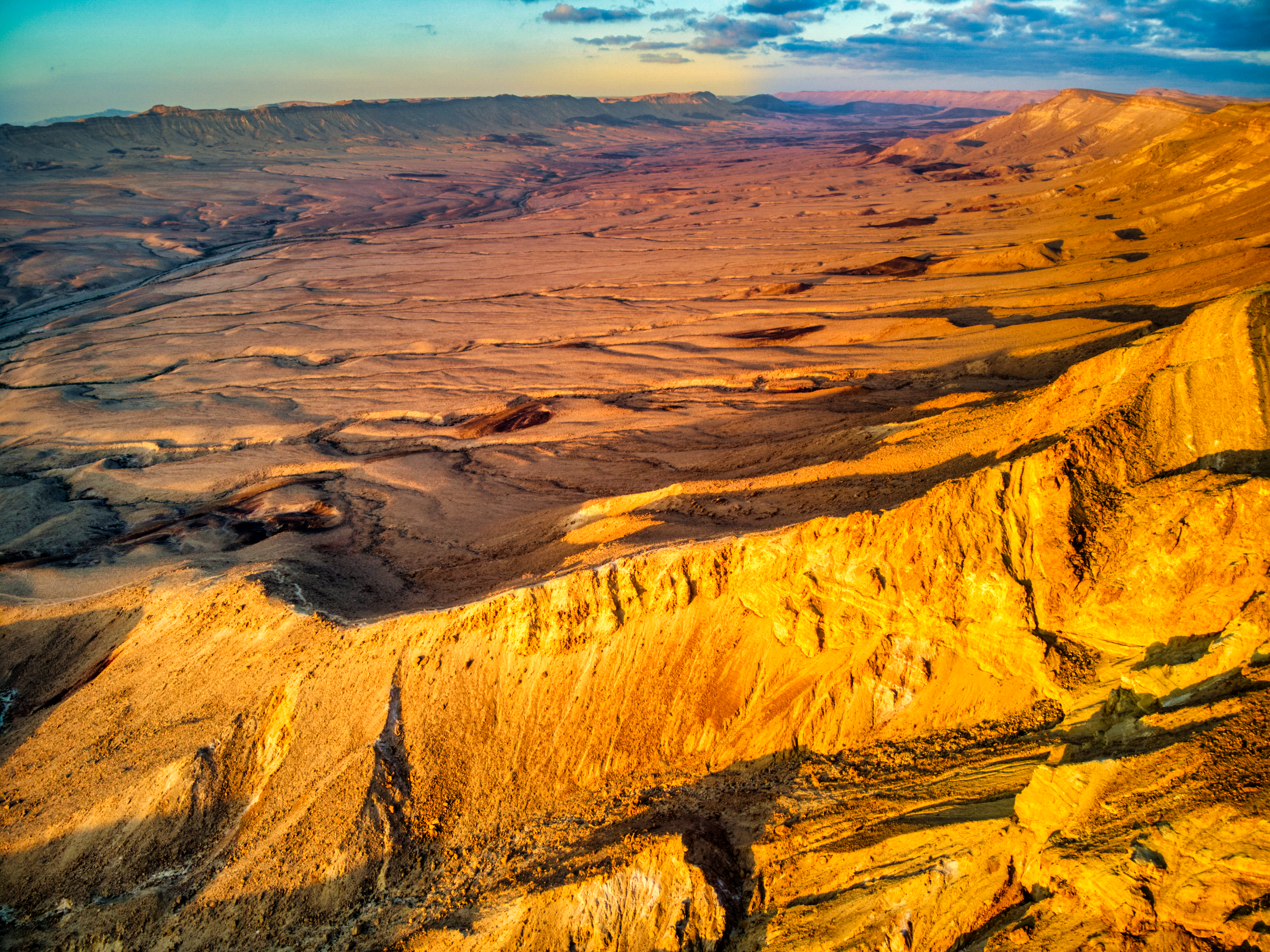
View of Makhtesh Ramon, the largest of Israel's five makhteshes

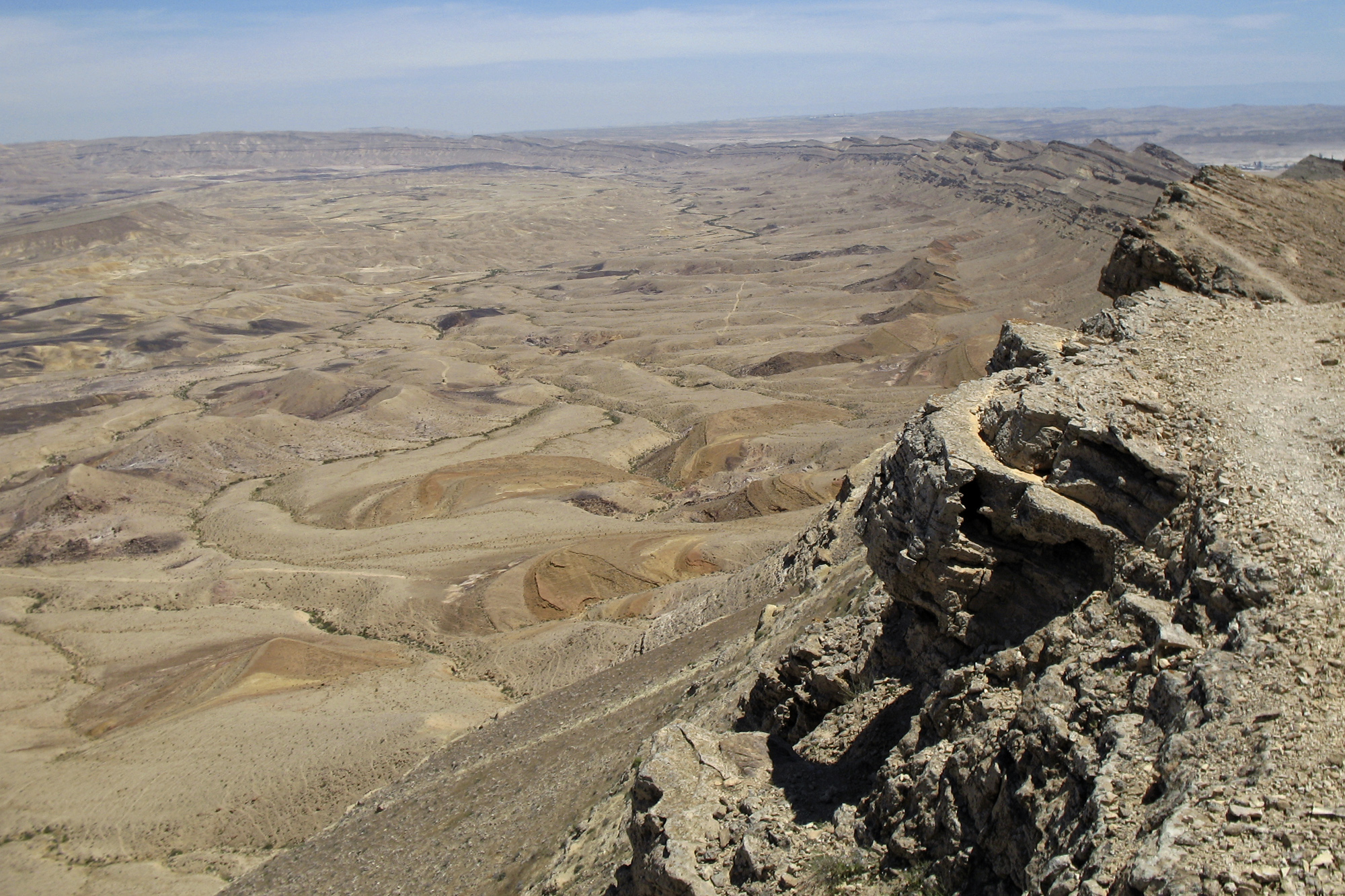
Makhtesh Gadol's southern "Ribs"

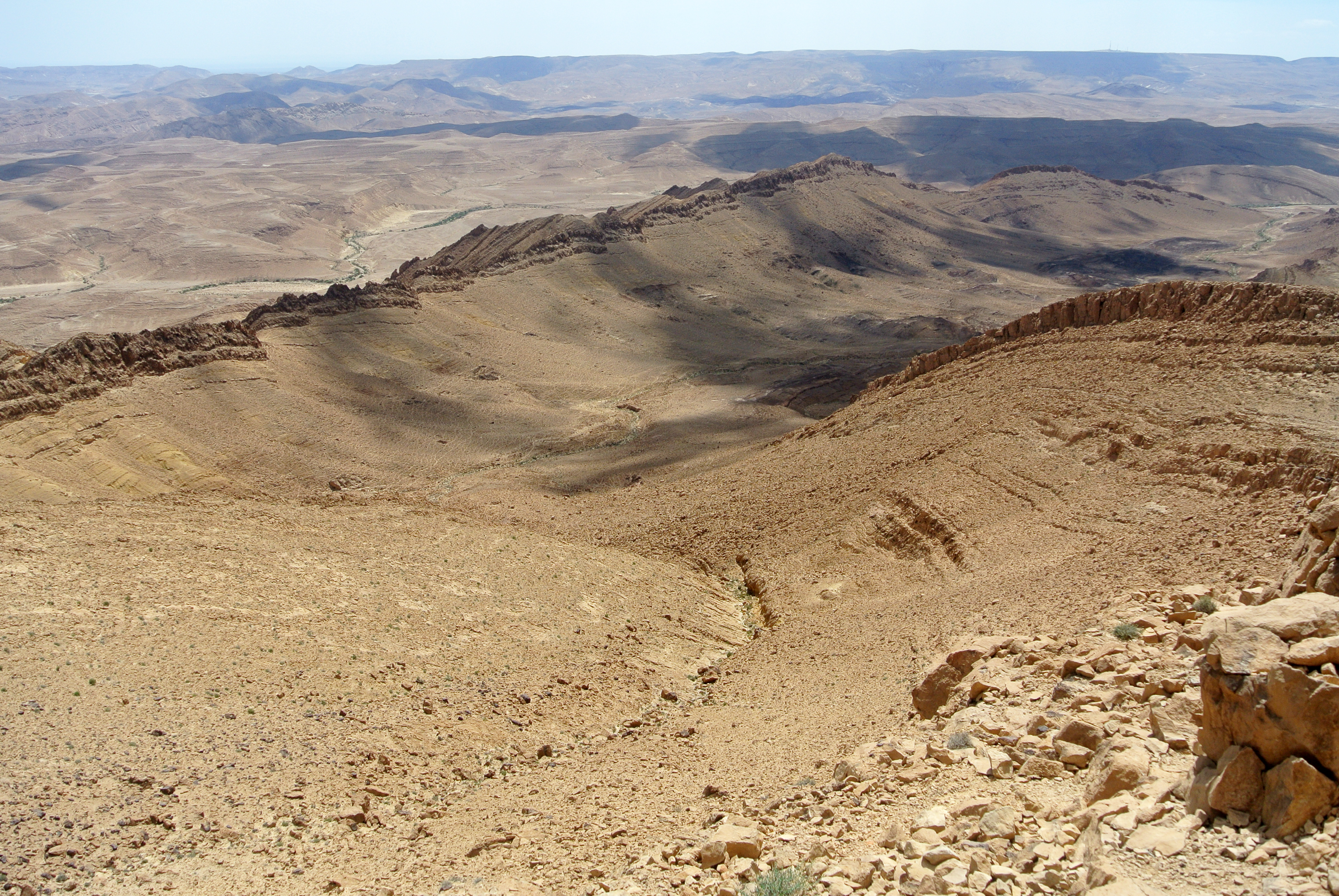
The larger Arif makhtesh

A makhtesh (Hebrew: מַכְתֵּשׁ ([maχˈteʃ]); pl.: makhteshim, Hebrew: מַכְתְּשִׁים [ˌmaχteˈʃim]) is a unique geological landform found primarily in the Negev desert of Israel and the Sinai Peninsula of Egypt. A makhtesh has steep walls of resistant rock surrounding a deep closed valley, which is typically drained by a single wadi. The valleys have limited vegetation and soil, containing a variety of different-colored rocks and diverse fauna and flora. The best known and largest makhtesh is Makhtesh Ramon.

== Etymology ==
Although commonly referred to as "craters", these formations are "erosion cirques" (steephead valleys or box canyons). Craters are formed by the impact of a meteor or volcanic eruption, whereas makhteshim are created by erosion.

The word makhtesh is the Hebrew word for a mortar grinder (מַכְתֵּשׁ). The geological landform was given this name because of its similarity to a grinding bowl.

== Geology ==
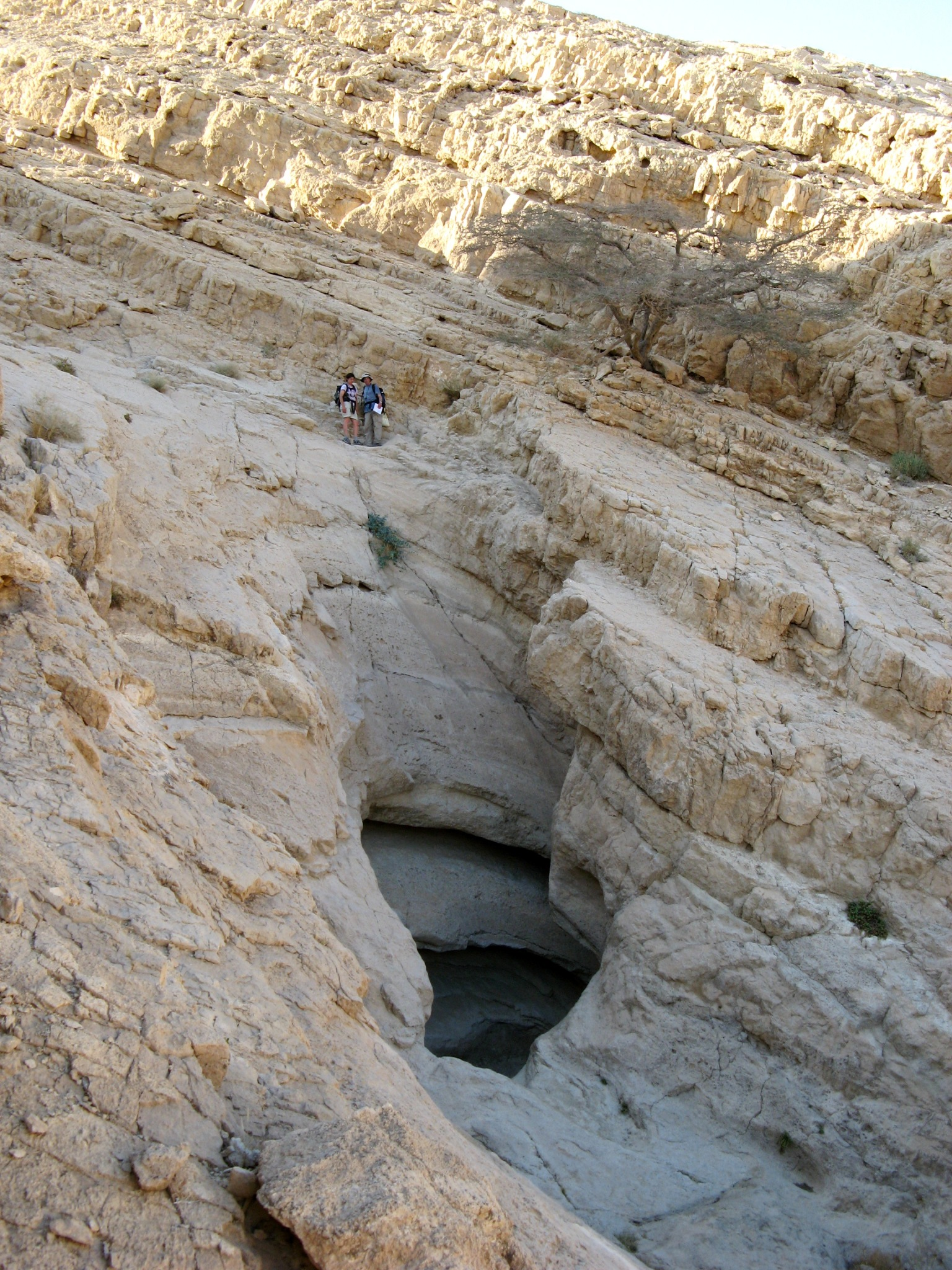
The outer wall of Makhtesh Katan

Where a hard outer layer of rock covers softer rocks, erosion removes the softer minerals relatively quickly, and they are washed away from under the harder rock. The harder rocks eventually collapse under their own weight, and a crater-like valley structure is formed. In Negev and Sinai makhteshes, the hard rocks are limestone and dolomites, while the inner softer rocks are chalk or sandstone.

The center of the Negev is dominated by northeast-southwest anticlinal ridges. The crests of four ridges host five deep valleys surrounded by steep walls. The upper half consists of hard limestone and dolomite, and the bottom is friable sandstone. Each valley, known as a makhtesh, is drained by a narrow river bed.

=== Negev ===
The Negev has five makhteshes: Makhtesh Ramon, Makhtesh Gadol, Makhtesh Katan, and two small makhteshes on Mount Arif, south of Makhtesh Ramon.

- Makhtesh Ramon is exceptional as it is drained by two rivers (Nahal Ramon and Nahal Ardon). It is the largest makhtesh at over 40 km long, 2–10 km wide and over 500 m deep. The rocks in this makhtesh contain thousands of ammonite fossils, as well as volcanic and metamorphic rocks.
- Makhtesh Gadol (Large Makhtesh). At the time of naming, Makhtesh Ramon was uncharted, and so this was thought to be the largest makhtesh, at 10 km by 5 km.
- Makhtesh Katan (Small Makhtesh) is the smallest major makhtesh at 7 km by 5 km and was charted in 1942 by Jewish explorers.

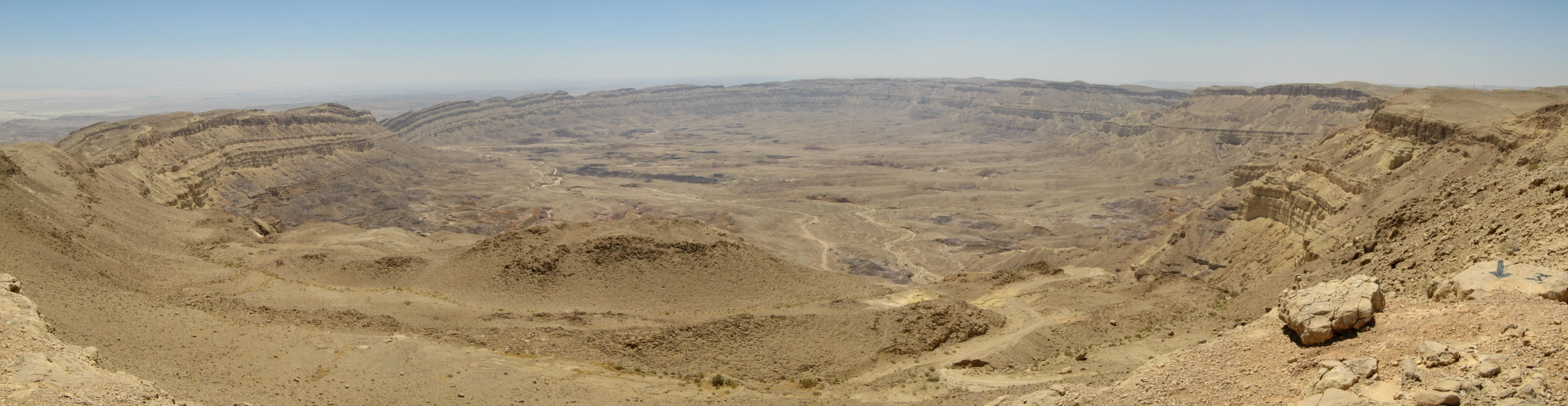
Makhtesh Katan

=== Sinai ===
The two makhteshes in Sinai, Egypt, have no names for the basin, but their walls have several names including Jabal al-Manzur or Gebel Maghara.

=== Jordan ===
Several similar geological formations are also found in Wadi Rum in southern Jordan.

== Gallery ==
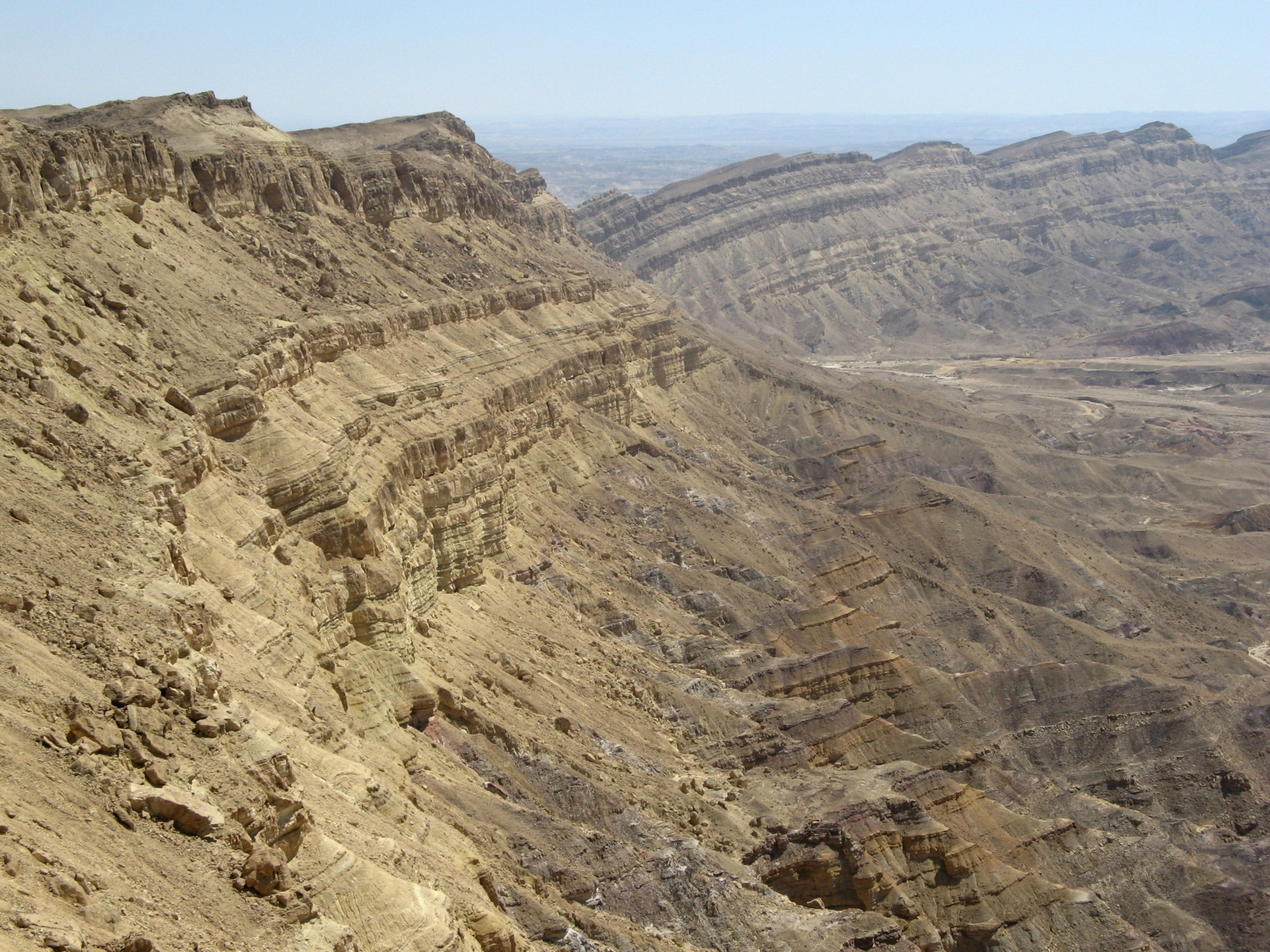
The walls of Makhtesh Katan (the Small Makhtesh)

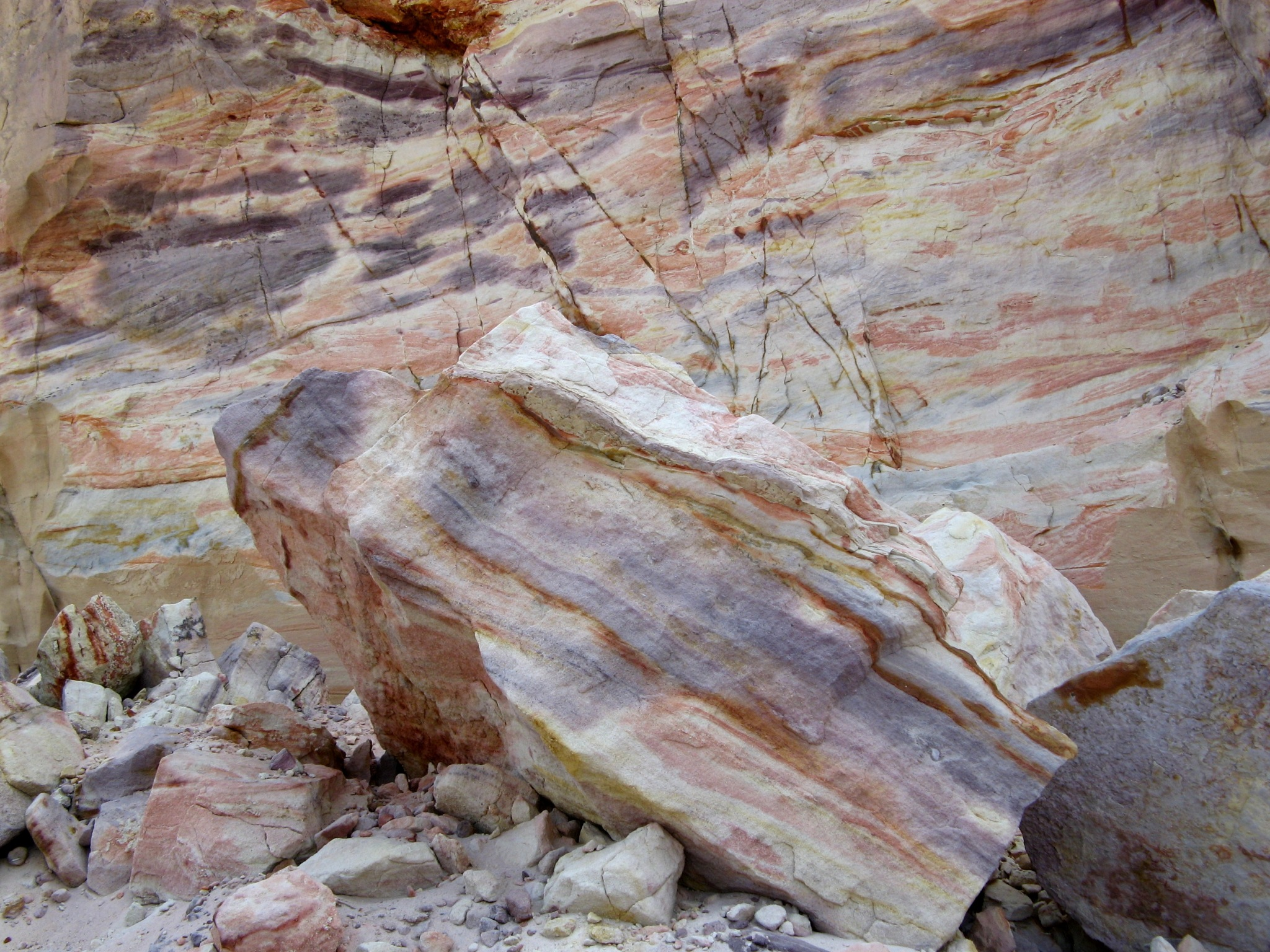
Colorful sandstone in Makhtesh Katan

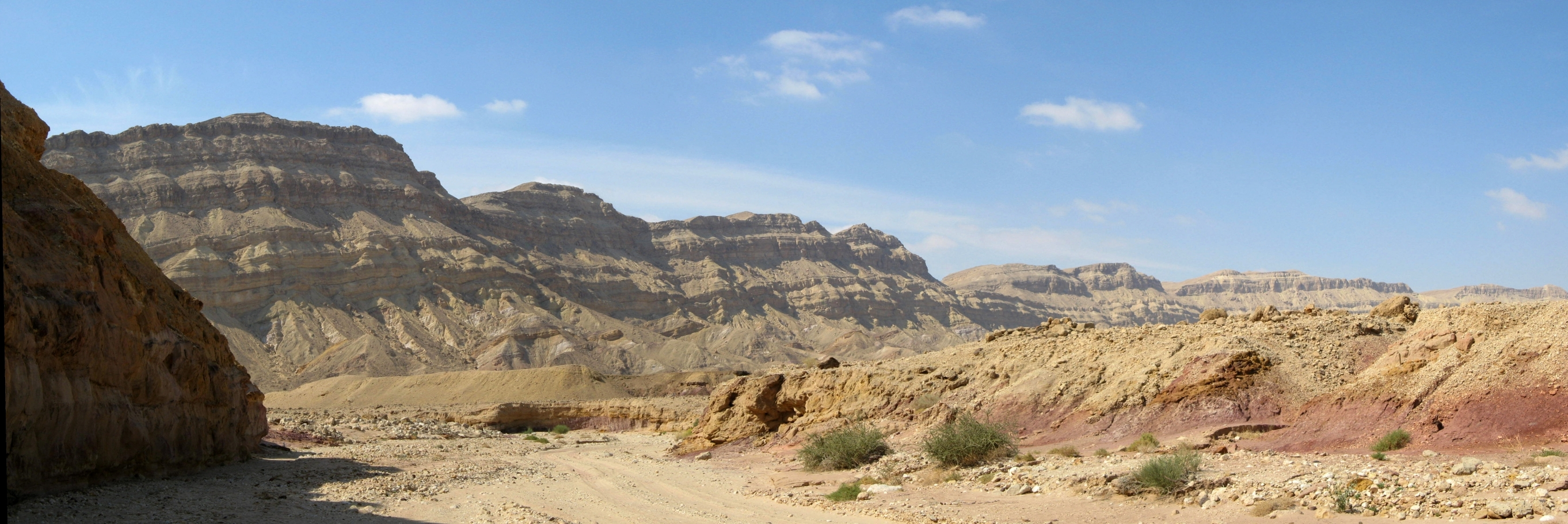
Makhtesh Katan

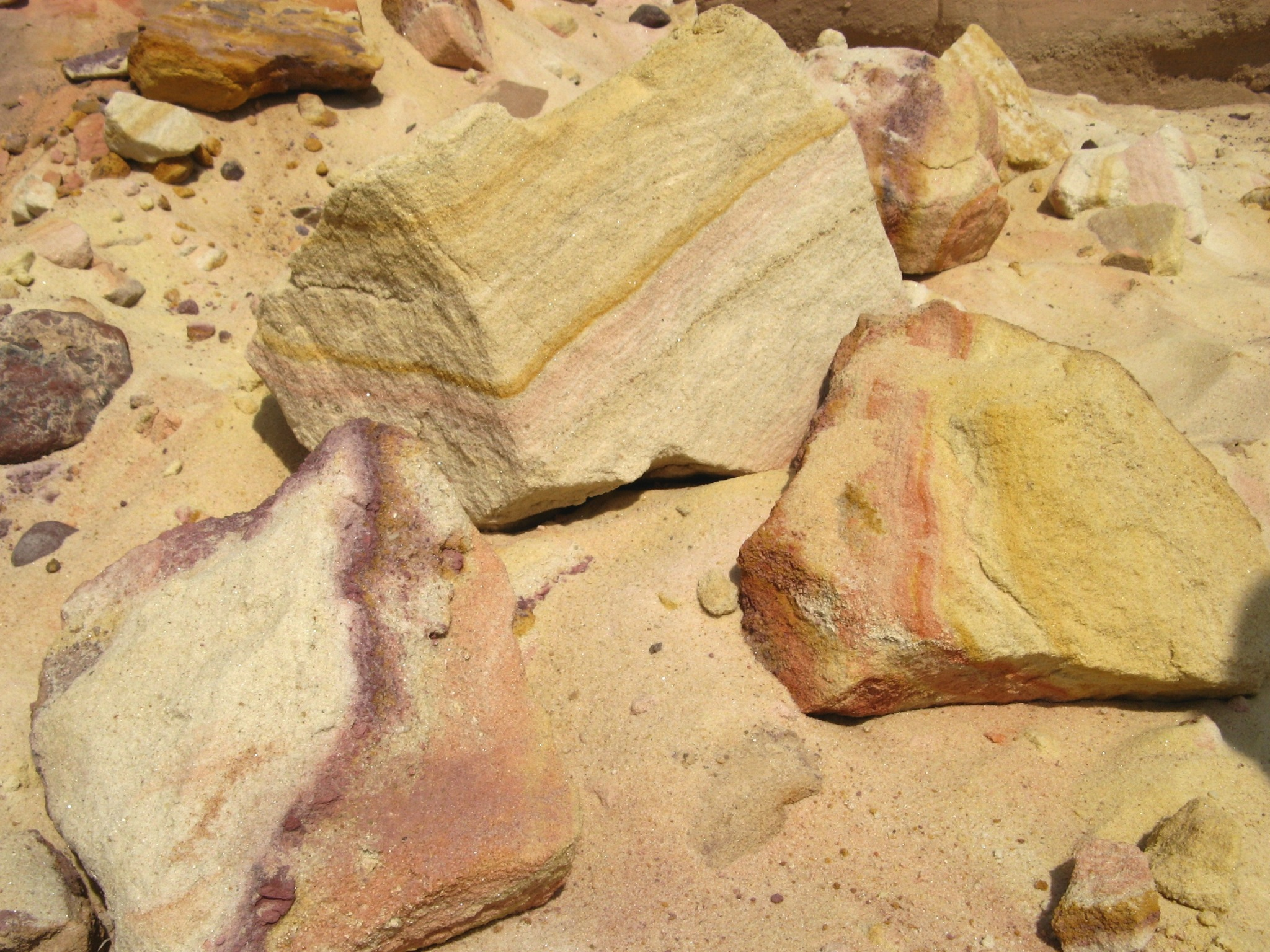
Colorful sandstone in the Small Makhtesh

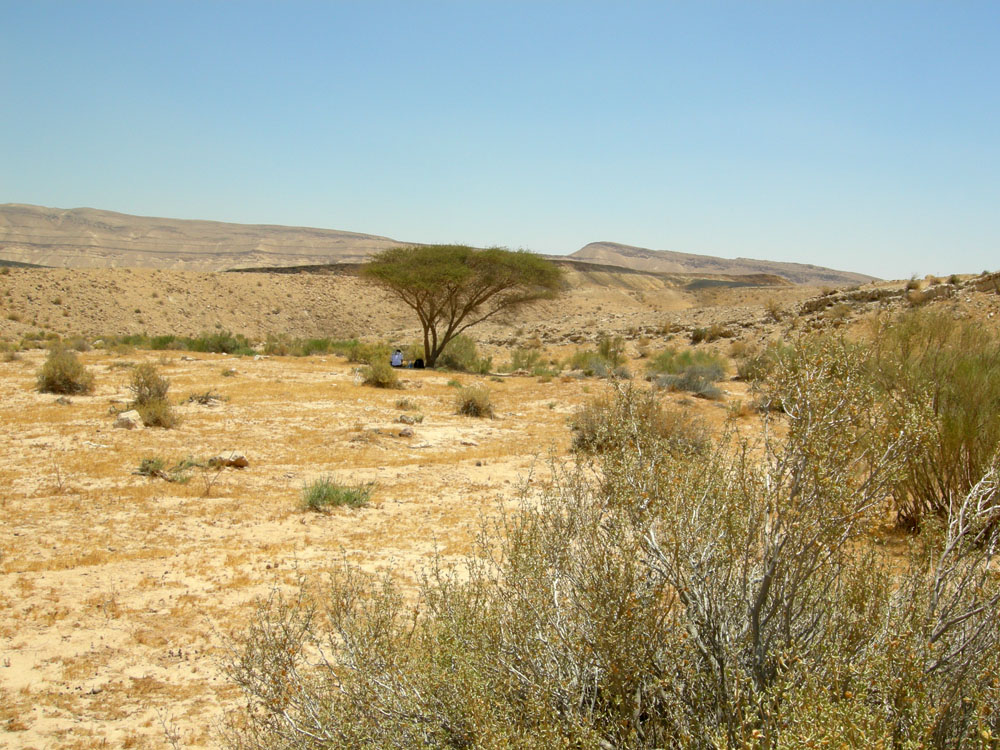
Acacia tree inside Makhtesh Gadol

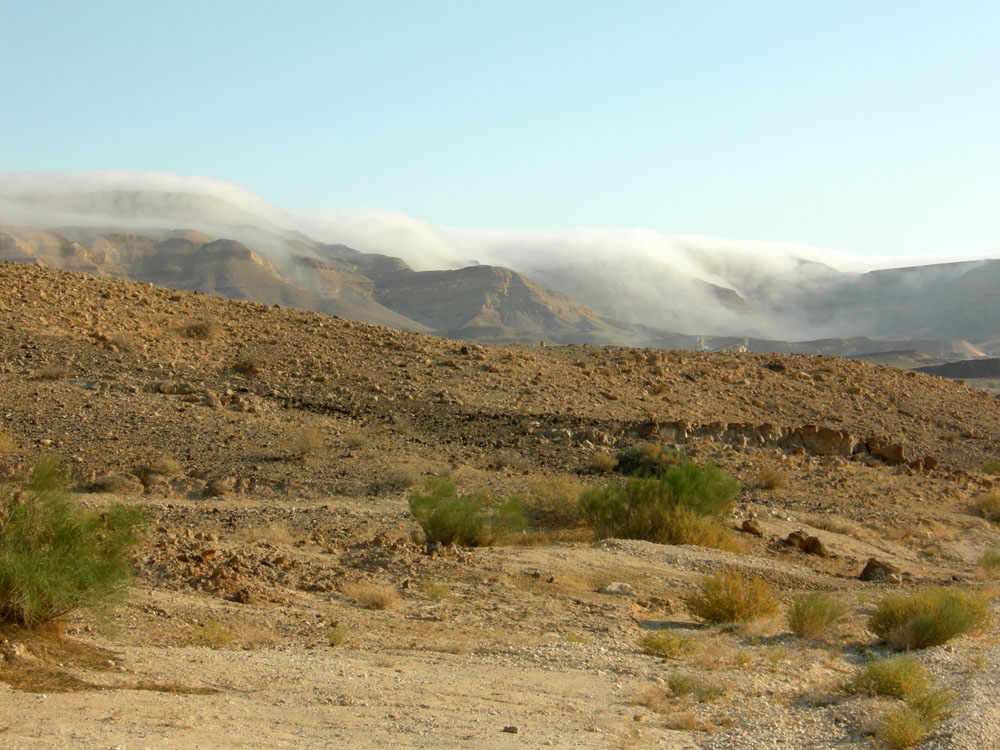
Mist flowing over the northern rim of Makhtesh Gadol

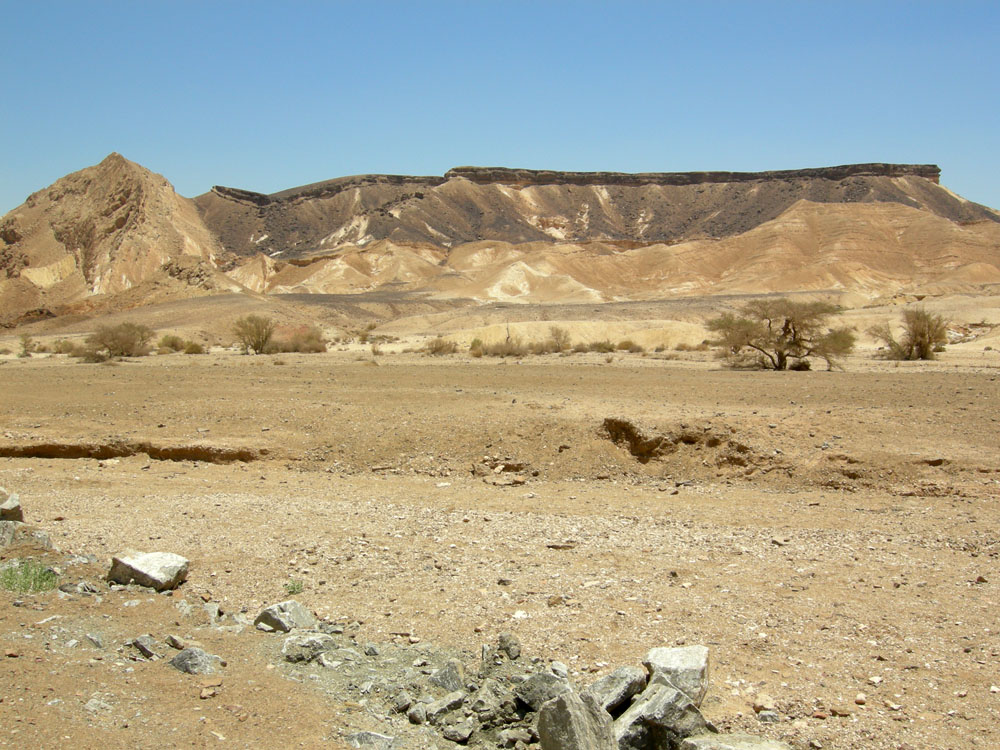
Ramon Monocline on the southern side of Makhtesh Ramon

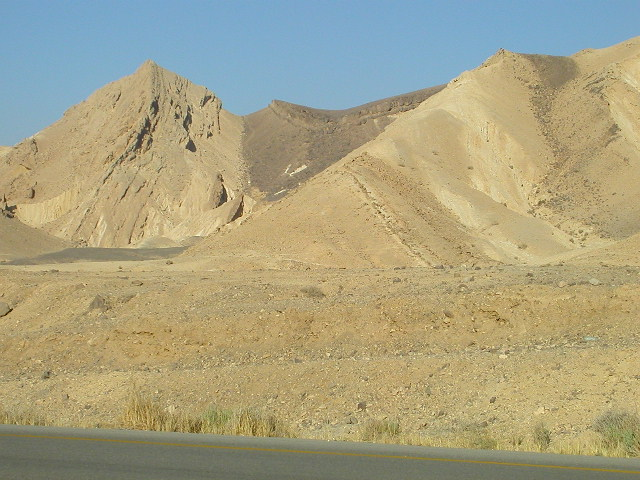
Ramon Fault on the southern side of Makhtesh Ramon
