= Galit Lahav =

Israeli-American systems biologist

- גלית להב
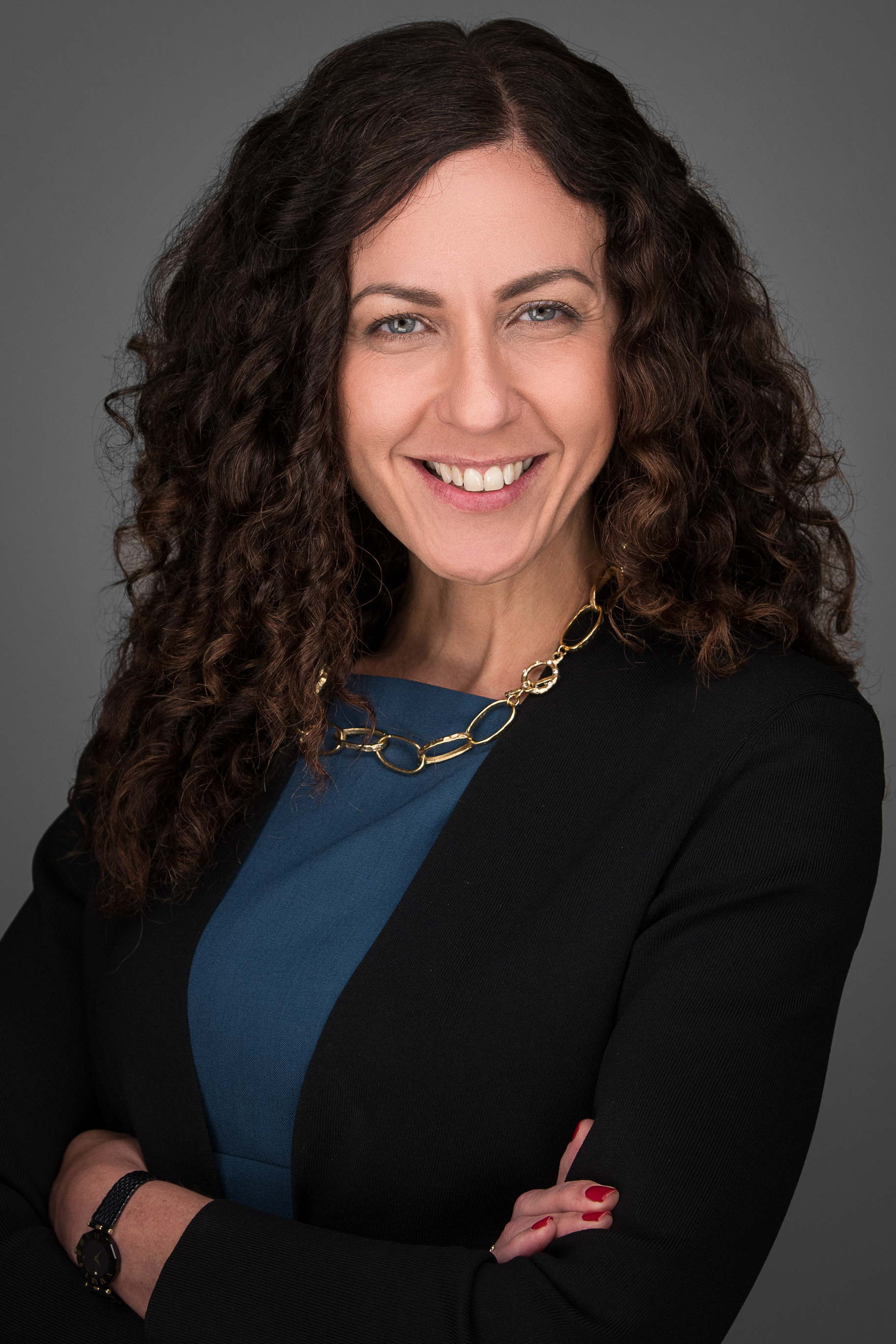
- Galit Lahav in 2018
- Born: Galit Shenhar; 1973 (age 52–53)
- Education: Technion – Israel Institute of Technology
- Known for: Studies of the dynamics of the p53 signaling circuit
- Scientific career
- Thesis: Transcription regulation of IME1, The master regulators of Meiosis in budding yeast (2001)
- Doctoral advisor: Yona Kassir
- Other academic advisors: Uri Alon
- Website: http://lahav.med.harvard.edu/

Galit Lahav (Hebrew: גלית להב; born 1973) is an Israeli-American systems biologist and Professor of Systems Biology at Harvard Medical School. In 2018 she became Chair of the Department of Systems Biology at Harvard Medical School. She is known for discovering the pulsatile behavior of the tumor suppressor protein p53 and uncovering its significance for cell fate, and for her contributions to the culture of mentoring in science. She lives in Boston, Massachusetts.

== Education ==
Lahav earned her PhD in 2001 from the Technion, where she studied transcriptional regulation in the laboratory of Yona Kassir. She then performed postdoctoral work in the laboratory of Uri Alon at the Weizmann Institute of Science.

== Research and career ==
In her postdoctoral work in the Alon lab, Lahav investigated the response of p53 to DNA damage. p53 is highly studied due to its role as "guardian of the genome"; in response to DNA damage, p53 activation may lead to a delay in the cell cycle to allow DNA repair, or may cause the cell to undergo senescence or apoptosis. Previous work had shown that the feedback loop between p53 and its regulator Mdm2 could theoretically cause oscillations in the level of p53. Oscillations were in fact observed in cells exposed to radiation, using a Western blot technique that measures the average p53 level in a population of cells. Lahav developed a novel system for following p53 levels and Mdm2 levels simultaneously in individual living cells and demonstrated that individual cells show discrete pulses of p53 after gamma irradiation. Genetically identical cells showed different numbers of pulses: 0, 1, 2 or more. Although the size of the pulse does not change with increasing levels of DNA damage, the average number of pulses does increase. In later work, Lahav showed that these pulses are not an autonomous oscillation intrinsic to the p53:Mdm2 feedback loop, but are recurrently initiated by upstream signals of continuing DNA damage. This finding suggests that p53 may measure the intensity of some signals in a digital manner (number of pulses), not in an analog manner (higher concentrations of p53).

Lahav then discovered that DNA damage caused by UV-irradiation results in a different p53 behavior, leading to a single pulse that increases in size and duration with increasing damage. This led her to hypothesize that the dynamic behavior of p53 contained information on the nature of the damage to DNA and determined the nature of the response by the damaged cell. She developed a method for forcing a cell damaged by gamma irradiation to adopt the p53 dynamics seen in UV irradiation, based on precisely timed additions of the Mdm2 inhibitor Nutlin-3. Cells damaged using gamma irradiation without drug treatment showed cell cycle arrest and then recovered, while the same cells treated with drug to simulate UV-type p53 dynamics entered senescence and failed to divide. These results led Lahav to investigate whether the schedule of drug administration might affect the response to common types of combination therapy in cancer, in which drugs are given in combination with radiation therapy. She found that if radiation was given shortly after addition of an Mdm2 inhibitor the treatment enhanced the effect of radiation, whereas a longer gap between the two treatments led to resistance. There is growing consensus that dynamics are important for signaling in multiple biological pathways.

Lahav has measured the cell-to-cell variation in p53 response in colon cancer cells responding to damage by the chemotherapeutic drug cisplatin and has argued that this variation may underlie the phenomenon of fractional kill, in which a fraction of cancer cells survive chemotherapeutic treatment and subsequently grow, causing a recurrence of the cancer.

Lahav joined the Department of Systems Biology at Harvard Medical School in 2004. In 2017 she was appointed Deputy Chair, and in 2018 Dean George Q. Daley appointed her as Chair of the Department. In the announcement of her appointment, Daley highlighted "her pioneering role in developing computational and quantitative experimental approaches to studying the fate and behavior of human cells in disease and health at the single-cell level."

=== Contributions to mentoring ===
Lahav is an advocate for improved mentoring in science. As an assistant professor, she initiated a peer-to-peer mentoring group at Harvard Medical School. She has written on the challenges of combining the role of a mother with the demands of a research career. She served as Junior Faculty Liaison for Faculty Development at Harvard Medical School from 2013 to 2018.

== Awards and honors ==
- 2000: Miriam and Aaron Gutwirth Memorial Fellowship
- 2001: David Aftalion Postdoctoral Fellowship
- 2002: Sara Lee Schupf Women and Science Fellowship
- 2005: Smith Family New Investigator Award
- 2009: John and Virginia Kaneb Award
- 2010: Charles E.W. Grinnell Award for Medical Research
- 2011: Finalist, Vilcek Award for Creative Promise in Biomedical Research
- 2013: Mentoring award, Harvard Medical School
- 2013: Teaching award, Harvard University
- 2019: Smith Family Foundation Prize for Outstanding Scientific Contributions
