= HaMakhtesh HaGadol =

Second largest Makhtesh in Israel

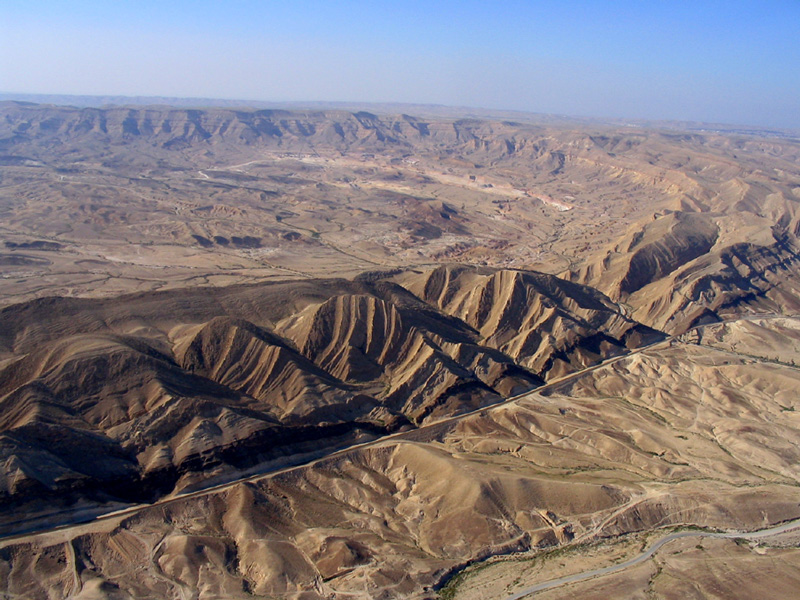
- Eastern part of Makhtesh Gadol from the air

- Location within Israel
- Location: South, Israel
- Coordinates: 30°55′30″N 34°58′52″E
- Length: 12 km (7.5 mi)
- Width: 5 km (3.1 mi)
- Area: 60 km^{2} (23 sq mi)
- Operator: Israel Nature and Parks Authority

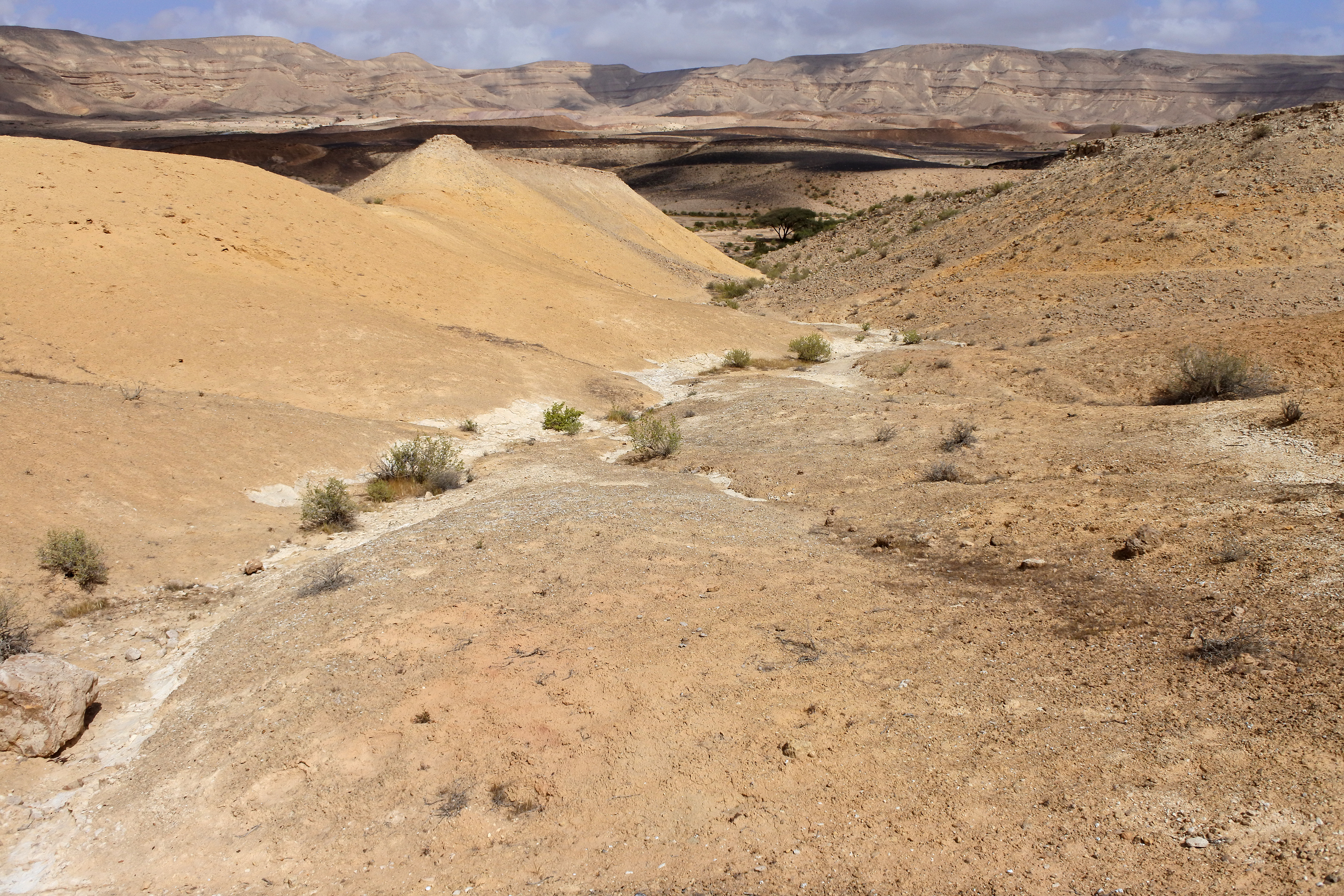
The Matmor Formation near the northern rim of Makhtesh Gadol

HaMakhtesh HaGadol (Hebrew: הַמַּכְתֵּשׁ הַגָּדוֹל, lit. The Big Crater) or simply Makhtesh HaGadol or Makhtesh Gadol, is a makhtesh, a geological erosional landform of Israel's Negev desert. It measures 5 x 10 km.

A makhtesh has steep walls of resistant rock surrounding a deep closed valley. One of five makhteshim in Israel and seven in the world, HaMakhtesh HaGadol is the second largest, and is drained by one river, Nahal Hatira. Makhtesh Gadol was discovered and named before Makhtesh Ramon, which is the largest known makhtesh. This can lead to confusion and Makhtesh Gadol is therefore currently often named as Makhtesh Yeruham or Yeruham Crater.

HaMakhtesh HaGadol is near Yeruham, Israel's first development town, established in the early days of the state. The location was chosen because the region was thought to be rich in natural resources.

== See also ==
- Makhtesh
- Makhtesh Ramon
- Makhtesh Katan
- Erosion
- Geology of Israel
- Nature reserves in Israel
- Negev Desert
- Geotourism
