= Taybeh, Ramallah =

Town in Ramallah, Palestine

Taybeh
- Town

Arabic transcription(s)
  - Arabic: الطيبه
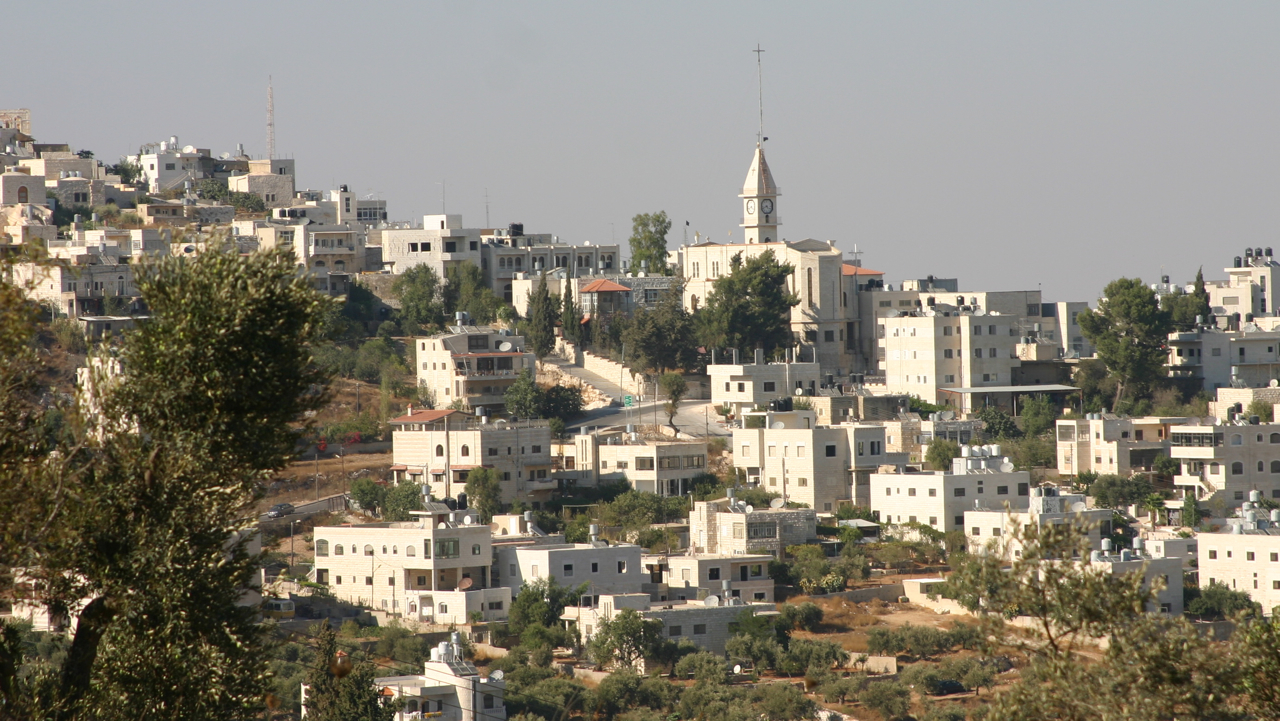

- Location of Taybeh Taybeh (State of Palestine)
- Coordinates: 31°57′16″N 35°18′01″E
- Palestine grid: 178/151
- State: Palestine
- Governorate: Ramallah and al-Bireh
- Elevation: 900 m (3,000 ft)

Population (2017)
  - Total: 1,340
- Name meaning: "The goodly"
- Website: taybeh.weebly.com

Taybeh (Arabic: الطيبة) is a Palestinian village in the West Bank, 15 kilometers (9.3 miles) northeast of Jerusalem and 12 kilometers (7.5 miles) northeast of Ramallah, in the Ramallah and al-Bireh Governorate of Palestine. It is 850 meters (2,790 feet) above sea level. According to the Palestinian Central Bureau of Statistics, Taybeh had a population of 1,340 in 2017.

Taybeh is one of about 12 majority-Christian villages in the West Bank.

== Etymology ==
"Taybeh" means "The goodly". According to a village tradition recorded by W. F. Albright, the place was formerly known as "Afrah". In 1882, SWP suggested that Taybeh might have been ancient Ophrah of Benjamin, and prominent scholars have backed this identification since then.

According to local tradition, Saladin met a delegation of its inhabitants during his wars against the Crusaders. Impressed by the hospitality of the locals, he renamed the village Taybeh, or "goodly" in Arabic. Another version of the story is that he was charmed by their goodness and the beauty of their faces, ordering the village to be renamed Tayyibat al-Isem ("beautiful of name") instead of what sounded like Afra ("full of dust"). Israeli archaeologist Hanan Eshel suggests that during the adoption of the Arabic language in the Palestine region, several locations originally called Ofrah underwent a name change to Taybeh in order to avoid mentioning Ifrit, a demon in Islamic mythology.

== History ==
=== Ancient period ===
Taybeh is identified with ancient Ophrah. The town is mentioned in Josephus' The Jewish War during the time of the First Jewish–Roman War under the Greek appellation Ephraim (Greek: Ἐφραὶμ), or Apharaema (Greek: Αιφραίμ).

The town was cut off from Samaria and incorporated into Judaea in 145 BCE. It served as a toparchy's administrative center before Gophna took its position. Vespasian captured the town during his campaign in Judea in the First Jewish–Roman War, in the early summer of 69 CE, subsequently establishing a garrison there.

According to Conder and Kitchener, Taybeh was an important locality during both Jewish and Crusader times. They noted a rock-cut tomb in the village with multiple kokhim, which seemed to have been originally Jewish but later reused by Christians, as evidenced by the double Latin cross relief cut above the entrance.

=== Byzantine period ===
In the 5th century, a church, known today as St George's Church, was built in the east of the town.

=== Middle Ages ===
Evidence shows the existence of a Christian community at Taybeh as far back as the ninth century.

In the 12th century, another church was built by the Crusaders attached to the first one. The Crusaders fortified Taybeh by means of a castle named in English the Castle of St Elias. In February 1182, Joscelin III gave the castle to king Baldwin IV of Jerusalem along with some other properties in return for the lordship of Mi'ilya.

In 1185, the king Baldwin V of Jerusalem granted the castle to his grandfather William V, Marquess of Montferrat.

However, in 1187 Taybeh fell to Saladin in the wake of the Battle of Hattin. Imad ad-Din al-Isfahani (1125–1201) described it as a Crusader fortress taken by Saladin, while Yaqut al-Hamawi (1179–1229) described it, under the name of 'Afra, as "a fortress in the Filastin Province, near Jerusalem."

=== Ottoman period ===
In 1596, the village was named Tayyibat al-Isem as it appeared in the Ottoman tax registers, located in the Nahiya of Quds of the Liwa of Quds. It had a population of 63 Muslim households and 23 Christian families. The village paid taxes on wheat, barley, vines or fruit trees, and goats or beehives; a total of 22,100 akçe. All of the revenue went to a Waqf.

Around 1810–1820, a large battle was fought in the village between rival factions of the Kais and the Yamani. Eventually the Yamani faction, led by the sheikh of Abu Ghosh, managed to regain Taybeh from the Kais faction. When Edward Robinson visited in 1838, he found it to contain 75 taxable inhabitants, indicating a population of about 300–400 people. It was noted as a Greek Christian village in the District of Beni Salim, east of Jerusalem.

French explorer Victor Guérin visited the village in 1863, and described Thayebeh as having an estimated 800 villagers, 60 Catholics, and the rest Greek Orthodox. He further noted the remains a large building on the top of a hill. An Ottoman village list from circa 1870 showed Taybeh to be a Christian town with 87 houses and a population of 283, though the population count included only men.

In 1882, the Palestine Exploration Fund's Survey of Western Palestine described Taiyibeh as a "large Christian village in a conspicuous position, with well-built stone houses. A central tower stands on the top of the hill; on either side are olive and fig gardens in the low ground. The view is extensive on either side. A ruined church of St George exists near, and there are remains of a ruined castle in the village. The inhabitants are Greek Christians."

Charles de Foucauld (1853–1916), an explorer and French hermit, passed through Taybeh in January 1889 and returned in 1898. Inspired by his visit, he wrote "Eight Days in Aphram, retreat of 1898, from Monday after IV Lent Sunday, (March 14) through Monday, after IV Lent Sunday (21 March)."

In 1896 the population of Et-taijibe was estimated to be about 672 persons.

=== British Mandate ===
In the 1922 census of Palestine conducted by the British Mandate authorities, Al Taibeh had a population of 961: 954 Christians and 7 Muslims, where 663 were Orthodox, 249 Roman Catholic, 60 Greek Catholic (Melkite Catholic) and 2 were Anglican.

In 1927 a Greek Orthodox church was built on a Byzantine church, carefully incorporating architectural elements, like columns, lintels, capitals, two fonts, and a fragmentary mosaic pavement with a Greek inscription.

At the time of the 1931 census, Taybeh had a population of 1,125; 1,038 Christians and 87 Muslims living in 262 houses.

The population had increased in 1945 to 1,330; 1,180 Christians and 150 Muslims, while the total land area was 20,231 dunams, according to an official land and population survey. Of this 5,287 were allocated for plantations and irrigable land, 5,748 for cereals, while 80 dunams were classified as built-up areas.

=== Jordanian period ===
In the wake of the 1948 Arab–Israeli War, and after the 1949 Armistice Agreements, Taybeh came under Jordanian rule. The Jordanian census of 1961 found 1,677 inhabitants in Taybeh, of whom 1,176 were Christian.

=== 1967 and aftermath ===
Since the Six-Day War in 1967, Taybeh has been under Israeli occupation.

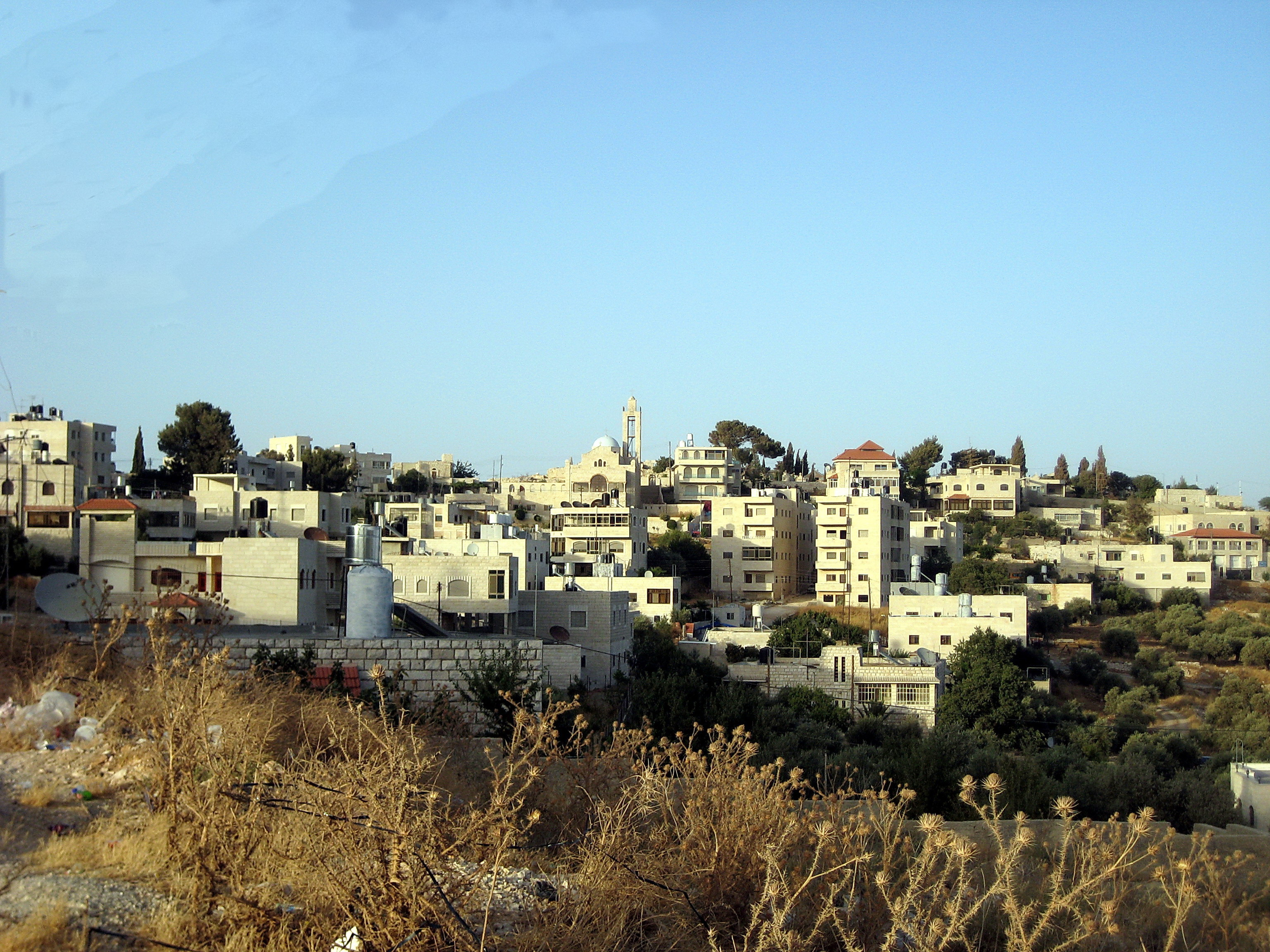
View of Taybeh

In 1986, the Charles de Foucauld Pilgrim Center funded by the French Lieutenancy of the Knights of the Holy Sepulchre opened in the village.

After the 1995 accords, 35% of village land was classified as Area B, the remaining 65% as Area C. According to ARIJ, Israel has confiscated 393 dunam of land from Taybeh for the construction of the Israeli settlements of Rimmonim, and 22 dunams for Ofra.

=== Attacks on the civilian population ===
In September 2005, hundreds of Muslim men from Deir Jarir torched homes in Taybeh in response to an affair between a 30-year-old Muslim woman from Deir Jarir said to have been romantically involved with a Christian man from Taybeh.

Taybeh residents called the authorities to intervene, the Israelis arrived first but they watched and did not intervene. Palestinian policemen arriving from Ramallah were held at an Israeli checkpoint for three hours, and were only allowed to pass after constant calls from the U.S. consulate in Jerusalem. Despite the incident, the neighboring towns continue to have healthy relations; residents say "the people of Taybeh and the people of Deir Jarir are one family".

On 19 April 2013, Israeli settlers attempted to take over Taybeh's monastery and its adjacent chapel.

The Washington Post confirmed that on 25 June 2025, Taybeh and nearby village Kafr Malik were attacked by dozens of armed Israeli settlers, who set fire to homes and vehicles. Three Palestinians were shot dead, although it remains unclear if they were killed by the settlers or the Israeli Defense Force. The Washington Post said it was the latest in a series of "violent raids against Palestinian villages in the West Bank, often with impunity in the presence of Israeli soldiers or directly with their help."

Attacks by settlers continued throughout the summer of 2025, with the local Catholic parish priest, Fr Bashar Fawadleh, complaining of inaction by Israeli authorities. The situation merited a visit by heads of Christian churches in the Holy Land, to show support for the local population and appeal to the Israeli government to intervene.

The Vatican News reported in July 2026 that a group of Jewish settlers set fires in the vicinity of the Byzantine-era Christian cemetery and the Church of al-Khader (St. George), a site dating to the 5th century and regarded as one of the oldest and most venerated Christian places of worship in Palestine. The incidents were part of a series of attacks targeting Christian residents of the town, which had reportedly intensified. Settlers have also been accused of damaging local olive groves—Taibeh’s main source of livelihood—and obstructing farmers’ access to their agricultural land.

Furthermore, the Vatican News also reported that in recent weeks, incidents of settler violence have been reported not only in Taibeh but also in several other Palestinian villages situated near Israeli settlements, including Ein Samia and Kufr Malik, where homes, vehicles, and agricultural fields have been set on fire. At the end of June, four young Palestinians attempting to confront the violence were reportedly killed. In Ein Samia, located in the Jordan Valley, settlers were also reported to have damaged and destroyed the local aqueduct—a spring connected to a Roman-era canal system that continues to supply water to hundreds of thousands of Palestinians, including residents of Ramallah.

On October 2026 diplomats from Belgium, France and Poland who visited Taybeh to assess the situation during olive harvest were attacked by settlers injuring a French mayor and damaging a car from the Belgium consulate.

Hilltop Youth threaten quarry workers in Taybeh May 2026

== Economy ==
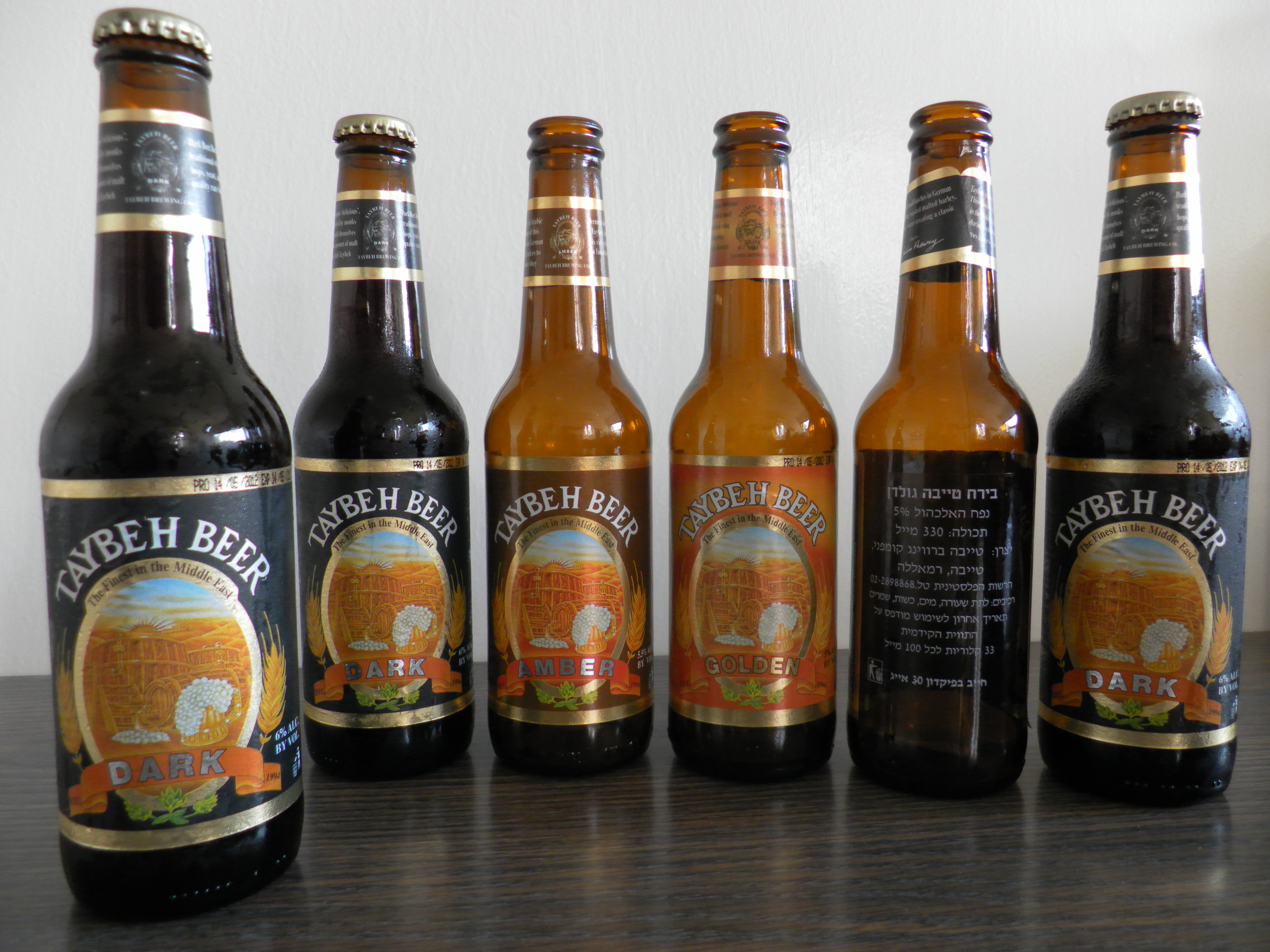
Taybeh beer

Taybeh is the home of Taybeh Brewery, one of the few breweries in Palestine. Since 2005, an Oktoberfest celebration is held in Taybeh, aiming at promoting local Palestinian products and attracting tourism. The celebration offers beer competitions, cultural, traditional and musical performances and other attractions.

From 500 liters of beer in 1995, the company produced 600,000 liters in 2011, mainly sold in the West Bank and Israel. Before the Second Intifada, the beer was sold to upscale bars in Israel. According to David Khoury, the brewery sells 6 million liters a year, and exports its products to Japan and Scotland.

In November 2014, Nadim Khoury, the co-founder of Taybeh Brewing Company has also opened a line of Taybeh wines marketed under the brand name "Nadim" (Arabic for "drinking companion") for a variety of wines, such as Merlot, Cabernet Sauvignon, and Syrah.

== Educational and religious institutions ==
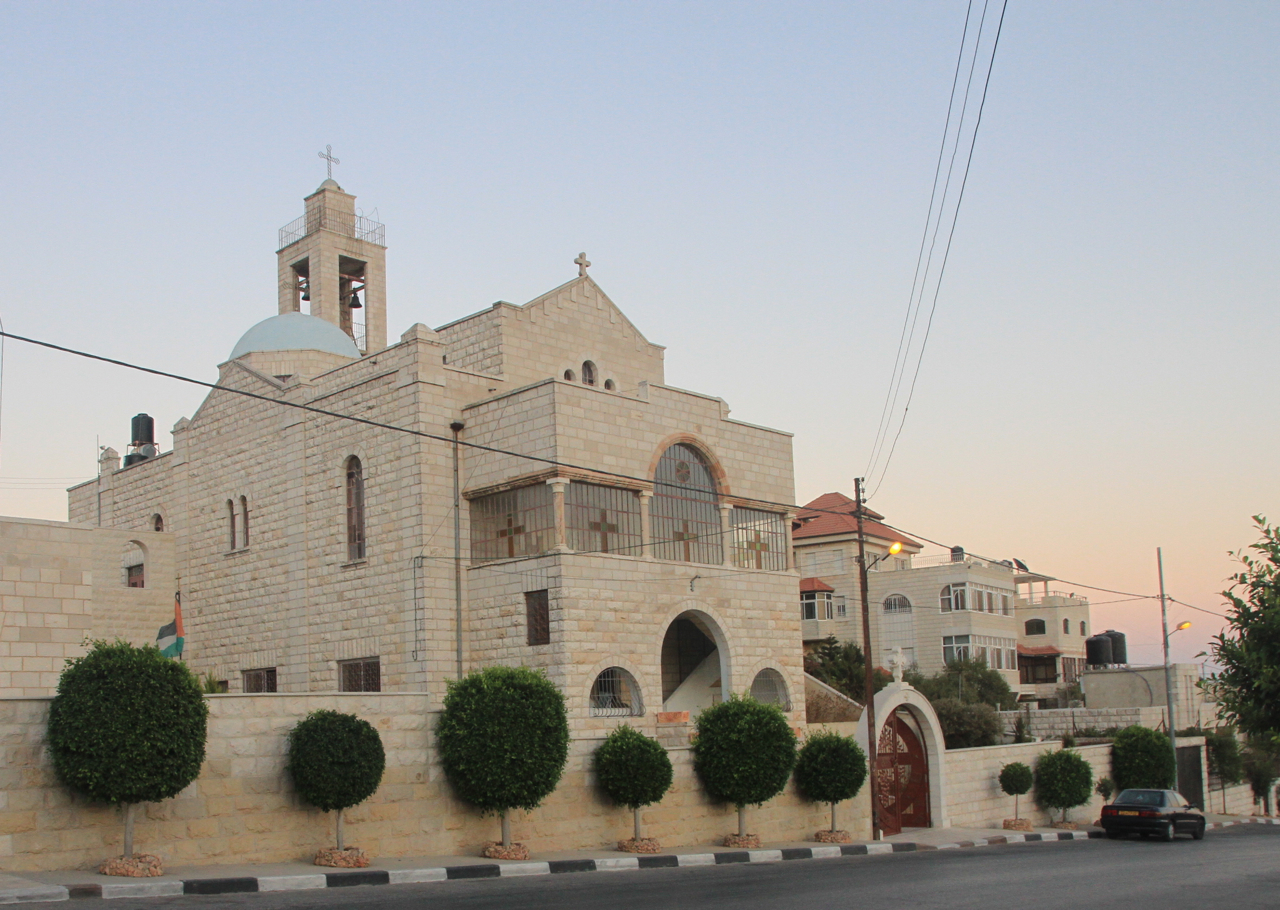
Greek Catholic (Melkite) Church of St. George (August 2010)

The Orthodox Patriarchal School serves over 270 students, and the Roman Catholic (Latin) School serves over 400.

The different Christian denominations worship together on Easter and Christmas. The Latin parish runs a school, a medical center, a hostel for pilgrims and youth programs.

Construction of a new kindergarten and additional classrooms for Al-Taybeh Greek Orthodox School was completed in 2012 with USAID funding of $750,000. The school, built 130 years ago, is the largest in Taybeh. It is attended by 430 students from Taybeh and villages in the vicinity.

== Landmarks ==
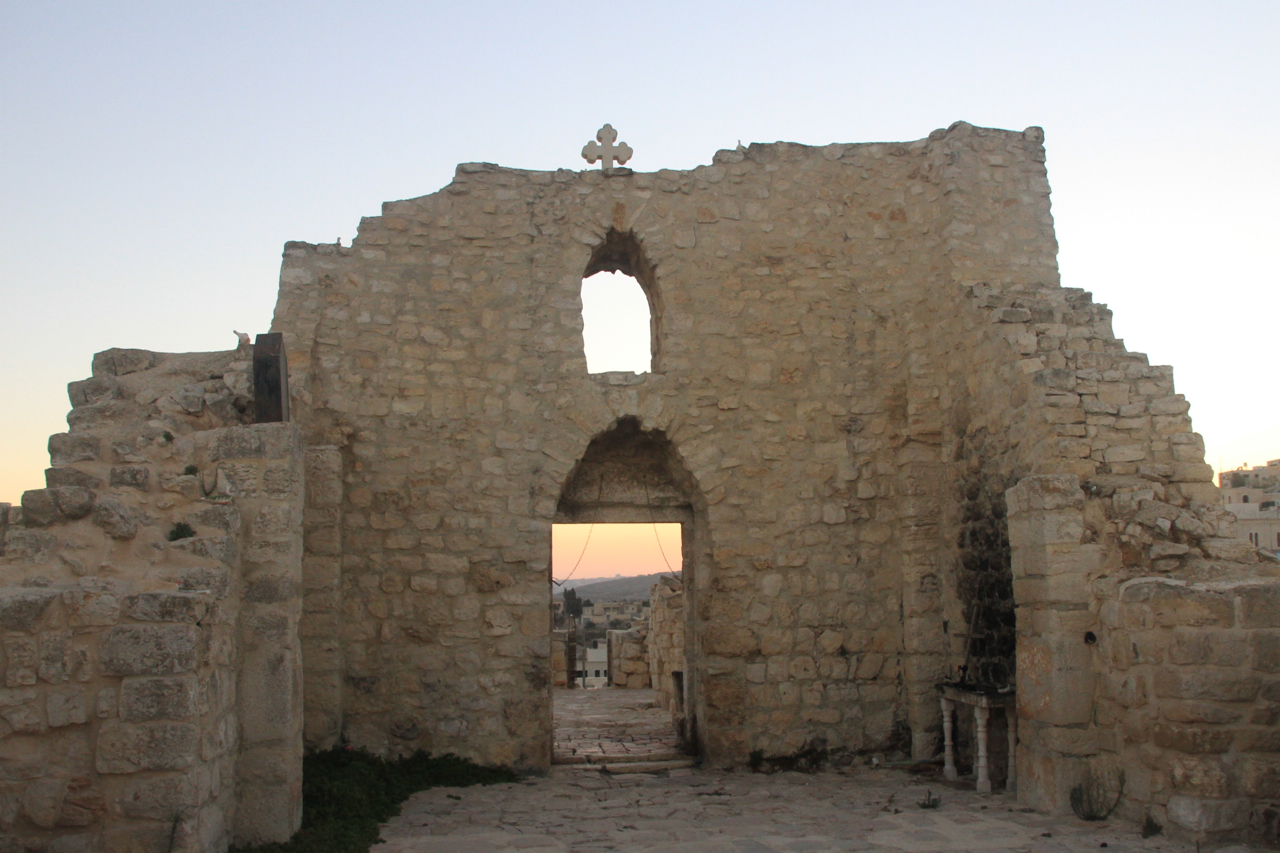
Ruins of the Church of St George

The Al-Khidr Church, or St George's Church, is located east of the centre of Taybeh, and was constructed during two periods, first in the Byzantine era, and then during the Crusader era.

The remains of a Crusader castle, named Castle of St. Elias or Castrum Sancti Helie in Latin, can still be seen.

== Local government ==
The former mayor of Taybeh is David Khoury, co-owner of the local brewery established by his brother.

== Demographics ==
Taybeh is a Christian village, with the Roman Catholic, Eastern Orthodox and Melkite Eastern Catholic faiths represented.

In 2008, Taybeh had a low birthrate and residents feared that the population would entirely disappear. According to the mayor, the population in 2010 was 2,300, with 12,000 former residents and their descendants living in the U.S., Chile, and Guatemala.

== Bibliography ==
- Barron, J.B., ed. (1923). Palestine: Report and General Abstracts of the Census of 1922. Government of Palestine.
- Clermont-Ganneau, C.S. (1896). [ARP] Archaeological Researches in Palestine 1873–1874, translated from the French by J. McFarlane. Vol. 2. London: Palestine Exploration Fund. (p.280, p.293, p.295–p.298 )
- Conder, C.R.; Kitchener, H.H. (1882). The Survey of Western Palestine: Memoirs of the Topography, Orography, Hydrography, and Archaeology. Vol. 2. London: Committee of the Palestine Exploration Fund.
- Dauphin, C. (1998). La Palestine byzantine, Peuplement et Populations. BAR International Series 726 (in French). Vol. III : Catalogue. Oxford: Archeopress. ISBN 0-860549-05-4.
- Ellenblum, R. (2003). Frankish Rural Settlement in the Latin Kingdom of Jerusalem. Cambridge University Press. ISBN 9780521521871. (pp. 120–121)
- Ellenblum, R. (2007). Crusader Castles and Modern Histories. Cambridge University Press. p. 173. ISBN 9781139462556.
- Ernoul, B. le T.; Mas Latrie, L. (1871). Chronique d'Ernoul et de Bernard le Trésorier / publiée, pour la première ... (in French). Mme Ve J. Renouard.
- Finkelstein, I.; Lederman, Zvi, eds. (1997). Highlands of many cultures. Tel Aviv: Institute of Archaeology of Tel Aviv University Publications Section. ISBN 965-440-007-3. (II p. 587)
- Government of Jordan, Department of Statistics (1964). First Census of Population and Housing. Volume I: Final Tables; General Characteristics of the Population (PDF).
- Government of Palestine, Department of Statistics (1945). Village Statistics, April, 1945.
- Guérin, V. (1869). Description Géographique Historique et Archéologique de la Palestine (in French). Vol. 1: Judee, pt. 3. Paris: L'Imprimerie Nationale.
- Guérin, V. (1874). Description Géographique Historique et Archéologique de la Palestine (in French). Vol. 2: Samarie, pt. 1. Paris: L'Imprimerie Nationale.
- Hadawi, S. (1970). Village Statistics of 1945: A Classification of Land and Area ownership in Palestine. Palestine Liberation Organization Research Center.
- Hartmann, M. (1883). "Die Ortschaftenliste des Liwa Jerusalem in dem türkischen Staatskalender für Syrien auf das Jahr 1288 der Flucht (1871)". Zeitschrift des Deutschen Palästina-Vereins. 6: 102–149.
- Hütteroth, W.-D.; Abdulfattah, K. (1977). Historical Geography of Palestine, Transjordan and Southern Syria in the Late 16th Century. Erlanger geographische Arbeiten. Vol. Sonderband 5. Erlangen, Germany: Vorstand der Fränkischen Geographischen Gesellschaft. ISBN 3-920405-41-2.
- Le Strange, G. (1890). Palestine Under the Moslems: A Description of Syria and the Holy Land from A.D. 650 to 1500. Committee of the Palestine Exploration Fund.
- Mills, E., ed. (1932). Census of Palestine 1931. Population of Villages, Towns and Administrative Areas. Jerusalem: Government of Palestine.
- McCown, C. (1921). "Muslim Shrines in Palestine". Annual of the American Schools of Oriental Research. 2–3: 47–79. (p. 66, p. 79: Pl.22)
- Palmer, E.H. (1881). The Survey of Western Palestine: Arabic and English Name Lists Collected During the Survey by Lieutenants Conder and Kitchener, R. E. Transliterated and Explained by E.H. Palmer. Committee of the Palestine Exploration Fund.
- Pringle, D. (1997). Secular buildings in the Crusader Kingdom of Jerusalem: an archaeological Gazetter. Cambridge University Press. ISBN 0521-46010-7.
- Pringle, D. (1998). The Churches of the Crusader Kingdom of Jerusalem: L–Z (excluding Tyre). Vol. 2. Cambridge University Press. ISBN 0-521-39037-0.
- RHC Occ: Recueil des historiens des croisades. Historiens Occidentaux (in French). Vol. 2. Paris: Imprimerie nationale. 1859.
- Robinson, E.; Smith, E. (1841). Biblical Researches in Palestine, Mount Sinai and Arabia Petraea: A Journal of Travels in the year 1838. Vol. 2. Boston: Crocker & Brewster.
- Robinson, E.; Smith, E. (1841). Biblical Researches in Palestine, Mount Sinai and Arabia Petraea: A Journal of Travels in the year 1838. Vol. 3. Boston: Crocker & Brewster.
- Röhricht, R. (1893). (RRH) Regesta regni Hierosolymitani (MXCVII–MCCXCI) (in Latin). Berlin: Libraria Academica Wageriana.
- Schick, C. (1896). "Zur Einwohnerzahl des Bezirks Jerusalem". Zeitschrift des Deutschen Palästina-Vereins. 19: 120–127.
- Socin, A. (1879). "Alphabetisches Verzeichniss von Ortschaften des Paschalik Jerusalem". Zeitschrift des Deutschen Palästina-Vereins. 2: 135–163.
- Strehlke, E., ed. (1869). Tabulae Ordinis Theutonici ex tabularii regii Berolinensis codice potissimum. Berlin: Weidmanns.
