= 'Ain Samiya goblet =

Silver cup from the Middle Bronze Age I

Coordinates: 31°59′3″N 35°19′59″E

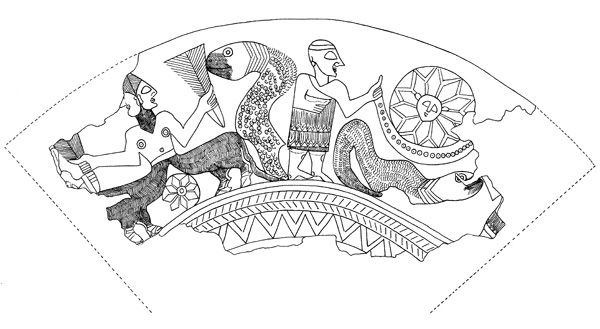
A flat rendering of the scenes depicted on the Ain Samiya Goblet

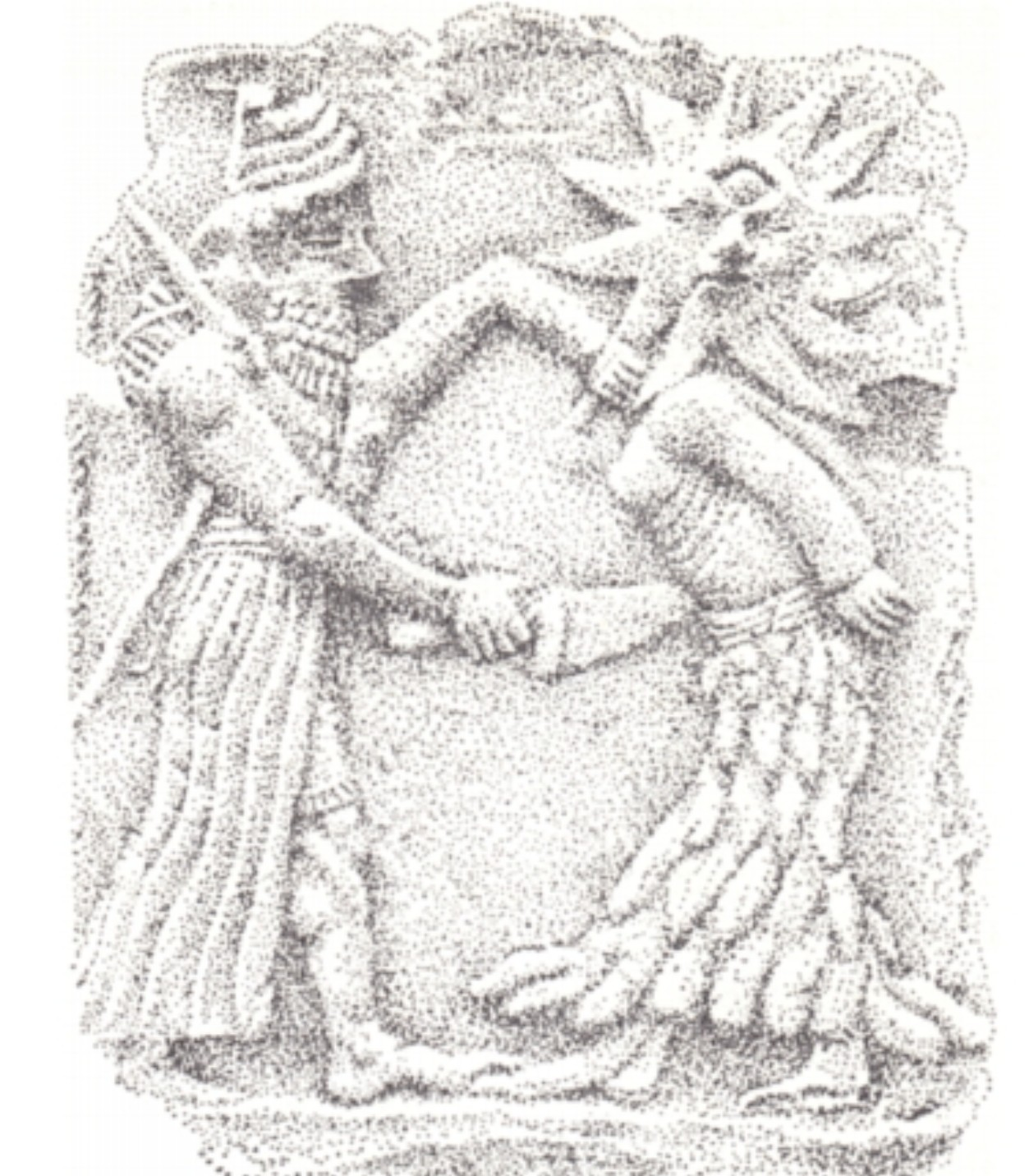
Khafaje plaque with similar iconography found in Mesopotamia from the Isin-Larsa period around the same time as the goblet

The 'Ain Samiya Goblet is a silver cup from the Middle Bronze Age I (2300-2000 BC), found in a tomb at Ain Samiya near modern Ramallah. It was discovered in 1970 at Khirbet el-'Aqibat, located just before Ein Samiya on the road to Kafr Malik. An extensive cemetery had been previously known to cover three adjacent hills: Khirbet el-'Aqibat, Khirbet Samiya and Dhahr el-Mirz, the latter of which had been excavated in the 1960s by Paul W. Lapp, the Director of the American School of Oriental Research in Jerusalem.

It depicts a double-headed god with an animal body planting crops and the dead body of a serpent, parts of whom are being held by two male figures. The scenes are purported to depict a proto version of the Babylonian creation epic, the Enuma Elish and the defeat of Tiamat by the Babylonian patron deity, Marduk. The goblet demonstrates clear influences from Mesopotamia on Proto-Canaanite culture and shares other parallels with contemporary depictions like the Khafaje plaque.

Ain Samiya goblet in Israel Museum

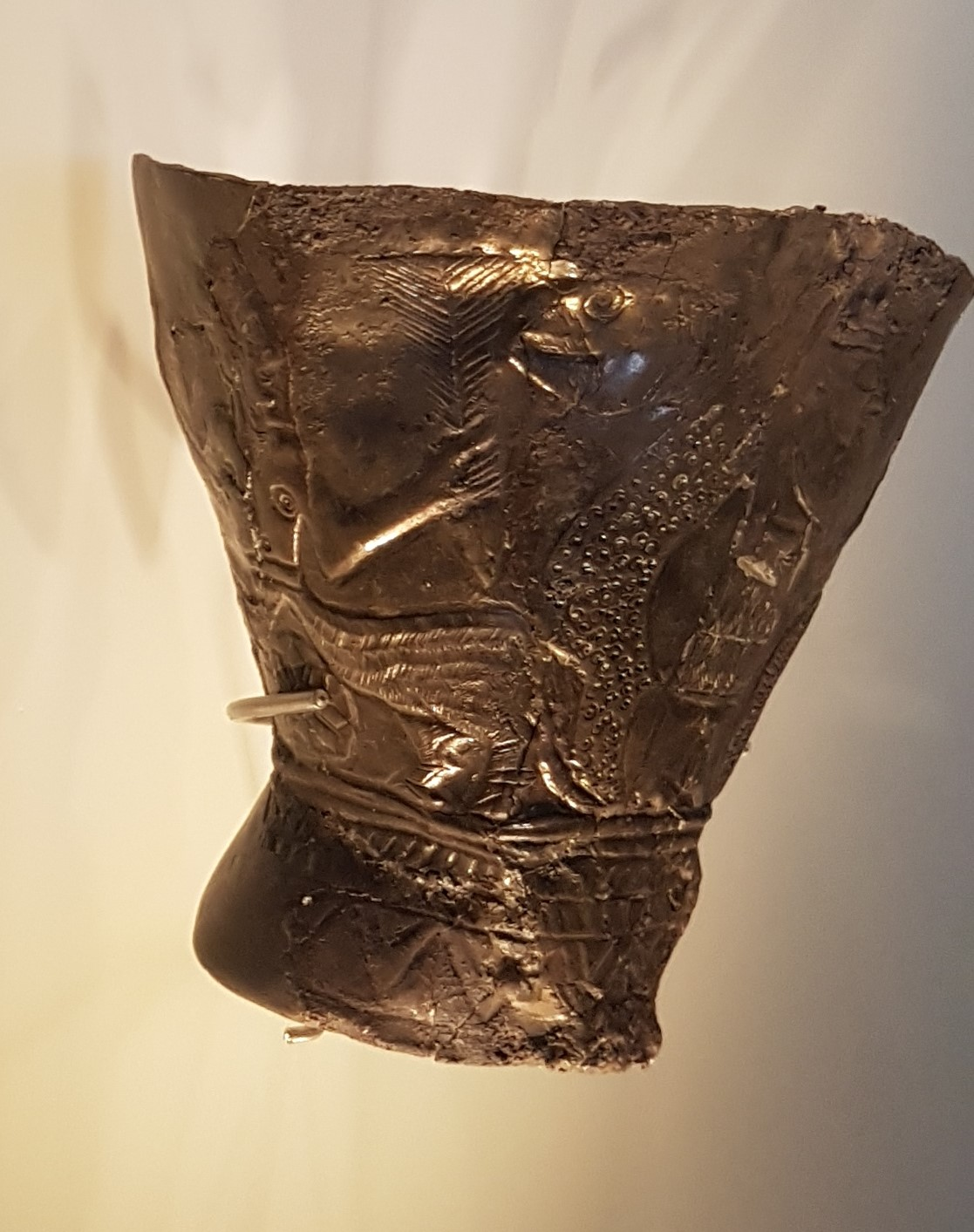

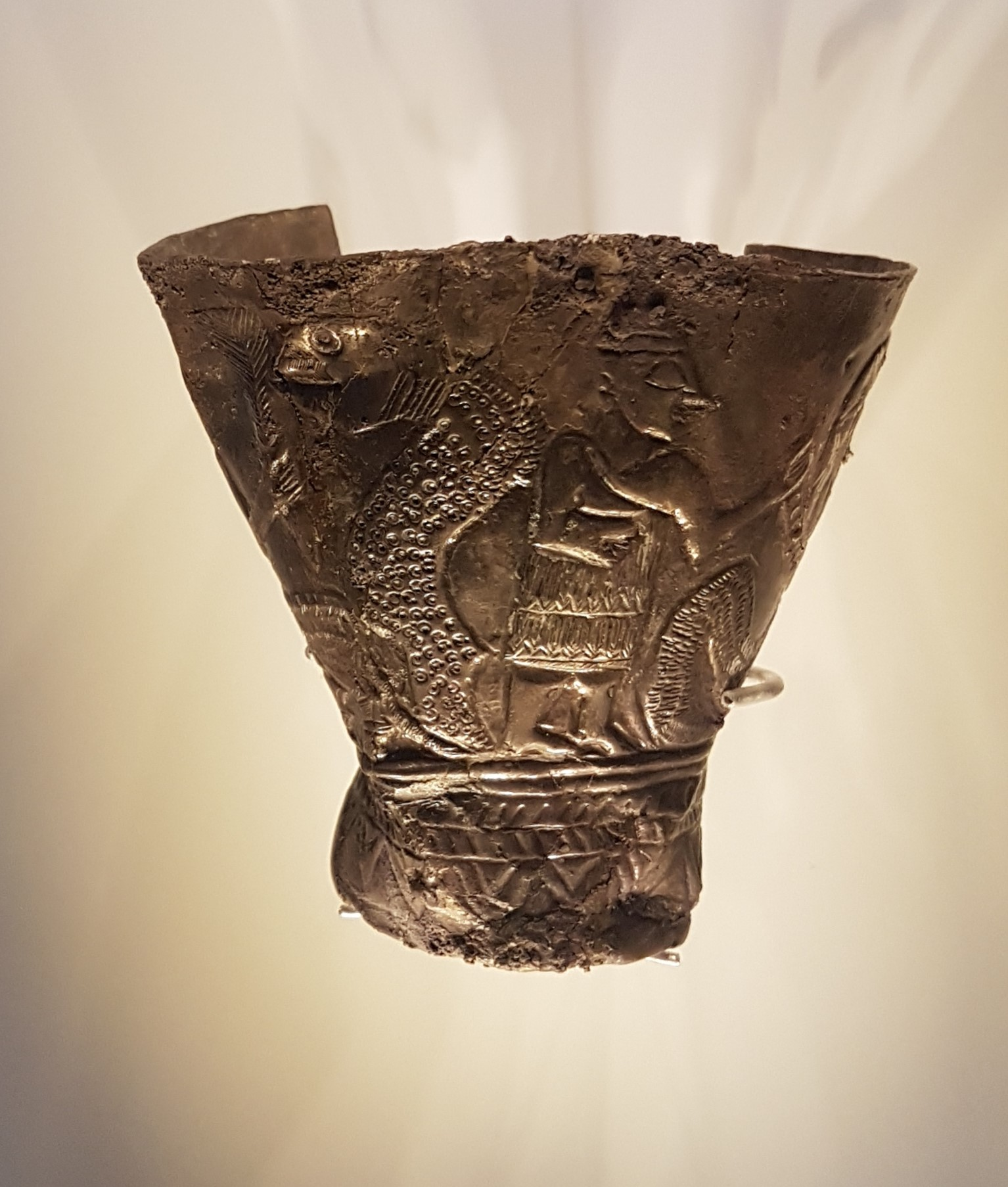

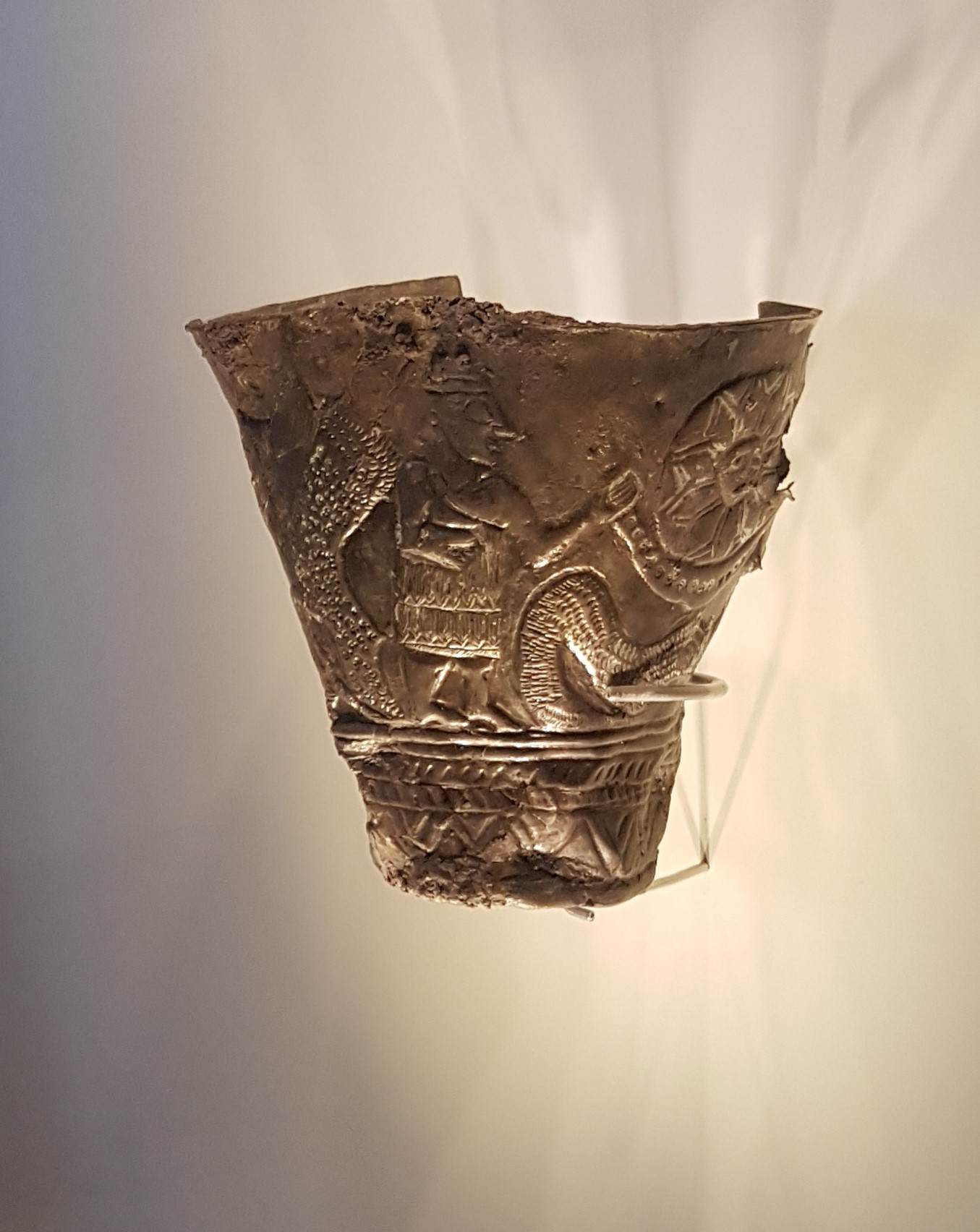
