= Deir Jarir =

West Bank town in Ramallah and al-Bireh Governorate

- Town

Arabic transcription(s)
  - Arabic: دير جرير
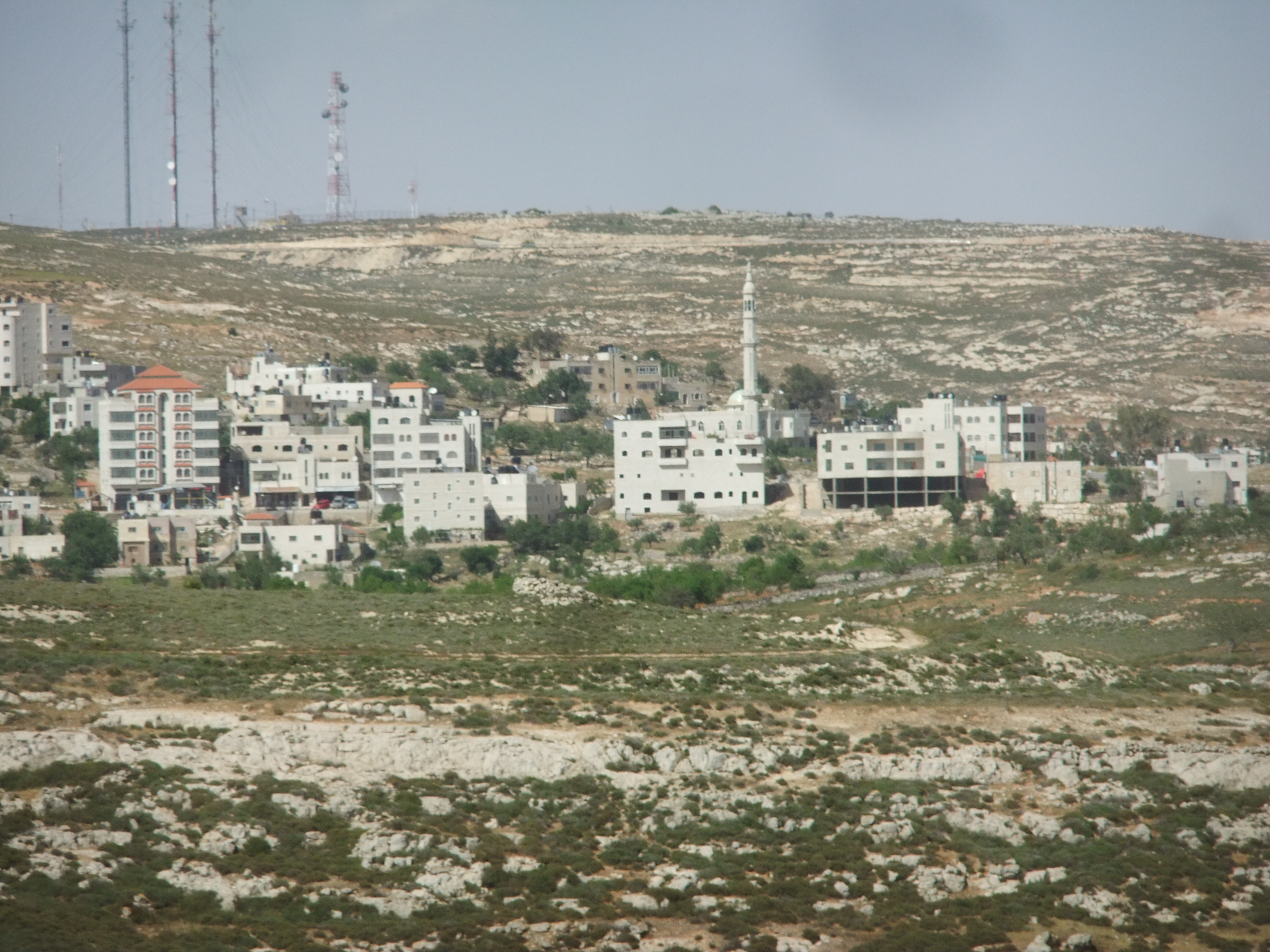
- Deir Jarir, in 2013

- Location of Deir Jarir
- Coordinates: 31°57′52″N 35°17′45″E
- Palestine grid: 178/152
- State: Palestine
- Governorate: Ramallah and al-Bireh

Area
  - Town: 33.357 km^{2} (12.879 sq mi)
  - Metro: 33.4 km^{2} (12.9 sq mi)
- Elevation: 698 m (2,290 ft)

Population (2017)
  - Town: 4,469
  - Density: 134.0/km^{2} (347.0/sq mi)
- Name meaning: The monastery or house of Jerir
- Website: www.deirjarir.ps

Deir Jarir (Arabic: دير جرير) is a Palestinian town in the Ramallah and al-Bireh Governorate of the State of Palestine, in the central West Bank, located twelve kilometers (7.5 miles) northeast of Ramallah. It is situated on a hilltop overlooking the Jordan Valley at an elevation of 900 metres (3,000 feet). According to the Palestinian Central Bureau of Statistics (PCBS), Deir Jarir had a population of 4,469 inhabitants in 2017.

It spreads across a large land area of 33,357 dunams (33.357 km^{2}), of which 17.2% is under the civil jurisdiction of the Palestinian National Authority (PNA) and the remainder under Israeli military control. Most of the land under PNA administration is urban, surrounded by grape vines, and groves of fig and olive trees. 76% of the town's area is open space.

== Location ==
Deir Jarir is located 12.2 kilometers (7.6 mi) northeast of Ramallah. It is bordered by Al Auja to the east, Kafr Malik and Al Mazra'a ash Sharqiya to the north, Silwad to the west, and Et Taiyiba to the south.

== Name ==
The village name means "the monastery/house of Jerir." 19th-century orientalist E. H. Palmer writes that it was named for the Arab poet Jarir ibn Atiyah.

== History ==
Sherds from the Mamluk era have been uncovered. In 1354, income from Deir Jarir was transferred to the waqf in Jerusalem to be used for the upkeep of the Khātūniyya Madrasa. In 1491-1492, annual revenue sent to the madrasa was 3,800 aspers.

=== Ottoman period ===
In 1517, Deir Jarir was incorporated into the Ottoman Empire with the rest of Palestine. In 1596 Dar Jarir appeared in the tax registers as being in the nahiya of Quds in the liwa of Quds. It had a population of 23 Muslim households. Taxes were paid on wheat, barley, olives, vineyards, fruit trees, occasional revenues, goats and/or bee hives; a total of 4,300 akçe. Shards from the early Ottoman era have also been found.

In 1838, Deir Jureir was described as a Muslim village in the Beni Murrah region north of Jerusalem.

When the French explorer Victor Guérin visited the village in 1863 and 1870, he found 200 inhabitants.

An Ottoman village list dating from 1870 records 111 houses and a population of 394 including men only.

In 1882, the PEF's Survey of Western Palestine described Dar Jerir as "a village of moderate size, with ancient tombs to the south, and a spring to the west; a few olives on the same side."

In 1896 the population of Deir Jarir was estimated to be about 828 persons.

=== British Mandate ===
In the 1922 census of Palestine, conducted by the British Mandate authorities, the village, named Dair Ijreer, had a population of 739, all Muslim. In the 1931 census the population of Deir Jarir was a total of 847, still entirely Muslim, in 172 inhabited houses.

In the 1945 statistics, the population of Deir Jarir was 1,080, all Muslims, who owned 33,161 dunams (33.2 km^{2}; 12.8 sq mi) of land according to an official land and population survey. 3,091 dunams were plantations and irrigable land, 6,499 used for cereals, while 40 dunams (4.0 ha; 9.9 acres) were built-up (urban) land.

=== Jordanian period ===
In the wake of the 1948 Arab–Israeli War, and after the 1949 Armistice Agreements, Deir Jarir came under Jordanian rule. It was annexed by Jordan in 1950.

The Jordanian census of 1961 found 1,474 inhabitants in Deir Jarir.

=== 1967-present ===
Since the Six-Day War in 1967, Deir Jarir has been under Israeli occupation. The population of Deir Jerir in the 1967 census conducted by the Israeli authorities was 1,275, 18 of whom originated from the Israeli territory.

After the 1995 accords, 15% of village land was classified as Area B, the remaining 85% as Area C. Israel has confiscated 1,264 of dunams of village land for the construction of the Israeli settlement of Kokhav HaShahar.

In September 2005, hundreds of armed residents from Deir Jarir attacked the nearby town of Taybeh due to a family feud. A Palestinian Christian from Taybeh was accused of having an affair with a Muslim woman from Deir Jarir. 13 houses were burned down and three men were arrested (two from Deir Jarir and one from Taybeh). According to the BBC, however, the towns are still friendly and consider themselves one family".

== See also ==
- Mitzpe Kramim

== Bibliography ==
- Barron, J.B., ed. (1923). Palestine: Report and General Abstracts of the Census of 1922. Government of Palestine.
- Burgoyne, Michael Hamilton (1987). Mamluk Jerusalem. ISBN 090503533X.
- Conder, C.R.; Kitchener, H.H. (1882). The Survey of Western Palestine: Memoirs of the Topography, Orography, Hydrography, and Archaeology. Vol. 2. London: Committee of the Palestine Exploration Fund.
- Finkelstein, I.; Lederman, Zvi, eds. (1997). Highlands of many cultures. Tel Aviv: Institute of Archaeology of Tel Aviv University Publications Section. ISBN 965-440-007-3.
- Government of Jordan, Department of Statistics (1964). First Census of Population and Housing. Volume I: Final Tables; General Characteristics of the Population (PDF).
- Government of Palestine, Department of Statistics (1945). Village Statistics, April, 1945.
- Guérin, V. (1868). Description Géographique Historique et Archéologique de la Palestine (in French). Vol. 1: Judee, pt. 1. Paris: L'Imprimerie Nationale.
- Guérin, V. (1874). Description Géographique Historique et Archéologique de la Palestine (in French). Vol. 2: Samarie, pt. 1. Paris: L'Imprimerie Nationale.
- Hadawi, S. (1970). Village Statistics of 1945: A Classification of Land and Area ownership in Palestine. Palestine Liberation Organization Research Center.
- Hartmann, M. (1883). "Die Ortschaftenliste des Liwa Jerusalem in dem türkischen Staatskalender für Syrien auf das Jahr 1288 der Flucht (1871)". Zeitschrift des Deutschen Palästina-Vereins. 6: 102–149.
- Hütteroth, W.-D.; Abdulfattah, K. (1977). Historical Geography of Palestine, Transjordan and Southern Syria in the Late 16th Century. Erlanger Geographische Arbeiten, Sonderband 5. Erlangen, Germany: Vorstand der Fränkischen Geographischen Gesellschaft. ISBN 3-920405-41-2.'
- Mills, E., ed. (1932). Census of Palestine 1931. Population of Villages, Towns and Administrative Areas. Jerusalem: Government of Palestine.
- Palmer, E.H. (1881). The Survey of Western Palestine: Arabic and English Name Lists Collected During the Survey by Lieutenants Conder and Kitchener, R. E. Transliterated and Explained by E.H. Palmer. Committee of the Palestine Exploration Fund.
- Robinson, E.; Smith, E. (1841). Biblical Researches in Palestine, Mount Sinai and Arabia Petraea: A Journal of Travels in the year 1838. Vol. 2. Boston: Crocker & Brewster.
- Robinson, E.; Smith, E. (1841). Biblical Researches in Palestine, Mount Sinai and Arabia Petraea: A Journal of Travels in the year 1838. Vol. 3. Boston: Crocker & Brewster.
- Schick, C. (1896). "Zur Einwohnerzahl des Bezirks Jerusalem". Zeitschrift des Deutschen Palästina-Vereins. 19: 120–127.
- Socin, A. (1879). "Alphabetisches Verzeichniss von Ortschaften des Paschalik Jerusalem". Zeitschrift des Deutschen Palästina-Vereins. 2: 135–163.
