= Mitzpe Kramim =

Coordinates: 31.9576°N 35.3569°E

Mitzpe Kramim (Hebrew: מצפה כרמים, lit. Vineyards Lookout) is an Israeli outpost in the West Bank. Located on a mountain ridge overlooking the Jordan Valley, it falls under the jurisdiction of the Mateh Binyamin Regional Council.

It is built, as ruled by the Israeli Supreme Court on 25 August 2020, on private lands owned by residents of the Palestinian village of Deir Jarir. The international community considers Israeli settlements in the West Bank illegal under international law, but the Israeli and United States governments dispute this.

== Demographics ==
According to the Mateh Binyamin Regional Council, 42 families live in Mitzpe Kramim as of July 2022.

== History ==
Mitzpe Keramim was established in 1999 on the Israeli Independence Day near the Israeli settlement of Kokhav HaShahar. Several second-generation families from Kokhav HaShahar moved to a hill south of the village.

Less than a year later, after an agreement with the Ehud Barak government, the group was relocated to a hilltop closer to Kokhav HaShahar. However, only a few months later, a new village, Ma'ale Shlomo, was established on the original site.

=== Land dispute ===
In 2011, a group of Palestinians from the village of Deir Jarir claiming ownership over the land on which the outpost sits, submitted a petition to the High Court of Justice to have the community of some 40 families removed. A Jerusalem District Court judge ruled in 2018 that the settlement doesn't need to be razed because it was built "in good faith" and the residents have rights to the property.

The decision was based on a policy known as "market regulation" that is used in Israeli Law whenever authorities grant building rights to unowned land and only after the building is up and residents live there, a claim is made on the land that was not known at the time of authorization. A Supreme Court ruling from August 2020 overturned this decision but in July 2022 reversed its own decision and accepted the state's argument.

According to the Palestinian Applied Research Institute–Jerusalem (ARIJ), Israeli settlers "forcefully seized" land from the Palestinian villages of Deir Jarir and Kafr Malik in order to build Mitzpe Kramim.
