= Ein Samiya =

Depopulated Palestinian village in Ramallah and al-Bireh, State of Palestine

Ein Samiya عين سامية
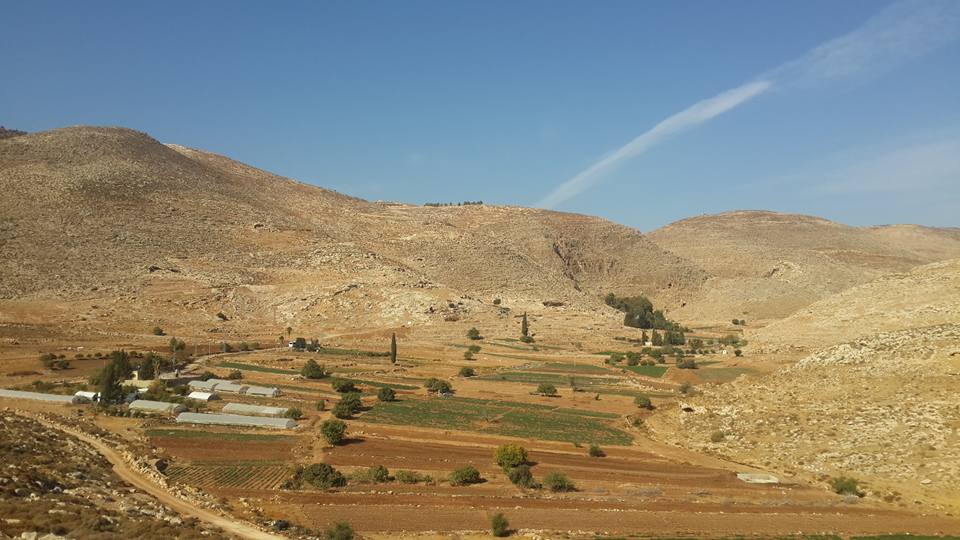
- Ein Samiya

- Location of Ein Samiya within Palestine
- Coordinates: 31°59′21″N 35°20′00″E
- Palestine grid: 181/156
- State: State of Palestine
- Governorate: Ramallah and al-Bireh
- Elevation: 430 m (1,410 ft)

Population
  - Total: 0−300
- Name meaning: "the lofty spring

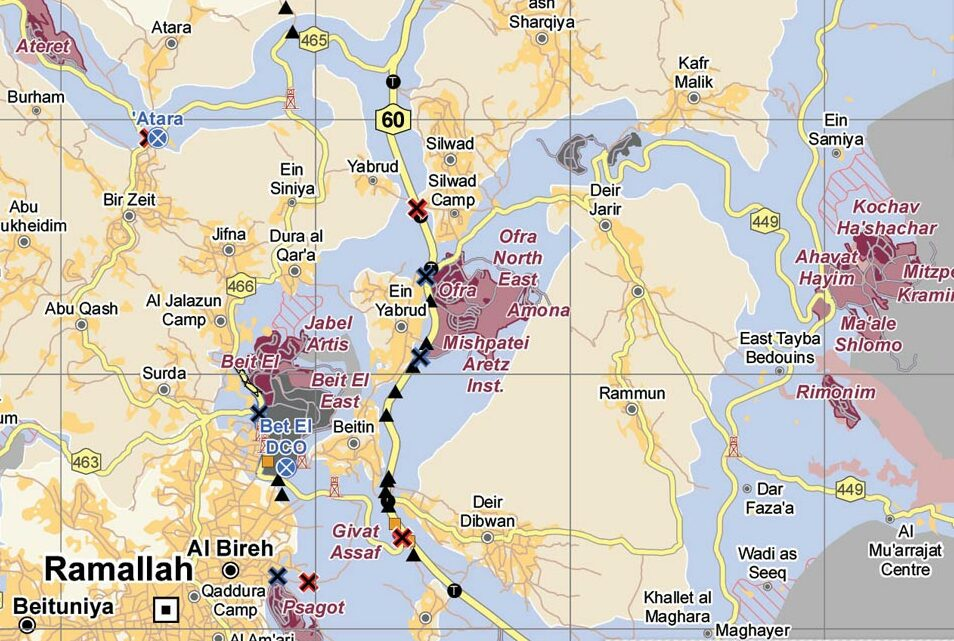
Ein Samiya (top right)

Ein Samiya, also known as Ain Samia (Arabic: عين سامية, meaning "the lofty spring"), is a Palestinian village in Area C of the Ramallah and al-Bireh Governorate, on the eastern plains of the village of Kafr Malik. It developed as a historical dependency of Kafr Malik.

Due to its large water spring, considered to be the strongest and purest in the region, the Ein Samiya valley is an important archaeological area containing the remains of settlements dating back to the ancient Bronze Age/Canaanite era, as well as Roman and Islamic periods. In modern times, Ein Samiya's spring water is the main local ingredient of Taybeh beer, Palestine's first local beer.

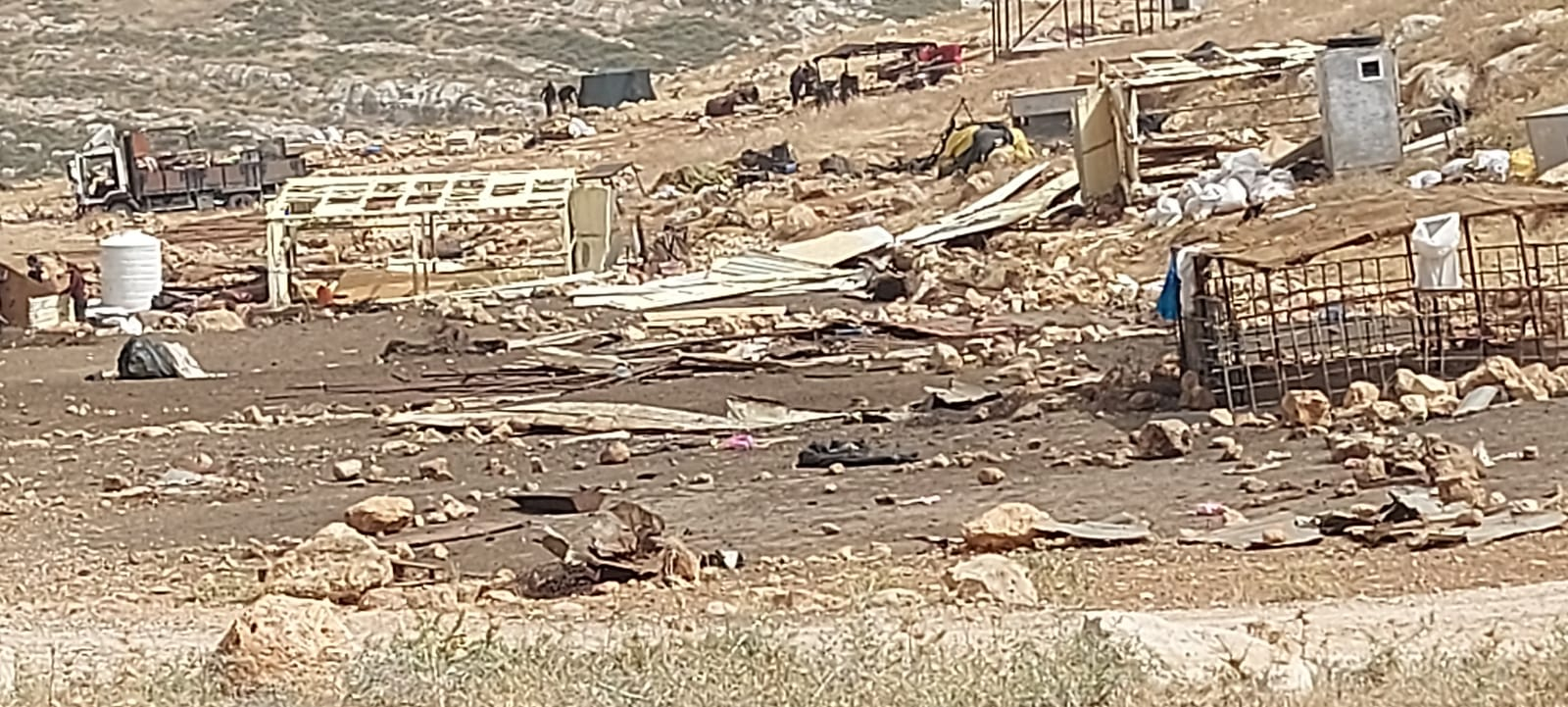
Ein Samiya after forced evacuation

In May 2023, Israeli authorities ethnically cleansed the village with its 178 residents. Acting Humanitarian Coordinator for the Occupied Palestinian Territory, Yvonne Helle, noted that: "These families are not leaving by choice; the Israeli authorities have repeatedly demolished homes and other structures they own and have threatened to destroy their only school. At the same time, land available for the grazing of livestock has decreased due to settlement expansion and both children and adults have been subjected to settler violence... We are witnessing the tragic consequences of longstanding Israeli practices and settler violence."

The persistent harassment of the Palestinian villagers, leading to their evacuation in 2023, is considered to be part of the Israeli expropriation of Palestinian springs in the West Bank.

== Location ==
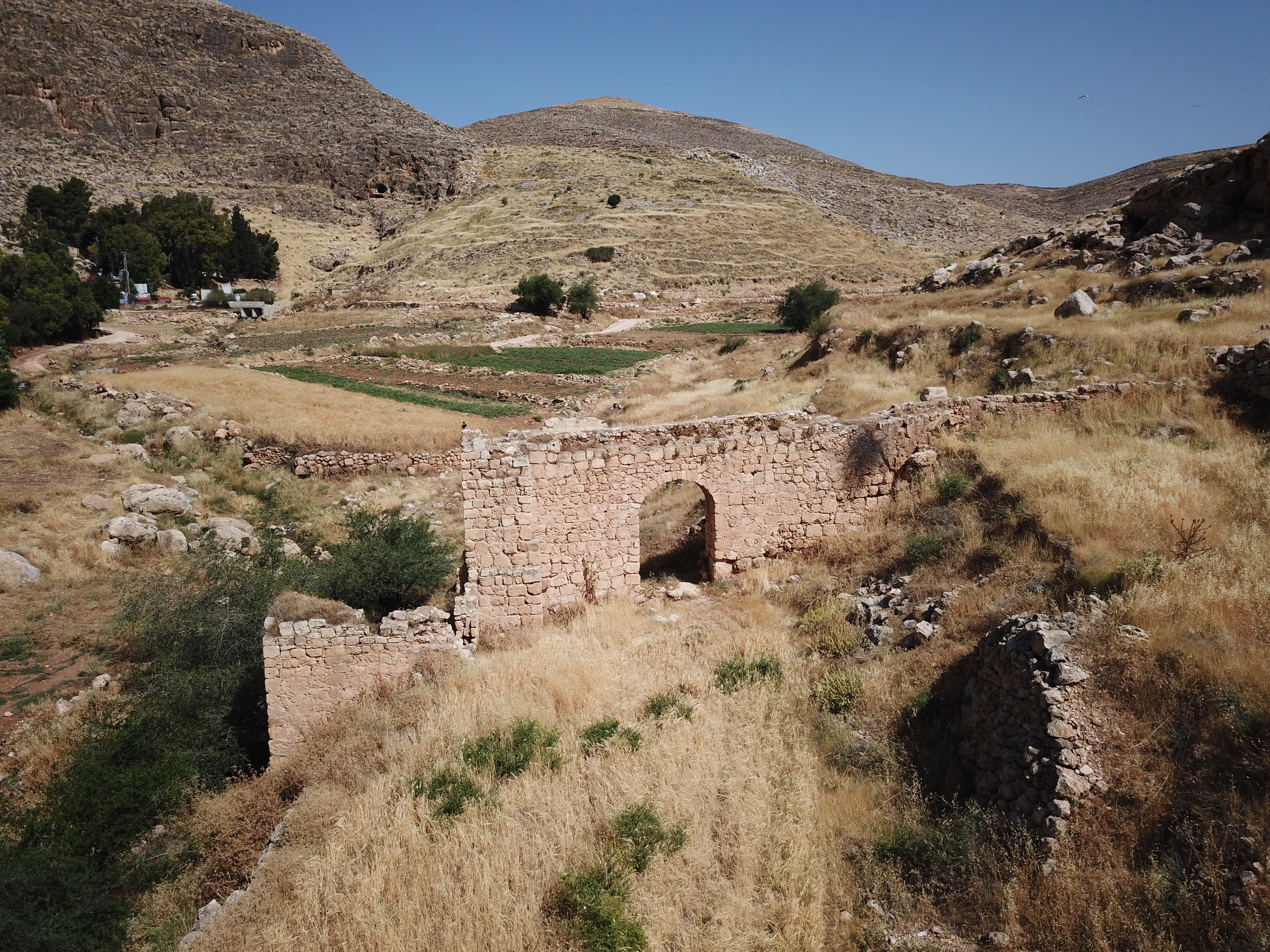
Ein Samiya aqueduct

The town is located on the eastern slopes of the Ramallah mountains, and the town's territory reaches Al-Auja in the Jordan Valley in the east of the West Bank.

== Economy ==
Ein Samiya is a prominent water spring, renowned for being the strongest and purest in the region. It supplies water to the cities of Ramallah and Al-Bireh. Historically, extensive networks of water channels were constructed around it. The village serves as the food basket of the town of Kafr Malik, where grains, thyme, citrus fruits, and vegetables are grown.

== Population ==
Most of the population is from the Bedouin Ka'abneh (Arabic: الكعابنة) clan, primarily employed in the government and agriculture sectors.

== History and archaeology ==
Dating back more than 7,000 years, Ein Samiya contains what is considered one of the oldest historical ruins in the world. It also includes more than 150 rock-carved Roman tombs and related tunnels. Numerous archaeological expeditions took place in 1941-42 and in 1963.

The area includes many historical symbols that indicate the cultural diversity in the place, and the site of "Tel Al-Marzbanah" north of Ein Samia is one of the most prominent archaeological sites in it, and it is a small high site that extends from north to south. The origin of the name goes back to the Persian language, as Marzipan means minister. The 'Ain Samiya goblet was found here.

Sherds, dating to the Roman, Byzantine and Byzantine/Umayyad eras have been found here. A column dating from year 557 in the Byzantine era, mentioning Justinian I and bishop Eustochius, have been found here.

Denys Pringle, citing information from Ronnie Ellenblum, writes in 1997 that there are buildings at 'Ain Samiya (grid: 1817/1550), that could date to the Crusader era.

=== Ottoman era ===
The village is not mentioned in the first Ottoman census, in 1525-1526 CE (AH 932), but is mentioned (taxed) in the 1538-1539 (949) census. In the 1596 census, the village had a population was 4 households, all Muslim. The villagers paid a fixed tax rate of 33,3% on various agricultural products, such as wheat (400 akçe), barley (560), olive trees (120), in addition to "occasional revenues" (80) and goats and bee hives (40); a total of 1,200 akçe. Sherds, dating from the early Ottoman ra have also been found here.

In 1838, es-Samieh was noted as a Muslim village in the District of Beni Salim; located east of Jerusalem.

In 1870, Victor Guérin described the ruins there: "The ruin is close to the 'Ain el Samieh. This spring flows under a chamber with circular vaulting and built of large blocks : near it lie several fragments of columns in stone and capitals imitating the Doric style. To the north and above the spring I remarked the ruins of a considerable building, intended perhaps to protect it, and constructed of gigantic blocks rudely hewn. On the lower slopes of the mountain a great many grottoes have been cut in the rock". He also noted that the fields were cultivated with lentils, beans and wheat by the fellahin from Kafr Malik. At the time of sowing and harvesting, several of the caves at Ein Samiya served as temporary refuge for these families.

In 1882, the PEF's Survey of Western Palestine described Khurbet Samieh: "Ruined village, with a tower and springs; appears to have been inhabited within the present century. The ruins occur close to 'Ain Samieh as marked on the map. There are remains of two mills, and the ruins of foundations, walls and caves, cover a large area. A copious spring issues on the north-west side of the valley from a strongly-built wall forming a tank. A fragment of a column and some drafted stones are built into this wall".

== Gallery ==
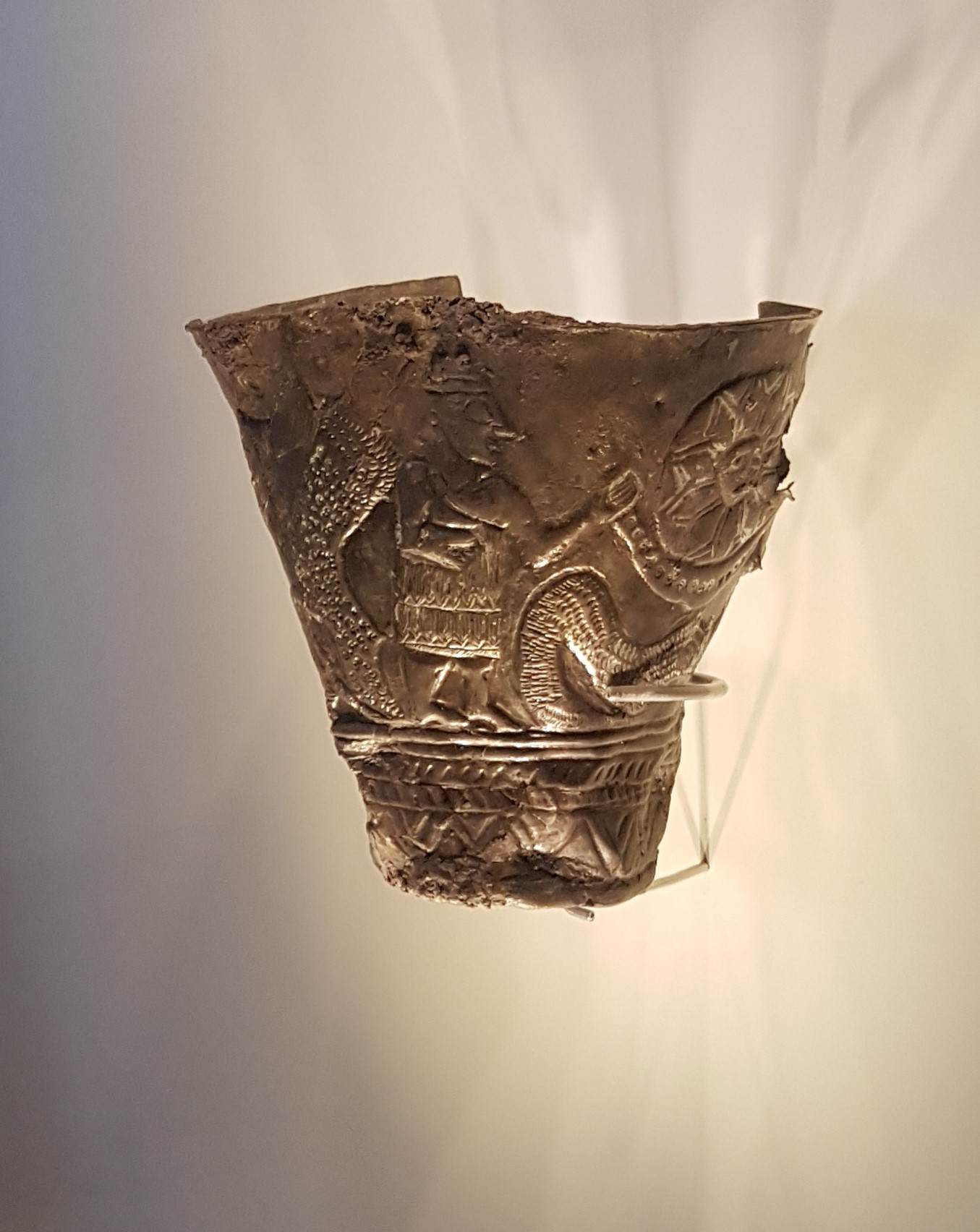
'Ain Samiya goblet, from Middle Bronze Age I (2300-2000 BC)

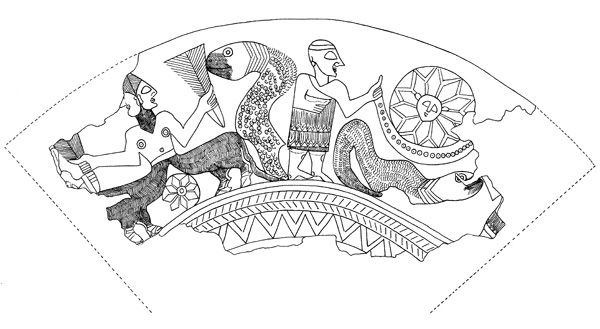
A flat rendering of the scenes depicted on the Ain Samiya Goblet

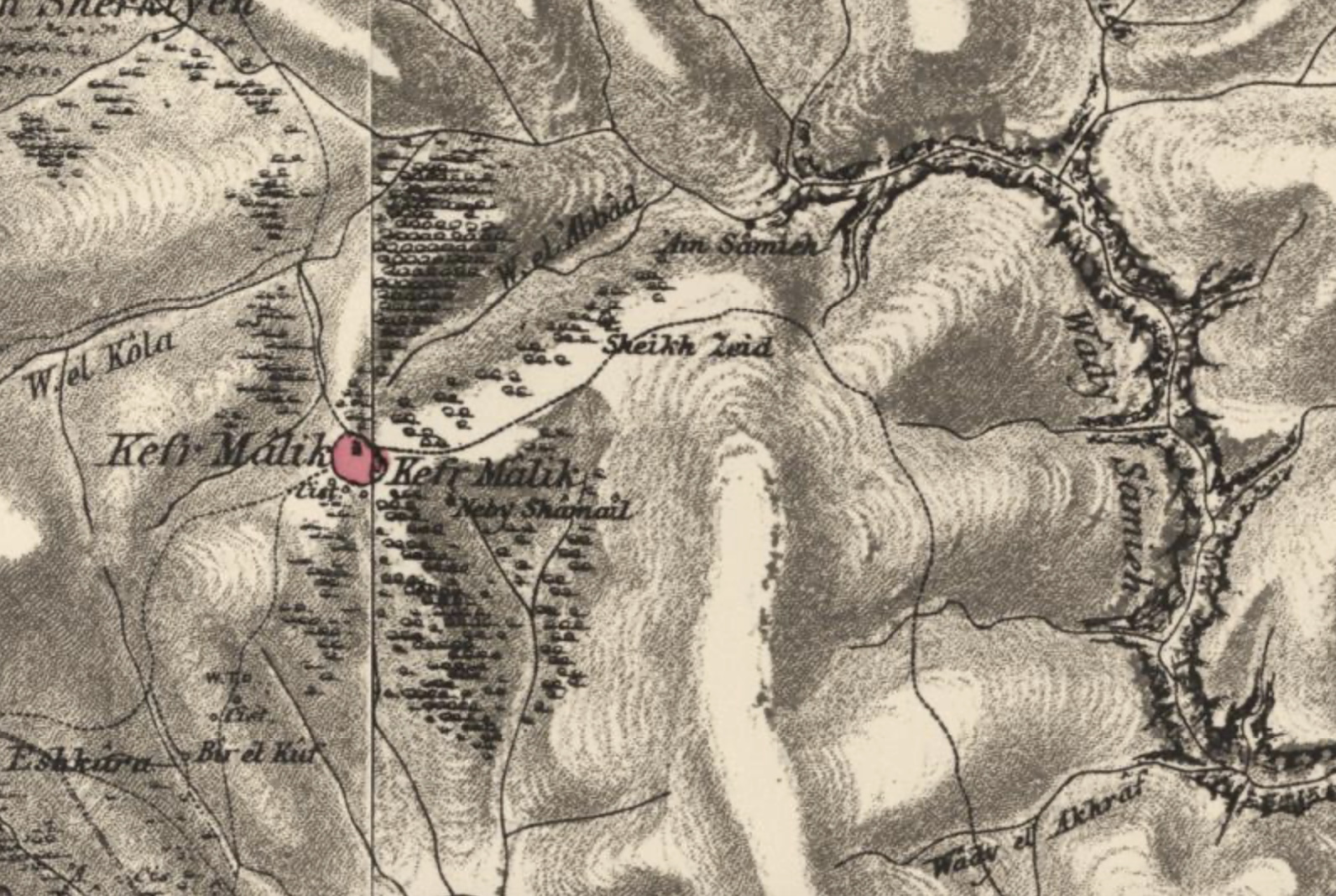
Kafr Malik and Ein Samiya in the 1880s

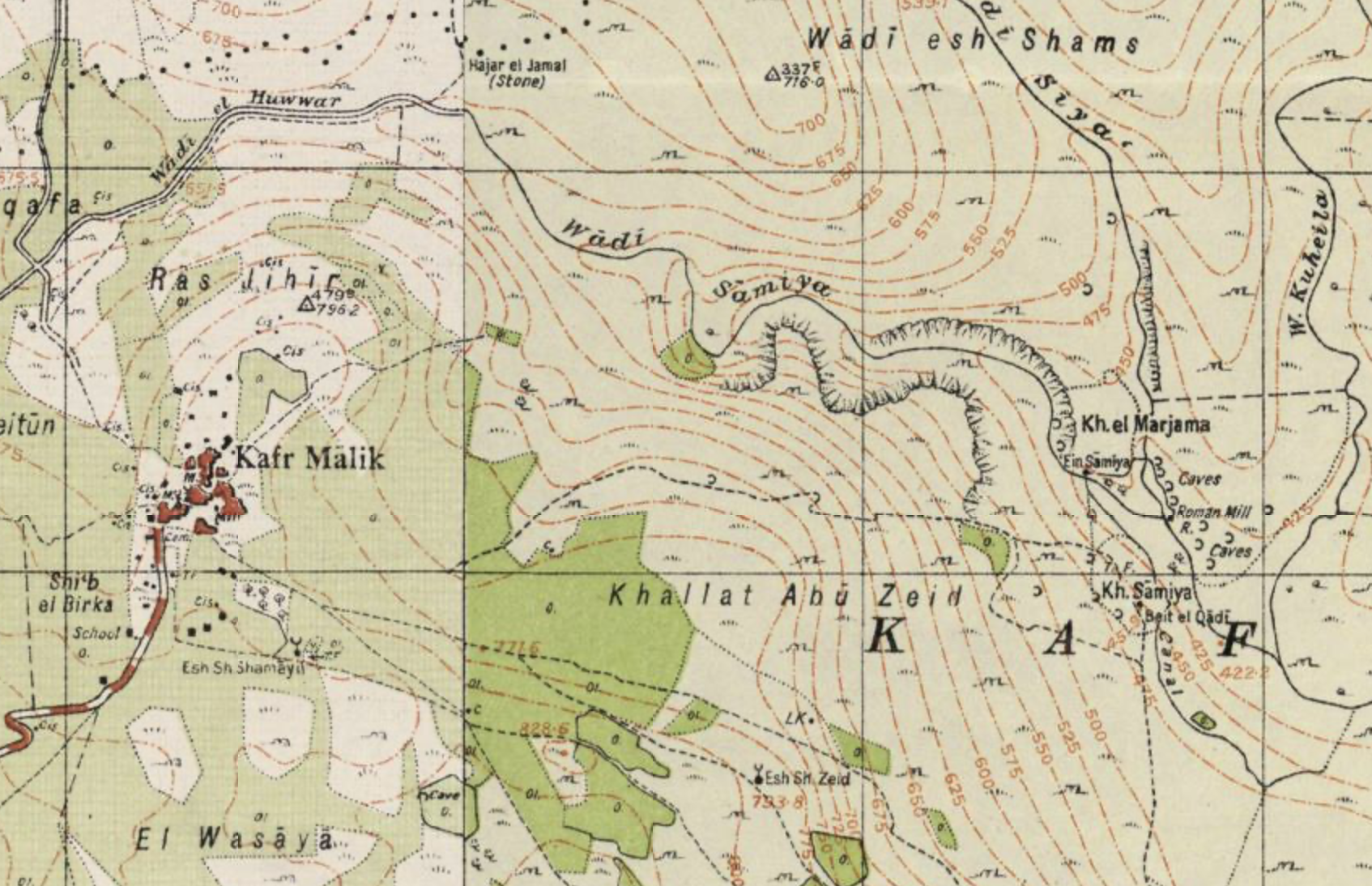
Kafr Malik and Ein Samiya in the 1940s

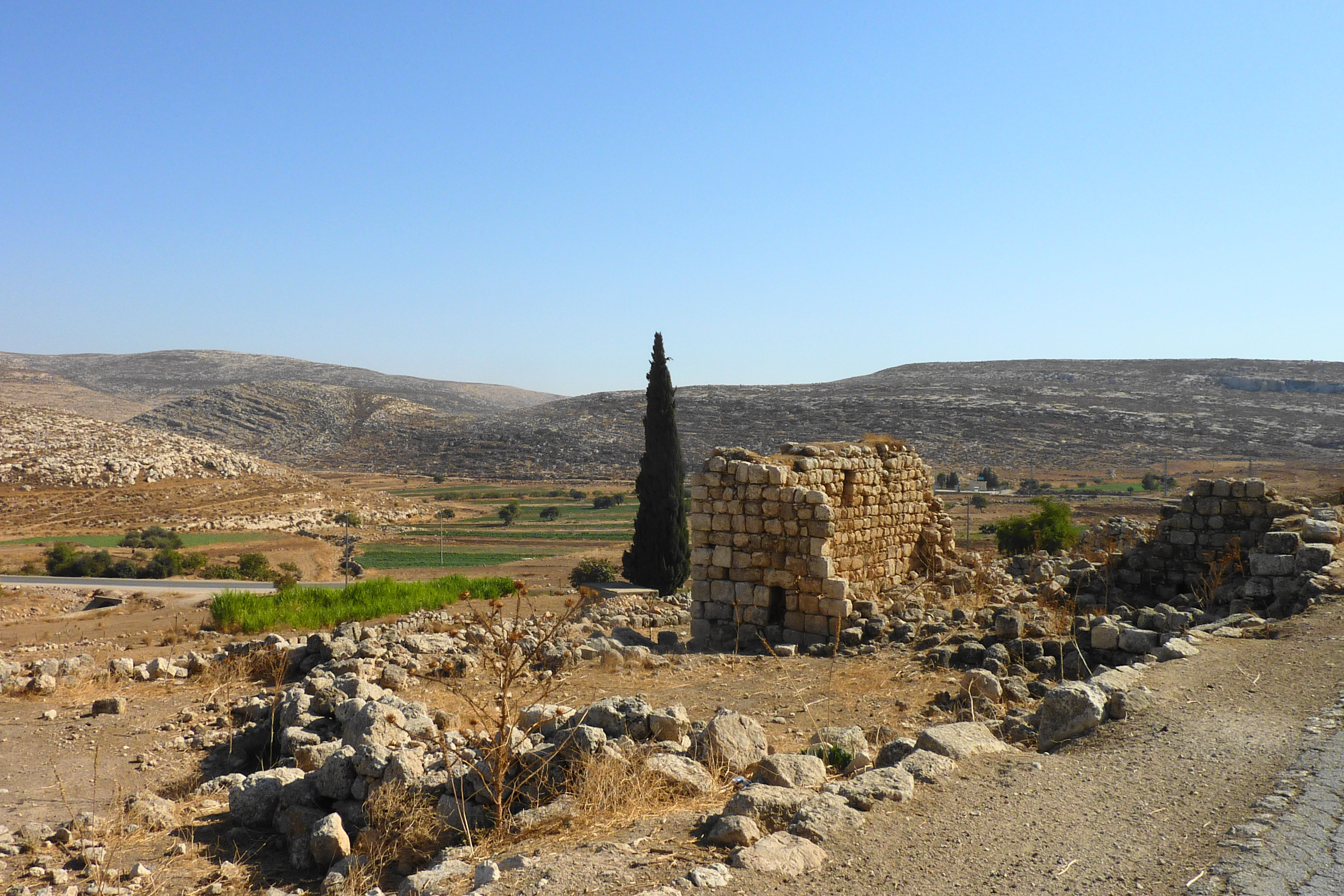
Oasis of Ein Samia - panoramio, 2010

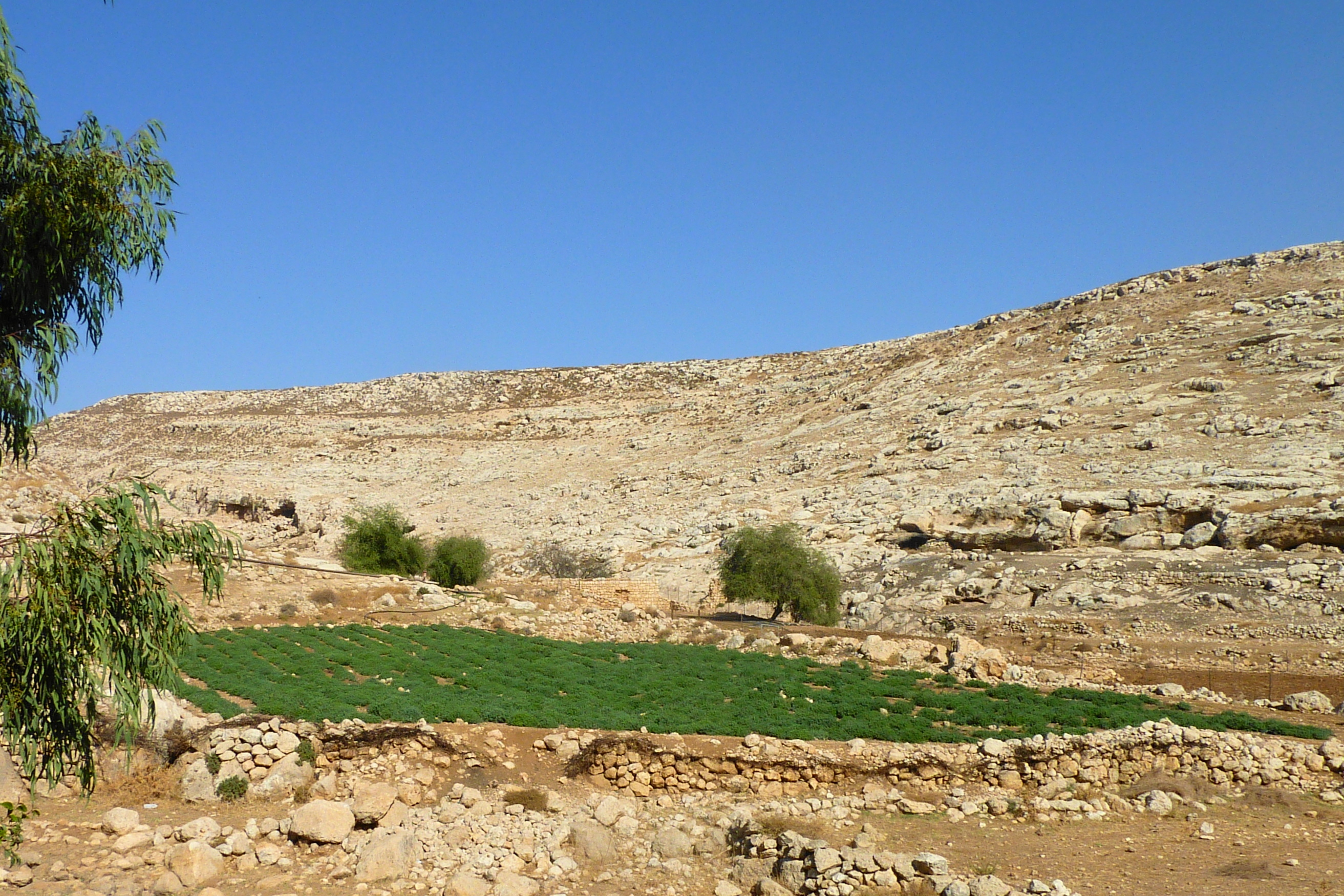
Cultivated fields at Ein Samiya, 2010

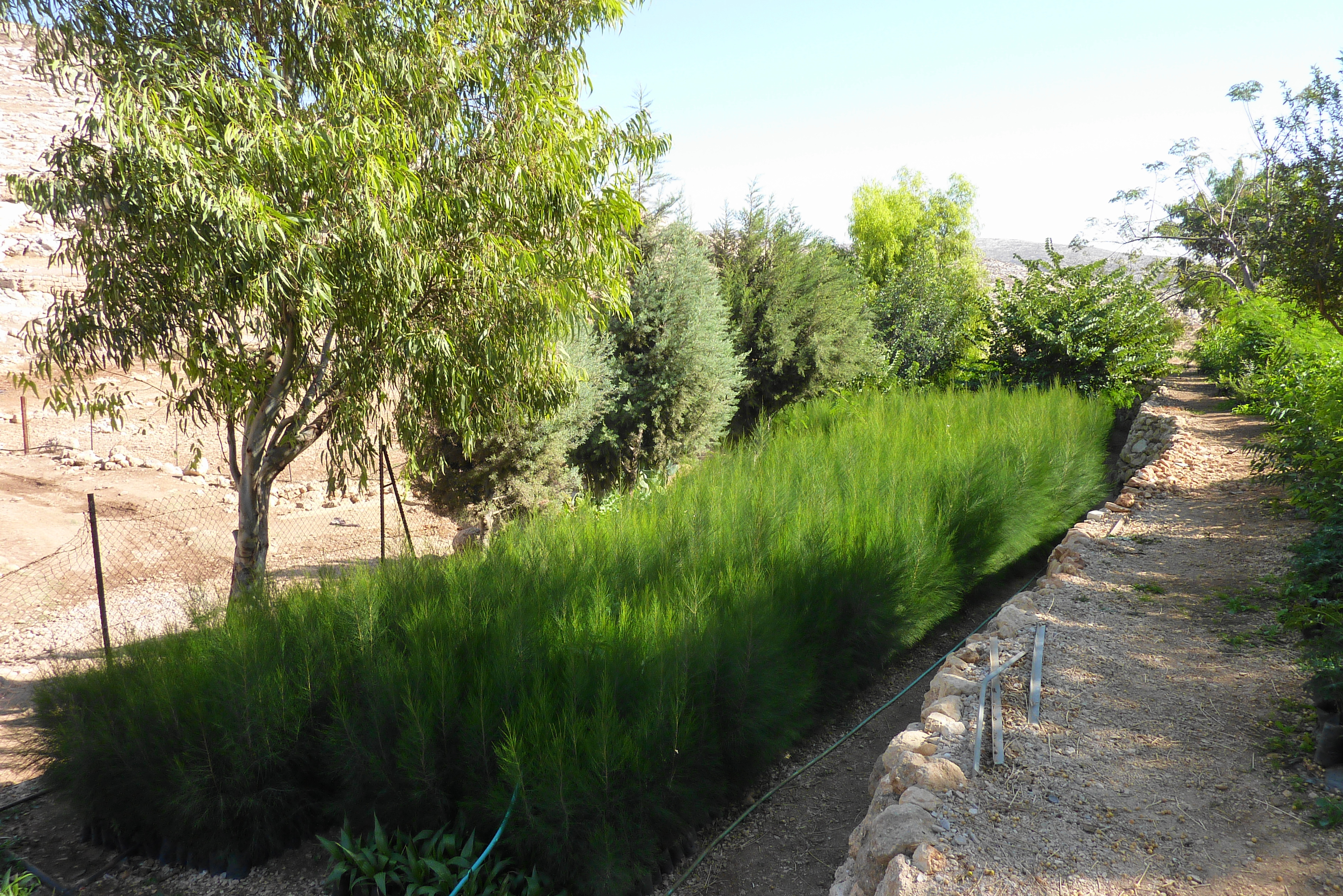
Oasis of Ein Samiya, 2010

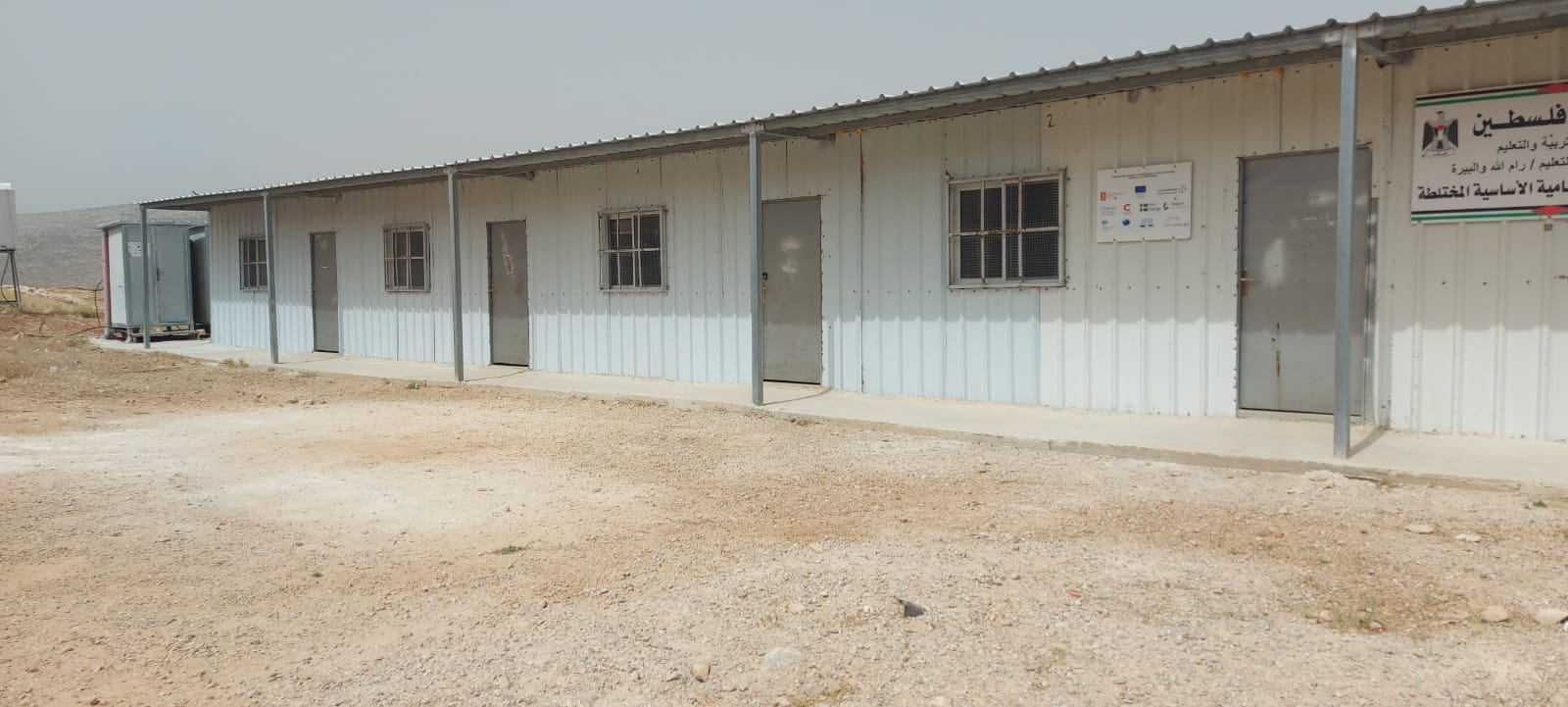
School in Ein Samiya, 2 May 2023

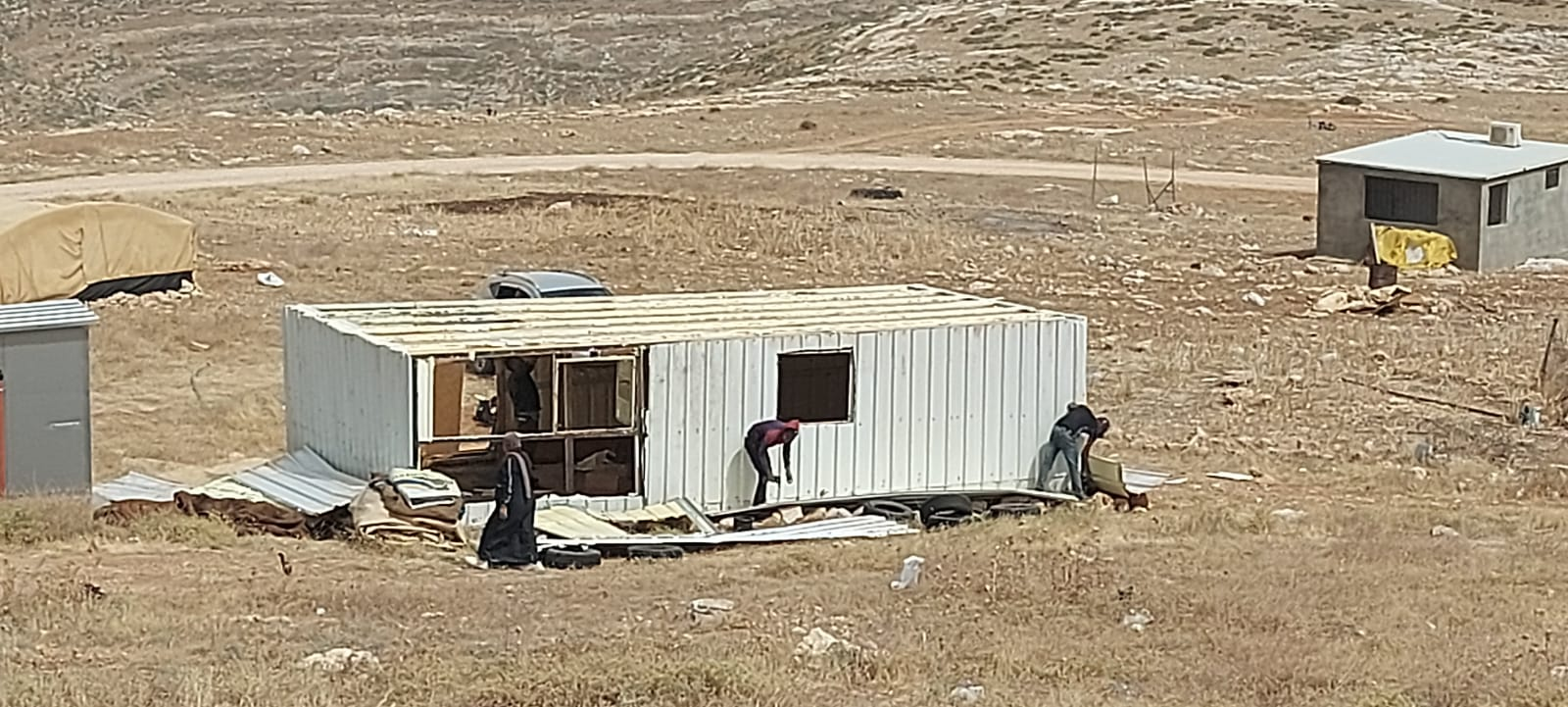
Evacuation of Ein Samiya, 25 May 2023

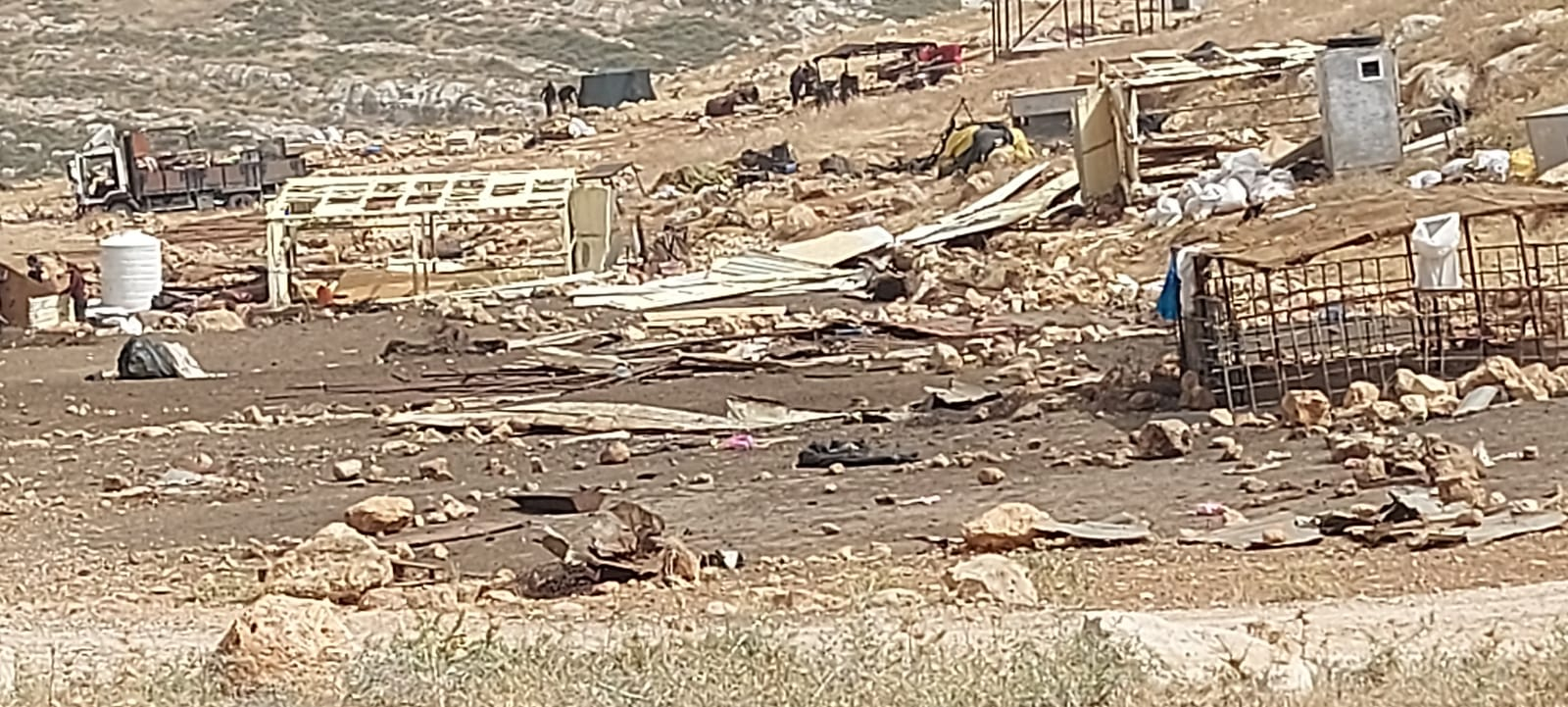
Ein Samiya after evacuation, 25 May 2023

== Bibliography ==
- Abel, F.-M. (1907). "Document ephigraphique sur le patriarche Eustochios". Revue Biblique. 16: 275-276.
- Conder, C.R.; Kitchener, H.H. (1882). The Survey of Western Palestine: Memoirs of the Topography, Orography, Hydrography, and Archaeology. Vol. 2. London: Committee of the Palestine Exploration Fund.
- Dauphin, C. (1998). La Palestine byzantine, Peuplement et Populations. BAR International Series 726 (in French). Vol. III : Catalogue. Oxford: Archeopress. ISBN 0-860549-05-4.
- Finkelstein, I.; Lederman, Zvi, eds. (1997). Highlands of many cultures. Tel Aviv: Institute of Archaeology of Tel Aviv University Publications Section. ISBN 965-440-007-3.
- Guérin, V. (1874). Description Géographique Historique et Archéologique de la Palestine (in French). Vol. 2: Samarie, pt. 1. Paris: L'Imprimerie Nationale.
- Hütteroth, W.-D.; Abdulfattah, K. (1977). Historical Geography of Palestine, Transjordan and Southern Syria in the Late 16th Century. Erlanger Geographische Arbeiten, Sonderband 5. Erlangen, Germany: Vorstand der Fränkischen Geographischen Gesellschaft. ISBN 3-920405-41-2.
- Macalister, R.A.S. (1907). "Some New Inscriptions from Jerusalem and its Neighbourhood". Quarterly Statement - Palestine Exploration Fund. 39: 234–239.
- Palmer, E.H. (1881). The Survey of Western Palestine: Arabic and English Name Lists Collected During the Survey by Lieutenants Conder and Kitchener, R. E. Transliterated and Explained by E.H. Palmer. Committee of the Palestine Exploration Fund.
- Pringle, D. (1997). Secular buildings in the Crusader Kingdom of Jerusalem: an archaeological Gazetter. Cambridge University Press. ISBN 0521-46010-7.
- Robinson, E.; Smith, E. (1841). Biblical Researches in Palestine, Mount Sinai and Arabia Petraea: A Journal of Travels in the year 1838. Vol. 3. Boston: Crocker & Brewster.
- Toledano, E. (1984). "The Sanjaq of Jerusalem in the Sixteenth Century: Aspects of Topography and Population". Archivum Ottomanicum. 9: 279–319. Archived from the original on 2016-03-05.
- Tsafrir, Y.; Leah Di Segni; Judith Green (1994). (TIR): Tabula Imperii Romani: Judaea, Palaestina. Jerusalem: Israel Academy of Sciences and Humanities. ISBN 965-208-107-8.
