= Kafr Malik =

- Municipality type C

Arabic transcription(s)
  - Arabic: كفر مالك
  - Latin: Kofr Malik (official)
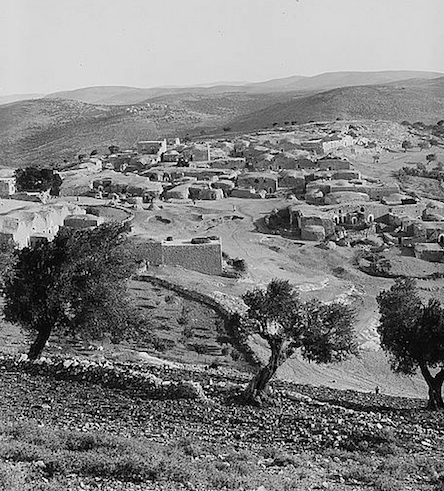
- Kafr Malik, between 1900 and 1920

- Location of Kafr Malik within Palestine
- Coordinates: 31°59′23″N 35°18′32″E
- Palestine grid: 179/155
- State: State of Palestine
- Governorate: Ramallah and al-Bireh

Government
  - Type: Municipality
  - Head of Municipality: Majid Fahmi Abdel Majid M'adi

Population (2017)
  - Total: 2,946
- Name meaning: The village of the landlord

Kafr Malik (Arabic: كفر مالك) is a Palestinian town in the Ramallah and al-Bireh Governorate of the State of Palestine, located 17 kilometers Northeast of Ramallah in the northern West Bank. According to the Palestinian Central Bureau of Statistics (PCBS), the town had a population of 2,946 inhabitants in 2017.

== Location ==
Kafr Malik is a Palestinian village in Ramallah Governorate, located 13.8 km northeast of Ramallah. It is bordered by Al Mughayyir to the east, Al Mughayyir and Khirbet abu Falah to the north, Al Mazra'a ash Sharqiya to the west, and by Deir Jarir to the south.

== History ==
About two km east of Kafr Malik, at 'Ain Samiya (grid: 1817/1550), are buildings, possibly dating to the Crusader era.

Kafr Malik has been identified with the village Caphermelic of the Crusader period. In addition, Kafr Malik has been suggested as being identical to Beth HaMelekh, where Hasmonean king Alexander Jannaeus besieged his Pharisee adversaries.

=== Ottoman era ===
Kafr Malik was incorporated into the Ottoman Empire in 1517 with all of Palestine, and in 1596 it appeared in the tax registers as being in the nahiya of Al-Quds in the liwa of Al-Quds. It had a population of 21 household, who were all Muslims. They paid a fixed tax-rate of 33,3 % on agricultural products, including wheat, barley, olive trees, vineyards, fruit trees, goats and beehives, in addition to occasional revenues; a total of 7,750 akçe.

In 1838, ‘’Kefr Malik’’ was noted as a Muslim village in the District of Beni Salim, east of Jerusalem.

In 1870, Victor Guérin found Kafr Malik to have 350 inhabitants, some thirty Catholics and fifteen "schismatic Greek"; the others were Muslim. In the courtyard of the medhafeh, or guesthouse, he was shown several beautiful stone plaques and three sections of columns and several capitals of the Doric form belonging to an old edifice long since destroyed.

An Ottoman village list of about 1870 counted a population of 416 Muslims in 77 houses, and 15 Christians in 6 houses. In total 432 persons in 83 houses, though the population count included men, only.

In 1882, the PEF's Survey of Western Palestine described Kefr Malik as: "a village of moderate size on high ground."

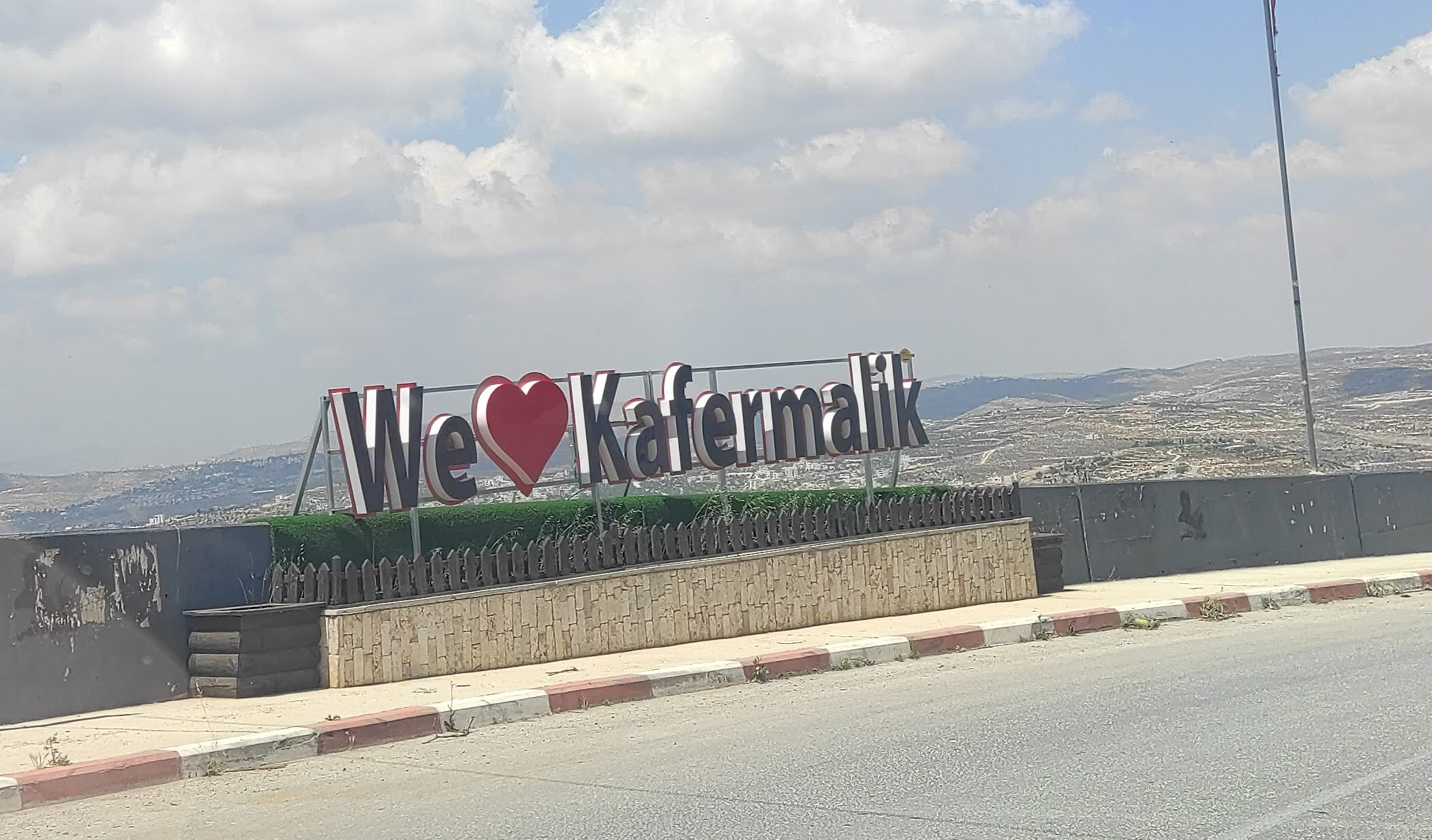
Welcome sign to kafer Malik

In 1896 the population of Kefr Malik was estimated to be about 870 persons.

=== British Mandate era ===
In the 1922 census of Palestine conducted by the British Mandate authorities, the village, called Kufr Malek, had a population of 943, all Muslims, increasing in the 1931 census to 972; 922 Muslims and 20 Christians, in 217 houses.

In the 1945 statistics the population was 1,100; 1,080 Muslims and 20 Christians, while the total land area was 52,196 dunams, according to an official land and population survey. Of this, 3,580 were allocated for plantations and irrigable land, 10,984 for cereals, while 53 dunams were classified as built-up areas.

=== Jordanian era ===
In the wake of the 1948 Arab–Israeli War, and after the 1949 Armistice Agreements, Kafr Malik came under Jordanian rule.

The Jordanian census of 1961 found 1,346 inhabitants in Kafr Malik.

=== 1967-present ===
Damage from an Israeli settler attack June 2023

Since the Six-Day War in 1967, Kafr Malik has been under Israeli occupation.

After the 1995 accords, 12,7% of Kafr Malik land is defined as Area B land, while the remaining 87,3% is defined as Area C. Israel has confiscated land from Kafr Malik for the Israeli settlements of Kokhav HaShahar and Mitzpe Kramim.

In June 2023, it was the target – along with nearby Turmus Ayya and several other Palestinian villages – of Israeli settler terror attacks. After the attack, the Israel Defense Forces (IDF) spokesperson called the incursions and attacks by armed Jewish settlers "acts of terror conducted by criminals", adding that the IDF had “failed to prevent” the attacks, described as “very grave”, and that such incidents "create terror" by pushing the attacked civilian populations "towards extremism".

In June 2025, 3 people from Kafr Malik were shot and killed by the Israeli military after Israeli settlers attacked the village.

== Bibliography ==
- Barron, J.B., ed. (1923). Palestine: Report and General Abstracts of the Census of 1922. Government of Palestine.
- Clermont-Ganneau, C.S. (1874). "Letters from M. Clermont-Ganneau". Quarterly Statement - Palestine Exploration Fund. 6: 135–178.
- Conder, C.R.; Kitchener, H.H. (1882). The Survey of Western Palestine: Memoirs of the Topography, Orography, Hydrography, and Archaeology. Vol. 2. London: Committee of the Palestine Exploration Fund.
- Finkelstein, I.; Lederman, Zvi, eds. (1997). Highlands of many cultures. Tel Aviv: Institute of Archaeology of Tel Aviv University Publications Section. ISBN 965-440-007-3.
- Government of Jordan, Department of Statistics (1964). First Census of Population and Housing. Volume I: Final Tables; General Characteristics of the Population (PDF). Archived (PDF) from the original on 2015-04-03.
- Government of Palestine, Department of Statistics (1945). Village Statistics, April, 1945. Archived from the original on 2019-04-02.
- Guérin, V. (1874). Description Géographique Historique et Archéologique de la Palestine (in French). Vol. 2: Samarie, pt. 1. Paris: L'Imprimerie Nationale.
- Hadawi, S. (1970). Village Statistics of 1945: A Classification of Land and Area ownership in Palestine. Palestine Liberation Organization Research Center. Archived from the original on 2018-12-08.
- Hartmann, M. (1883). "Die Ortschaftenliste des Liwa Jerusalem in dem türkischen Staatskalender für Syrien auf das Jahr 1288 der Flucht (1871)". Zeitschrift des Deutschen Palästina-Vereins. 6: 102–149.
- Hütteroth, W.-D.; Abdulfattah, K. (1977). Historical Geography of Palestine, Transjordan and Southern Syria in the Late 16th Century. Erlanger Geographische Arbeiten, Sonderband 5. Erlangen, Germany: Vorstand der Fränkischen Geographischen Gesellschaft. ISBN 3-920405-41-2. Archived from the original on 2024-10-08.
- Mills, E., ed. (1932). Census of Palestine 1931. Population of Villages, Towns and Administrative Areas. Jerusalem: Government of Palestine.
- Palmer, E.H. (1881). The Survey of Western Palestine: Arabic and English Name Lists Collected During the Survey by Lieutenants Conder and Kitchener, R. E. Transliterated and Explained by E.H. Palmer. Committee of the Palestine Exploration Fund.
- Pringle, D. (1997). Secular buildings in the Crusader Kingdom of Jerusalem: an archaeological Gazetter. Cambridge University Press. ISBN 0521-46010-7.
- Robinson, E.; Smith, E. (1841). Biblical Researches in Palestine, Mount Sinai and Arabia Petraea: A Journal of Travels in the year 1838. Vol. 3. Boston: Crocker & Brewster.
- Röhricht, R. (1887). "Studien zur mittelalterlichen Geographie und Topographie Syriens". Zeitschrift des Deutschen Palästina-Vereins. 10: 195–344.
- Schick, C. (1896). "Zur Einwohnerzahl des Bezirks Jerusalem". Zeitschrift des Deutschen Palästina-Vereins. 19: 120–127.
- Socin, A. (1879). "Alphabetisches Verzeichniss von Ortschaften des Paschalik Jerusalem". Zeitschrift des Deutschen Palästina-Vereins. 2: 135–163.
