= Highway 67 (Israel) =

Highway in northern Israel

Highway 67
- כביש 67
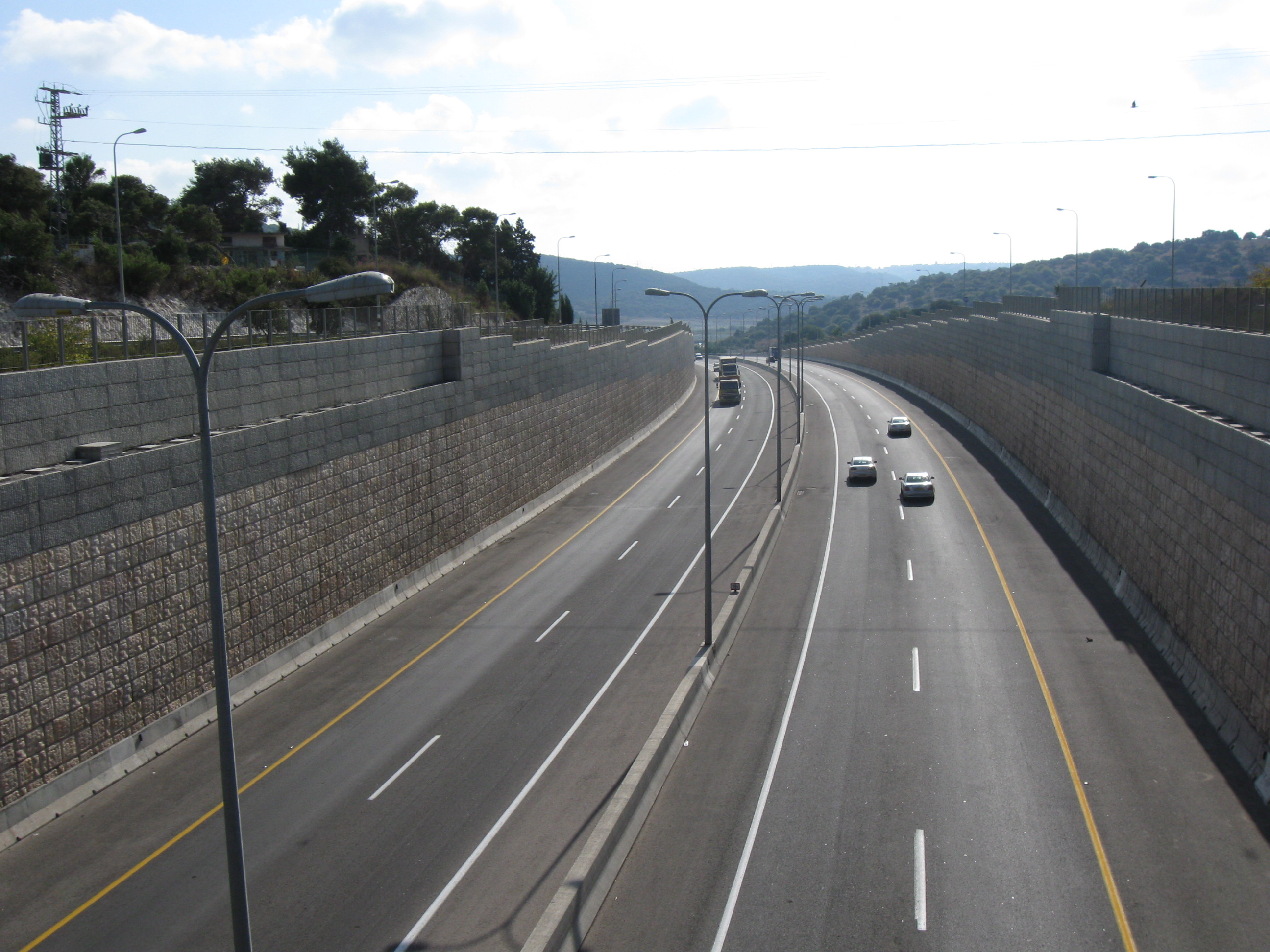

Route information
- Length: 13 km (8.1 mi)
- Existed: 2018–present

Major junctions
- West end: Zikhron Ya'akov Interchange
- East end: Ein Tut Interchange

Location
- Country: Israel

Highway system
- Roads in Israel; Highways
| ← Highway 66 | → Highway 70 |

Highway 67 (Also known as the Wadi Milik road) is a highway in northern Israel and is one of the two main traffic arteries that cross the Carmel while connecting the coastal plain to Highway 6 (the other is Highway 65 also known as the Wadi Ara Road). The length of the road is 13 km (8.1 mi). The road starts at the Zikhron Ya'akov interchange and ends at the Ein Tut interchange at the junction with Highway 6.

== History ==
The road was a section of Highway 70, but with the opening of Highway 6 in the northern section from the Ein Tut interchange in November 2018, the section received an independent road number.

The road existed back in the days of the British Mandate.

In 1935, the section from Zichron Yaakov to Bat Shlomo was paved and in 1938 it was decided to repair it. In 1939, a visitor described it as: "an almost 'virgin' road, set within a framework of dense bushes and reeds that winds and descends into the valley."

In 1937, the possibility of including the road from Zikhron Ya'akov to Yokneam Illit on the Tel Aviv–Haifa road was considered, but in the end, the Atlit road along the coast was chosen. The Peel Commission refused the Jewish demand to include the Wadi Ara road in the Jewish state on the grounds: "There is another convenient road that leaves the Jezreel Valley near Yokneam Illit and passes near Bat Shlomo and Zikhron Ya'akov." In August 1946, Egged began to provide bus service on the road. Along the road were the Jewish settlements of Shfeya, Bat Shlomo and Ein HaEmek, which provided certain security to the local travellers on the route, compared to Route 65) which is considered more dangerous for Jews. During the 1948 Palestine war, until the occupation of Al-Tira, the Jewish traffic moved to Haifa on Highway 67 instead of Highway 4 (the coastal road was paved only after the war). In the 1960s, during the repaving of Highway 65 in Wadi Ara, traffic moved to the Galilee via the Wadi Milik road. At the end of 1967, it was decided to widen the road. In 1968, the western part of the road was closed for construction. Later, a pedestrian bridge was built over the road, in Bat Shlomo.

The southern section from Zikhron Ya'akov to Yokneam and the Sha'ar HaAmakim junction began restoration in July 1972. The road opening was planned for December 1973, but was opened in October 1973 amid the Yom Kippur War and was used by the IDF to transfer troops to the Golan Heights.

At the end of the 90s of the 20th century, Highway 70 was expanded to a two-lane road, from the Fureidis junction to Tamra, and the Bat Shlomo junction and the Elyakim junction were upgraded to interchanges. In 2009, the Tamra section–Yavor junction expanded to two lanes. Section 18 of Highway 6, which opened to traffic on July 20, 2009, connects Highway 65 to Highway 67, at the Ein Tut interchange near the Elyakim interchange. In 2018, the Tel Qashish interchange was inaugurated which separated the numbering of Highway 67 from Highway 70.

In 2014, a bridge was inaugurated over Highway 67 at the eastern entrance to Fureidis, which connects to Route 652.

== Junctions & Interchanges (West to East) ==
| District | Location | km | mi | Name | Destinations | Notes |
|---|---|---|---|---|---|---|
| Haifa | Zikhron Ya'akov | 0 | 0.0 | מחלף זכרון יעקב (Zikhron Ya'akov Interchange) | Highway 2 | |
| Haifa | Fureidis | 2 | 1.2 | צומת פוריידיס (Fureidis Junction) | Highway 4 | |
| Haifa | Meir Shfeya | 4 | 2.5 | צומת שפיה (Shfeya Junction) | Route 652 | |
| Haifa | Bat Shlomo | 8 | 5.0 | מחלף בת שלמה (Zevulon Junction) | Entrance to Bat Shlomo | |
| Northern | Ramot Menashe | 13 | 8.1 | מחלף עין תות (Ein Tut Interchange) | Highway 6 | Named after nearby Nahal Tut |
1.000 mi = 1.609 km; 1.000 km = 0.621 mi

== See also ==
- List of highways in Israel
