= Highway 31 (Israel) =

Highway in Israel

Coordinates: 31°15′55″N 35°01′29″E

Highway 31
- כביש 31
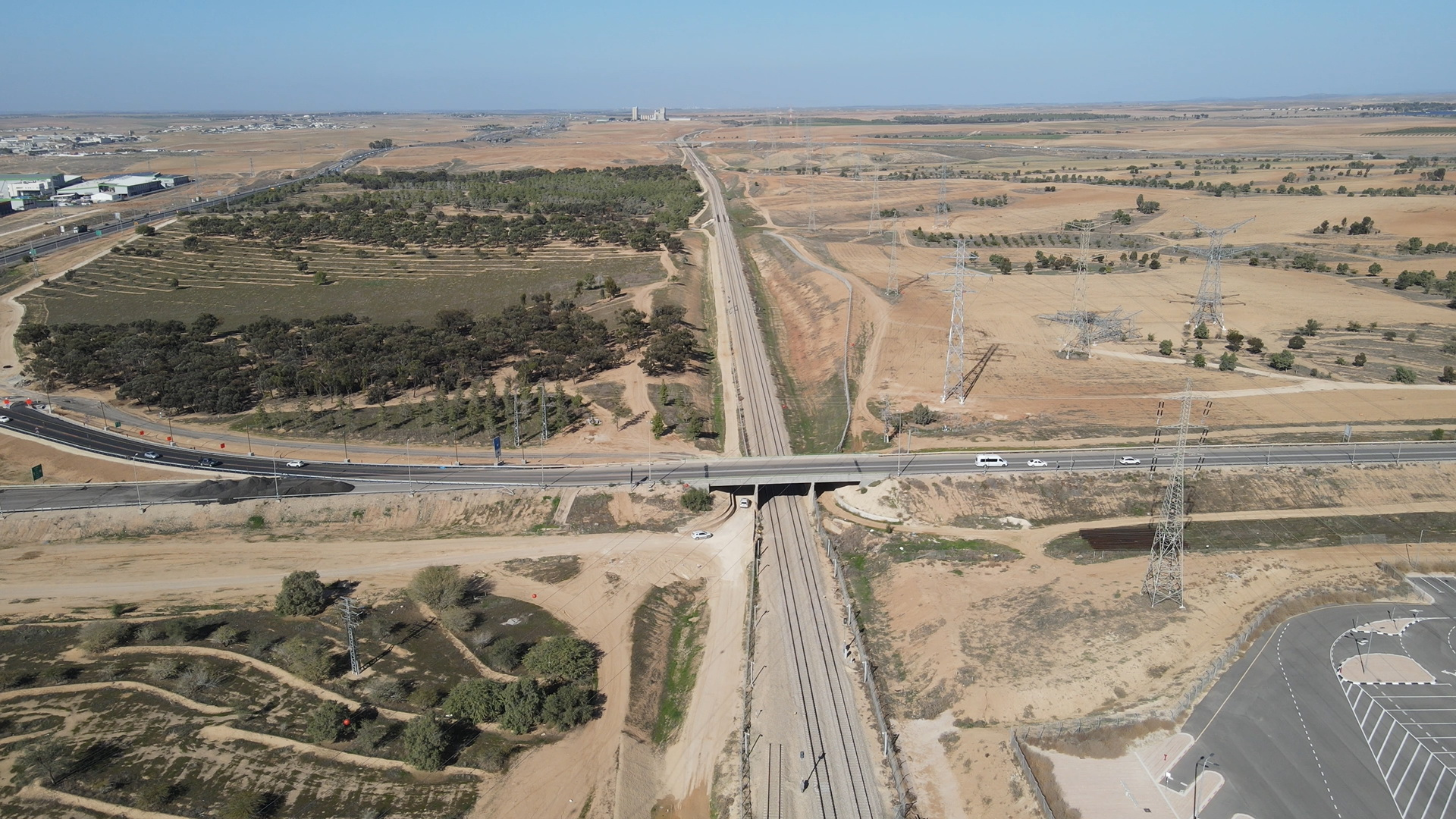
- A bridge of Highway 31 over the Railway to Beersheba near the Lehavim–Rahat railway station, December 2020

Route information
- Length: 60.5 km (37.6 mi)
- Existed: 1963–present

Major junctions
- West end: Lakiya Interchange
- East end: Zohar Junction

Location
- Country: Israel

Highway system
- Roads in Israel; Highways
← Highway 25	→ Highway 34

Highway 31 is an inter-city highway in southern Israel. It begins at Lakiya Interchange with Highway 6 at Lakiya. It passes through Hura, Kuseife, Arad, and it terminates at Zohar Junction with Highway 90 south of Neve Zohar just west of the Dead Sea.

== History ==
The initial plan for road construction was formulated in the mid-1950s.

In July 1961, the construction of the western section of the road between Lahavim and Arad began. The start of the work was marked in a ceremony in the presence of Pinchas Sapir. The groundwork on the road continued until May 1962 and then the laying of infrastructure began. In the second half of 1962, the tarring was carried out and the road was inaugurated in February 1963. During the inauguration, the road was named after Gershon Dubinbaum, a Palmach member who was killed in the area. The demolition work on the eastern section of the road, from Arad to the Dead Sea, also began in July 1961, but due to the steep route of the road, they took longer, and required quarrying and blowing up rocks. This section of the road was inaugurated in June 1964, after three years of work.

The road included one lane in each direction, and during 2010–2012, 30 people were killed in traffic accidents. The section between Arad and Sodom was a dangerous road descending to the Dead Sea region in sharp turns until it was upgraded in 2014. This section is loved by bikers, some of whom have died on it. South of the road is a cluster of several memorials to bikers who were killed on the so-called "Death Road." In 2010, the National Roads Company of Israel began a project to widen the road to two lanes in both lanes in the Shoket - Arad section. The project includes the construction of a wide and protective traffic island between the tracks, as well as the construction of interchanges in place of the existing intersections. Most of the interchanges were opened in 2015. As part of the works, intensive treatment was carried out to develop scenery and landscaping on the roadside, sidewalks were erected, and lighting was installed along the entire section length. In addition, a bicycle path was paved, and safety rails were placed for vehicles and pedestrians. At the entrance to the city of Arad, a traffic light was placed to regulate traffic between Highway 31 and Shamir and Kan'im streets.

On February 3, 2015, an accident occurred between a truck carrying a tractor and a bus near the Lehavim intersection. 8 residents of Hura and the surrounding area were killed and dozens were injured.

In the past, the road continued west until the HaNasi Junction. Today, the section of the road from HaNasi Junction to Lehavim Junction is marked as Route 310. Highway 6 was paved using the existing route of Highway 31 from Lehavim to Lakiya Interchange, and today, this section is marked as Highway 6 only. The section was opened in 2015. Highway 6 continues south and connects to the upgraded road to Arad at the Shoket Interchange.

== Junctions & Interchanges (West to East) ==
District	Location	km	mi	Name	Destinations	Notes
Southern	Lakiya	0	0.0	מחלף לקייה (Lakiya Interchange)	Highway 6 Route 358	
Southern	Lakiya	2	1.2	צומת לקייה (Lakiya Junction)	Entrance to Lakiya	
Southern	Tel Shoket	3.5	2.2	מחלף שוקת (Shoket Interchange)	Highway 6	
Southern	Meitar	5	3.1	מחלף מיתר (Meitar Interchange)	Highway 60	
Southern	Hura	8	5.0	מחלף חורה (Hura Interchange)	Entrance to Hura	
Southern	Hura	10	6.2	מחלף יתיר (Yatir Interchange)	Route 316	
Southern	Mulada	13.5	8.4	מחלף מולדה (Mulada Interchange)	Entrance to Mulada	
Southern	Nasasra	20	12	מחלפון נבטים (Nevatim Interchange)	Entrance to Nasasra	
Southern	Kuseife	22.5	14.0	מחלף כסייפה (Kuseife Interchange)	Road 3112; Entrance to Kuseife	
Southern	Tel Arad	28.5	17.7	צומת תל ערד (Tel Arad Junction)	Highway 80	
Southern	Arad	32	20	מחלף פארק ערד (Arad Park Interchange)	Entrance to Arad Park	
Southern	Arad	37	23	צומת ערד (Arad Junction)	Road 3199	
Southern	Hatrurim Formation	54	34	צומת חתרורים (Hatrurim Junction)	Route 258	
Southern	Neve Zohar	60.5	37.6	צומת זוהר (Zohar Junction)	Highway 90	
1.000 mi = 1.609 km; 1.000 km = 0.621 mi

== Gallery ==
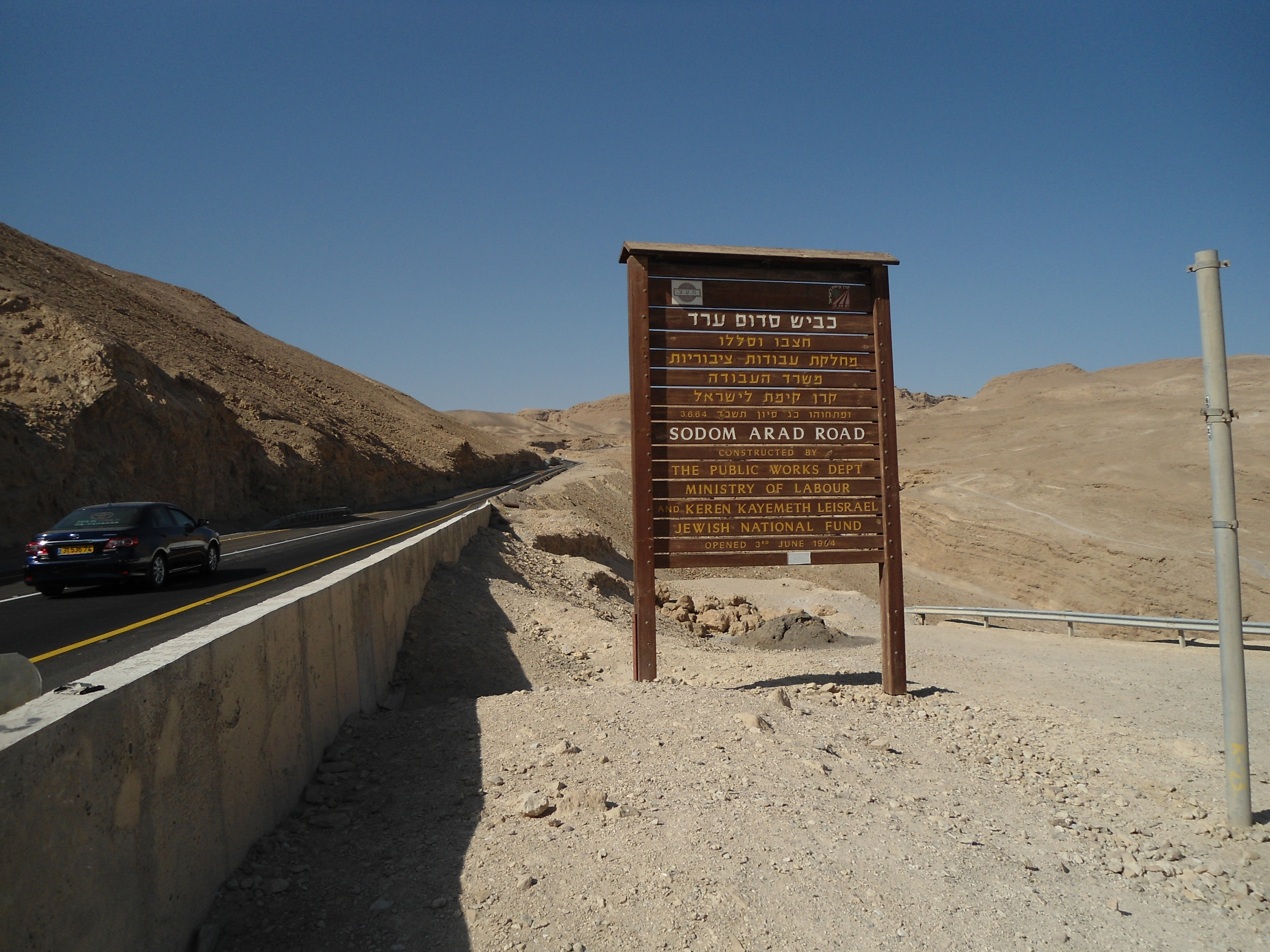
Information sign near the junction with Highway 90

== Hazardous road ==
Road 31, nicknamed road of death had been declared a red road (a road that has more than average number of fatal accidents) by both Or Yarok and the Israeli police. The road had an average of 2 fatal accidents per month between 2011 and 2013, and had a total of 87 dead and 1399 wounded up until 2015.

== See also ==
- List of highways in Israel
