= Nahal Tut (archaeological site) =

Coordinates: 32.623328°N 35.059841°E

Nahal Tut (Hebrew: נחל תות, also Nachal Toot) is an archaeological site excavated along the streambed of the same name in northern Israel's Menashe Heights from February to July 2005 by Amir Gorzalczany and Gerald Finkielsztejn in preparation for the northward extension of Highway 6. Trig Point N-568 is situated south of Nahal Melah highway (Hwy 70) about halfway between modern Bat Shlomo and Yokneam.

The salvage operation exposed habitation layers of the following periods:

- Mamluk (Stratum I)
- Roman (Stratum II)
- Iron Age (Strata III-VI)

The most significant finds reported thus far:

- Large building with a courtyard (20 x 35 m) enclosed by thick walls
- Ritual bath (mikveh) within the courtyard
- Numerous pottery vessels, especially jars with LMLK seal impressions (type H2x and Z2x)
- Hebrew signet seal on a precious stone about 1.5 x 1.0 cm, adorned with 4 pomegranates and the inscription, "LMKAH Amihai" (of Makah [son of] Amihai)

The buildings were found relatively intact (upright walls with doorways and window lintels still in-situ).

Gorzalczany, of the Israel Antiquities Authority, speculates that "the site probably functioned as an administrative and government center at the end of the 8th century BCE, and may have been fortified."

Nahal Tut joins 3 other northern sites where LMLK handles have been recovered (Nahalal, Khirbet Sharta, and Jezreel). Speculation is abounding with possible reasons for their appearance in this isolated region apart from the vast majority found in the southern kingdom of Judah:

- Pilgrimages to Jerusalem in response to King Hezekiah's inauguration Passover feast
- Fortification of a northwestern outpost by King Hezekiah in preparation for an Assyrian attack
- Trash deposited by Sennacherib's army following their victorious campaign at Lachish

Arguments for/against each of these proposals have been suggested on Internet discussion lists.
