= Jimzu =

Jimzu جمزو Gimzo
- Etymology: Sycamore
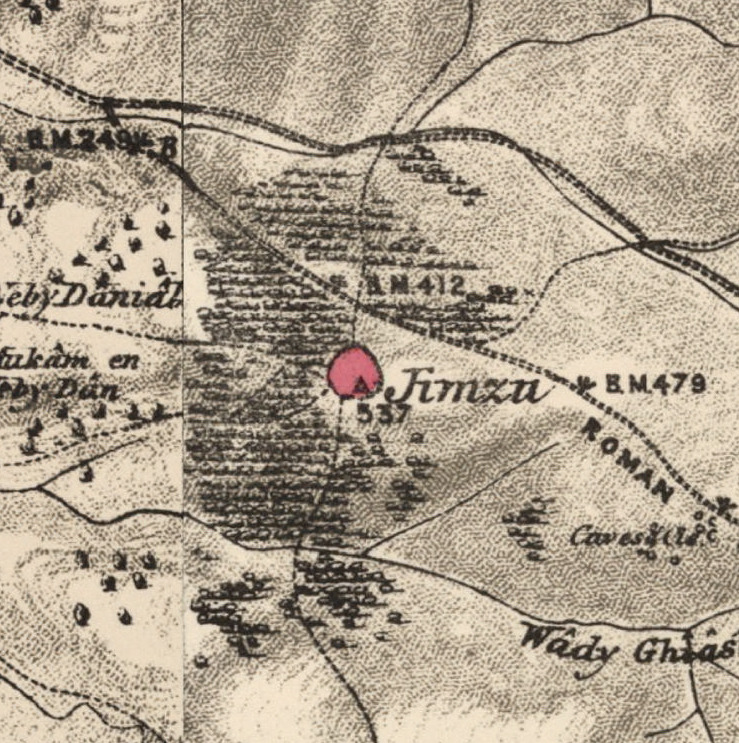
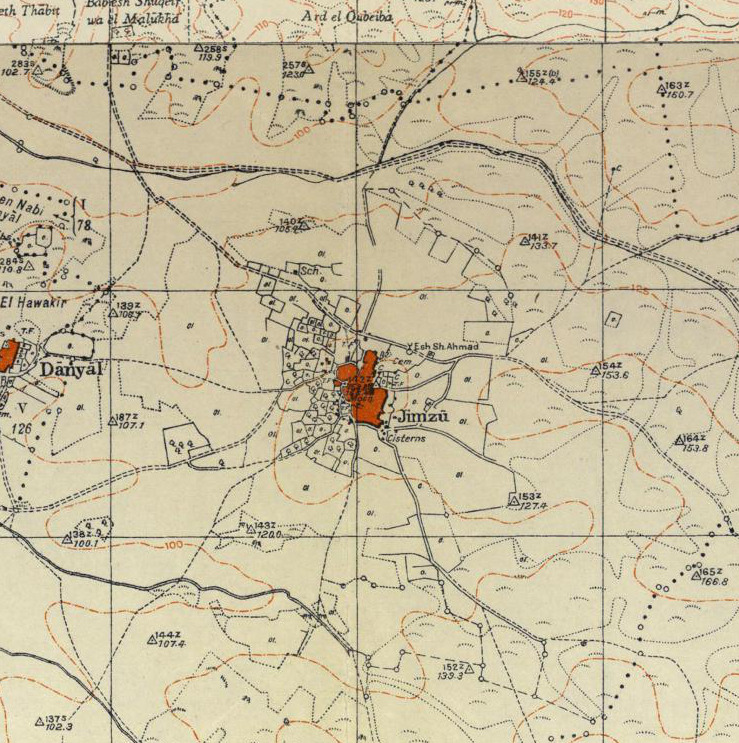
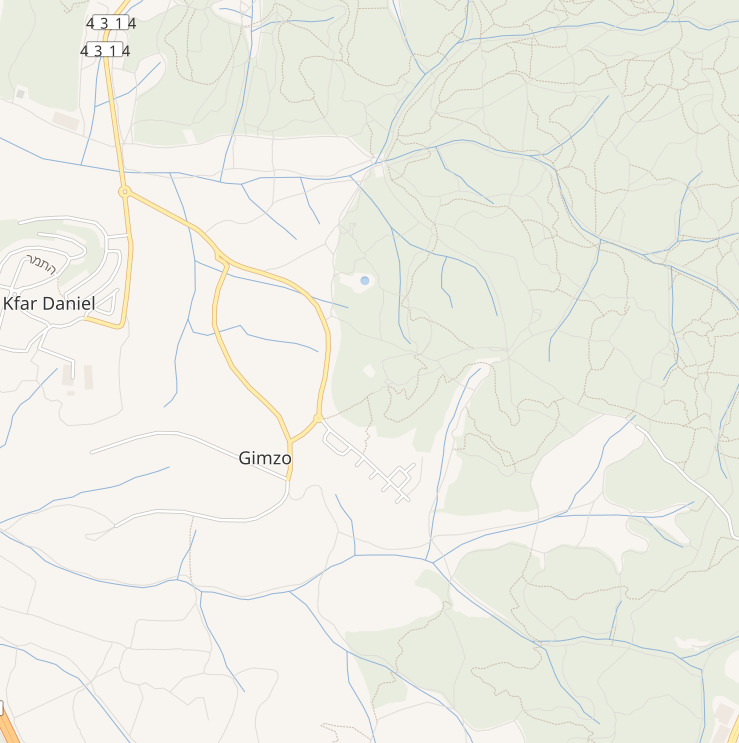
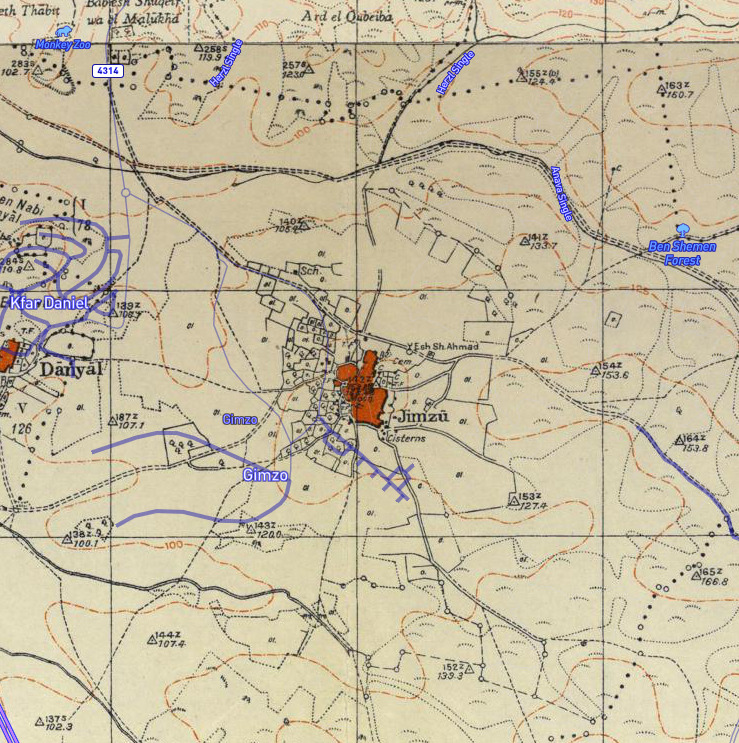
- 1870s map 1940s map modern map 1940s with modern overlay map A series of historical maps of the area around Jimzu (click the buttons)

- Location within Mandatory Palestine
- Coordinates: 31°55′51″N 34°56′47″E
- Palestine grid: 145/148
- Geopolitical entity: Mandatory Palestine
- Subdistrict: Ramle
- Date of depopulation: 10 July 1948

Area
  - Total: 9,681 dunams (9.681 km^{2}; 3.738 sq mi)

Population (1945)
  - Total: 1,510
- Cause(s) of depopulation: Military assault by Yishuv forces
- Current Localities: Moshav Gimzo

Jimzu (Arabic: جمزو), also known as Gimzo (meaning "sycamore plantation"), was a Palestinian village, located three miles southeast of Lydda. Under the 1947 UN Partition Plan of Mandatory Palestine, Jimzu was to form part of the proposed Arab state. During the 1948 Arab–Israeli War, the village was depopulated in a two-day assault by Israeli forces.

Under the 1949 Armistice Agreements, Jimzu's lands fell under the de facto governance of the newly created state of Israel. A year later, moshav Gimzo was established at the site of the former village and is now populated by 700 Israeli Jewish residents.

== History ==
Jimzu is identified with the ancient Gimzo, a city mentioned in the Bible as being in the plain of Judah whose villages were seized by the Philistines (as recorded in the 2 Chronicles 28:18). The town was home to the Tannaic sage Nahum of Gimzo.

=== Ottoman era ===
Jimzu, along with the whole of Palestine, came under the rule of the Ottoman Empire after it defeated the Mamluks at the Battle of Marj Dabiq in 1516. The village was incorporated into the Ottoman nahiya (subdistrict) of Ramla (al-Khalīl) under the Liwa of Gaza ("District of Gaza"). In the 1596 tax records, it is recorded that the village of Jimzu had 28 families, all Muslim; an estimated population of 154. They paid a tax rate of 25% on agricultural products, including wheat, barley and fruits, as well as goats and beehives, in addition to "occasional revenues"; a total of 6,990 Akçe.

Biblical scholar Edward Robinson passed through the village in 1838, and reported it to be "rather large", situated on an eminence, "to make quite a show at a distance". He also noted that the village had many subterranean magazines for storing grain. It was noted as being situated in the Ramleh district.

In 1863 Victor Guérin found the village have 400 inhabitants, and to be surrounded by olive and palm trees. The village also had a Makam for a Sidi Ahmed. Each family had its own silo.

An Ottoman village list of about 1870 counted 83 houses and a population of 325 in Dschimzu, though the population count included men, only.

In 1882, the PEF's Survey of Western Palestine (SWP) described Jimzu as a village built of adobe bricks and situated on the side of a low hill, surrounded by cactus hedges and olive trees.

=== British Mandate era ===
In the 1922 census of Palestine, conducted by the British Mandate authorities, Jemzu had a population of 897 inhabitants, all Muslims, increasing in the 1931 census to 1,081, still all Muslims, in a total of 268 houses.

The villagers of Jimzu maintained a mosque. An elementary school was established in the village in 1920, and by the mid-1940s it had 175 students.

Most villagers worked in agriculture. In the 1945 statistics, the population was 1,510, all Muslims, while the total land area was 9,681 dunams, according to an official land and population survey. Of this, a total of 77 dunums was devoted to citrus and bananas, while 5,577 dunums were allocated to cereals. 1,605 dunums were irrigated or used for orchards, of which 1,400 dunums was for olives, while 50 dunams were classified as built-up public areas.

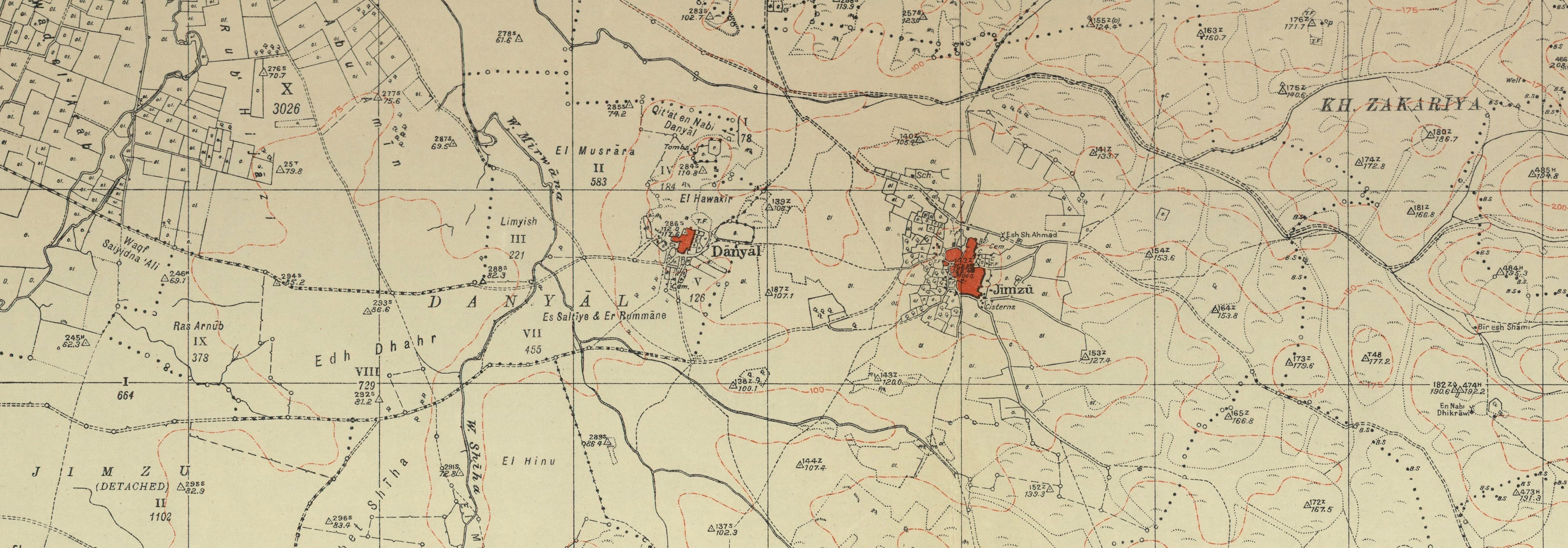
Jimzu 1942 1:20,000

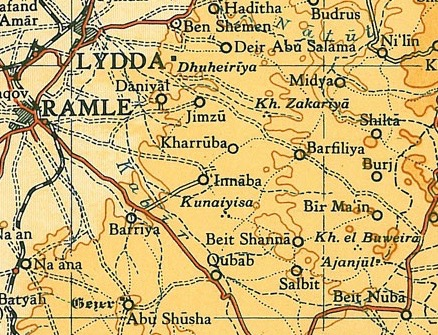
Jimzu 1945 1:250,000

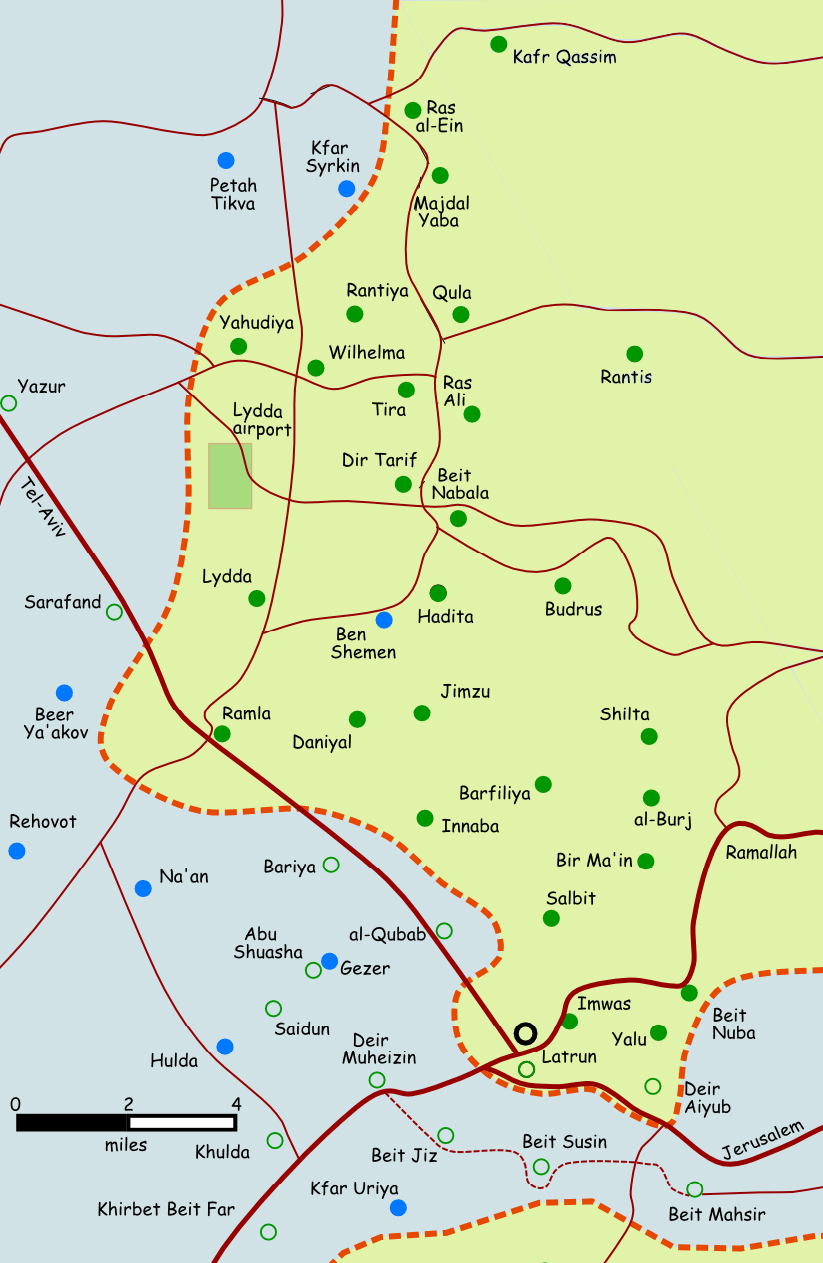
Palestinian villages depopulated in the area around Lydda and Ramla (coloured in green)

=== 1948 war ===
Jizmu was occupied by the Yiftach Brigade, of the newly formed Israeli army, on July 10, 1948, in the first phase of Operation Dani.

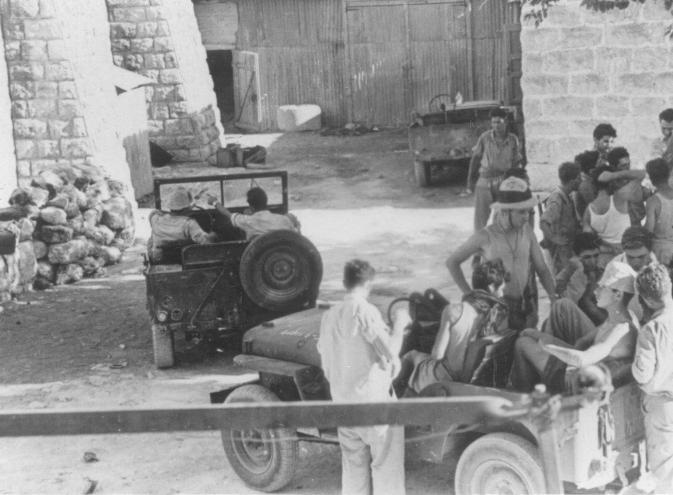
Yiftach Brigade after the capture of Jimuz during Operation Dani

According to Benny Morris:

"The intention, from the first, was to depopulate [Jimzu and surrounding villages]. On 10 July, Yiftah Brigade HQ informed Dani HQ: Our forces are clearing the 'Innaba-Jimzu-Daniyal area and are torching everything that can be burned.'"

The following day (11 July) Yiftach informed Dani Headquarters, that its forces had conquered Jimzu and Daniyal and were "busy clearing the villages and blowing up the houses ['oskot betihur hakfarim u'fitzutz habatim]" All of Jimzu's inhabitants left as a result of the assault by Israeli forces. Its 434 homes were demolished on September 13, 1948.

The settlement of Gimzo was established on village land in 1950. Palestinian historian Walid Khalidi described the remains of Jimzu in 1992: "All that remains of the houses are stones, strewn over the site, and some crumbled walls. The site is overgrown with shrubs and thorny plants. Other kind of vegetation also grow on village land, including Christ's-thorn trees, foxtail, cactuses, and some abandoned olive trees."

== See also ==
- Depopulated Palestinian locations in Israel
- List of villages depopulated during the Arab-Israeli conflict

== Bibliography ==
- Barron, J. B., ed. (1923). Palestine: Report and General Abstracts of the Census of 1922. Government of Palestine.
- Conder, C.R.; Kitchener, H.H. (1882). The Survey of Western Palestine: Memoirs of the Topography, Orography, Hydrography, and Archaeology. Vol. 2. London: Committee of the Palestine Exploration Fund.
- Dauphin, C. (1998). La Palestine byzantine, Peuplement et Populations. BAR International Series 726 (in French). Vol. III : Catalogue. Oxford: Archeopress. ISBN 0-860549-05-4. p.834
- Department of Statistics (1945). Village Statistics, April, 1945. Government of Palestine.
- Guérin, V. (1868). Description Géographique Historique et Archéologique de la Palestine (in French). Vol. 1: Judee, pt. 1. Paris: L'Imprimerie Nationale.
- Hadawi, S. (1970). Village Statistics of 1945: A Classification of Land and Area ownership in Palestine. Palestine Liberation Organization Research Center.
- Hartmann, M. (1883). "Die Ortschaftenliste des Liwa Jerusalem in dem türkischen Staatskalender für Syrien auf das Jahr 1288 der Flucht (1871)". Zeitschrift des Deutschen Palästina-Vereins. 6: 102–149.
- Hütteroth, W.-D.; Abdulfattah, K. (1977). Historical Geography of Palestine, Transjordan and Southern Syria in the Late 16th Century. Erlanger Geographische Arbeiten, Sonderband 5. Erlangen, Germany: Vorstand der Fränkischen Geographischen Gesellschaft. ISBN 3-920405-41-2.
- Khalidi, W. (1992). All That Remains: The Palestinian Villages Occupied and Depopulated by Israel in 1948. Washington D.C.: Institute for Palestine Studies. ISBN 0-88728-224-5.
- Mills, E., ed. (1932). Census of Palestine 1931. Population of Villages, Towns and Administrative Areas. Jerusalem: Government of Palestine.
- Morris, B. (2004). The Birth of the Palestinian Refugee Problem Revisited. Cambridge University Press. ISBN 978-0-521-00967-6.
- Palmer, E. H. (1881). The Survey of Western Palestine: Arabic and English Name Lists Collected During the Survey by Lieutenants Conder and Kitchener, R. E. Transliterated and Explained by E.H. Palmer. Committee of the Palestine Exploration Fund.
- Robinson, E.; Smith, E. (1841). Biblical Researches in Palestine, Mount Sinai and Arabia Petraea: A Journal of Travels in the year 1838. Vol. 3. Boston: Crocker & Brewster.
- Socin, A. (1879). "Alphabetisches Verzeichniss von Ortschaften des Paschalik Jerusalem". Zeitschrift des Deutschen Palästina-Vereins. 2: 135–163.
