= Speed limits in Israel =

Speed limits in Israel

The default speed limits in Israel are:

- 50 km/h on urban roads;
- 80 km/h on non-urban roads;
- 90 km/h on non-urban roads with a built-up dividing area;
- 100 km/h on Route 1, the highway between Tel Aviv and Jerusalem;
- 110 km/h on a small number of high-speed roads; and
- 120 km/h on Highway 6, the north–south toll road.
