= Gimzo =

Moshav in central Israel

Gimzo: גִּמְזוֹ (Hebrew)
- Location within Central Israel Location within Israel
- Coordinates: 31°55′31″N 34°56′30″E
- Country: Israel
- District: Central
- Subdistrict: Ramla
- Council: Hevel Modi'in
- Affiliation: Poalei Agudat Yisrael
- Founded: 28 February 1950
- Founder: Hungarian Jews
- Population (2024): 1,150
- Website: www.gimzo.org.il

Gimzo (Hebrew: גִּמְזוֹ) is a religious moshav in central Israel. Located between Lod and Modi'in, it falls under the jurisdiction of Hevel Modi'in Regional Council. In 2024 it had a population of 1,150.

== Geography ==
The moshav is on the outskirts of the Ben Shemen Forest, on the major crossroad of Route 1 and Route 443, major arteries leading to Jerusalem, about six kilometers south-east of Lod, in the western plains at the foot of the Judean Mountains.

== History ==
Gimzo was first mentioned in the Bible in the approximate period of 740 BC, when the Philistines conquered the area from the hands of King Ahaz of Israel. It is reported that "the Philistines also had invaded the cities of the lowland and of the Negev of Judah, and had taken Beit Shemesh, Ayalon, Gederoth, and Sokho with its villages, Timnah with its villages, and Gimzo with its villages, and they settled there".

The name Gimzo is thought to derive from the fruit of the sycamore tree known as "Gomez" which was abundant in this area, based on the biblical verse: "The king made silver and gold as plentiful in Jerusalem as stones, and he made cedars as plentiful as sycamores in the lowland." In the Talmudic period, Rabbi Shimon ben Gamliel says: "A sign of mountains is "milin", a sign of valleys is palm trees, a sign of rivers is cane, and a sign of the plains is Sycamore trees, and whereas there is no proof of this, we remember the words: And he made cedars as plentiful as sycamores in the lowland". Moshav Gimzo was the home of the sage Nachum Ish Gamzu, who was wont to say "It is all for the best" which translates to "Gam-zo le-tova", a word play on the name of his home at "Gam-zo".

In 1917, the British, under the command of General Edmund Allenby, took control of Palestine. The Palestinian village of Jimzu was cited as the rendezvous point for the British 52nd division, for its advance to Jerusalem through the Beit Horon Pass.

During the 1948 Arab–Israeli War, "Operation Dani" was planned to occupy Lod, Ramla, Latrun, and Ramallah, and to release the pressure around Jerusalem. Plans for this operation mention Jimzu, and on 10 July 1948, the Yiftah Brigade captured the settlements of Anabe, Jimzu, Daniyal and Dahariya. Jimzu was depopulated, and its inhabitants became refugees.

The moshav was founded by a group of immigrants from Hungary on 28 February 1950. The founders were a group of Satmar Chassidim called Etz Chaim ("tree of life"), affiliated with the Poalei Agudat Yisrael party.

In 1951 the Israeli government settled a group of immigrants from Morocco in the moshav to enlarge the population. In 1977, a new group of 12 young families settled there as well.

The moshav has grown substantially, having absorbed new families, and has built a new neighborhood with housing for Gimzo's newer generation. Today the moshav consists of 140 families with over 700 residents, including ultra-orthodox and orthodox Jewish residents of both Sephardic and Ashkenazi backgrounds who lead a "religious-Zionist lifestyle".

== Economics ==
The moshav consists of 71 agricultural tracts.
