= Highway 70 (Israel) =

Highway in northern Israel

Coordinates: 32°45′34″N 35°05′03″E

Highway 70
- כביש 70
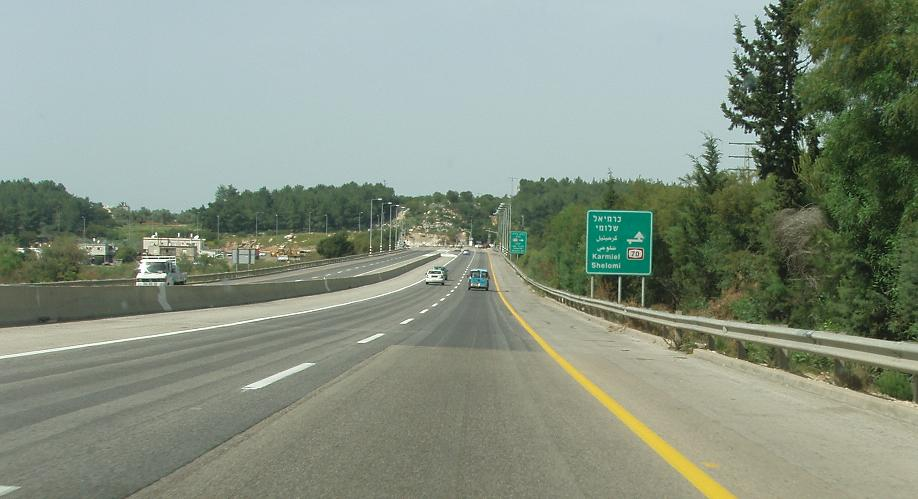
- Highway 70 near the Somekh junction, before being upgraded to an interchange.

Route information
- Length: 44 km (27 mi)

Major junctions
- South end: Yagur Interchange
- North end: Hanita Junction

Location
- Country: Israel

Highway system
- Roads in Israel; Highways
← Highway 67	→ Highway 71

Highway 70 is a highway, 44 km in length, running through the Western Galilee region in the Northern District of Israel. It connects the Lower Galilee to Kiryat Ata and Shlomi near Israel's border with Lebanon.

The highway runs concurrently with Highway 75 for 4 km between Ha'Amakim Interchange and Yagur Junction, then with Highway 6 for 5 km between Givot Alonim Interchange and Somekh Interchange.

== Overview ==
Highway 70 begins at the Yagur interchange with Highway 75, then goes north toward Kiryat Ata and Shefaram and afterward continues through the Western Galilee until Shlomi.

At the end of the 1990s, the two junctions near the southern end of the road, at Bat Shlomo and Elyakim, were reconstructed into interchanges to enable uninterrupted travel from Shefaya junction to Yokneam junction.

== Junctions & Interchanges (South to North) ==
District	Location	km	mi	Name	Destinations	Notes
Haifa	Yagur	0	0.0	מחלף יגור (Yagur Interchange)	Highway 75; Route 752	
Haifa	Rekhasim	1.4	0.87	צומת דשנים (Deshanim Junction)	Route 772	
Haifa	Rekhasim	2.4	1.5	צומת חסידים (Hasidim Junction)	Route 762	
Haifa	Kiryat Ata	3.9	2.4	צומת זבולון (Zevulon Junction)	Route 780	
Haifa	Khawaled	6	3.7	מחלף גבעות אלונים (Givot Alonim Interchange)	Highway 6	
Haifa	Kiryat Ata	11	6.8	מחלף סומך (Somekh Interchange)	Highway 6 Highway 79	
Northern	Shfar'am	13	8.1	צומת אבליים (Avlayim Junction)	Route 781	
Northern	Tamra	16	9.9	צומת טמרה (Tamra Junction)	Entrance to Tamra	
Northern	Kabul	19	12	צומת כאבול (Kabul Junction)	Entrance to Kabul	
Northern	Yasur	21	13	צומת יבור (Yavor Junction)	Route 805	
Northern	Ahihud	23.8	14.8	צומת אחיהוד (Ahihud Junction)	Highway 85	Eastern end of concurrency with Highway 85
Northern	Jadeidi-Makr	24.3	15.1	צומת יאסיף (Yassif Junction)	Highway 85	Western end of concurrency with Highway 85
Northern	Jadeidi-Makr	25.4	15.8		Entrance to Jadeidi-Makr	
Northern	Tal El	26	16	צומת טל-אל (Tal El Junction)	Entrance to Tal El	
Northern	Julis	27	17	צומת ג'וליס (Julis Junction)	Entrance to Julis	
Northern	Kfar Yassif	29	18		Entrance to Kfar Yassif	
Northern	Beit HaEmek	30.5	19.0		Entrance to Beit HaEmek	
Northern	Oshrat	31	19	צומת אשרת (Oshrat Junction)	Entrance to Oshrat	
Northern	Amka	32	20	צומת עמקה (Amka Junction)	Route 859	
Northern	Sheikh Danun	33	21	צומת כליל (Klil Junction)	Road 8721	
Northern	Netiv HaShayara	34.5	21.4	צומת השיירה (HaShayara Junction)	Entrance to Netiv HaShayara	
Northern	Kabri	37	23	צומת כברי (Kabri Junction)	Highway 89	
Northern	Avdon; Manot	40	25	צומת עבדון (Avdon Junction)	Road 8911	
Northern	Matzuva	43	27	צומת מצובה (Matzuva Junction)	Entrance to Matzuva	
Northern	Shlomi	44	27	צומת חניתה (Hanita Junction)	Route 899	
1.000 mi = 1.609 km; 1.000 km = 0.621 mi: Concurrency terminus

== See also ==
- List of highways in Israel
