= Kfar Daniel =

Moshav in central Israel

Kfar Daniel: כְּפַר דָּנִיֵּאל (Hebrew)
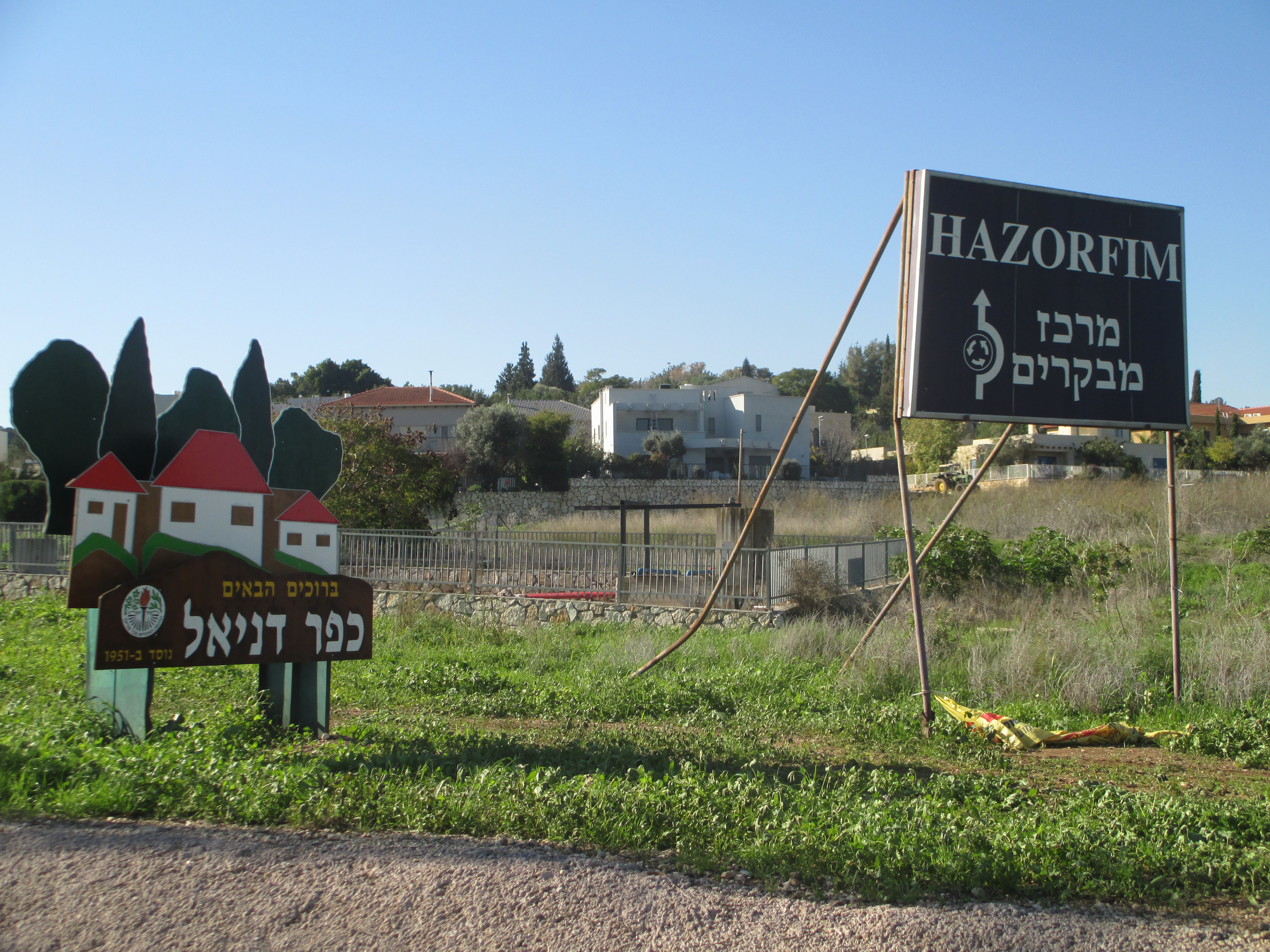

- Location within Central Israel
- Coordinates: 31°55′59″N 34°56′2″E
- Country: Israel
- District: Central
- Subdistrict: Ramla
- Council: Hevel Modi'in
- Affiliation: Kibbutz Movement
- Founded: 9 October 1949
- Founder: Mahalniks
- Population (2024): 614

Kfar Daniel (Hebrew: כְּפַר דָּנִיֵּאל, lit. 'Daniel Village') is a moshav shitufi in central Israel. Located around four kilometres south-east of Lod and covering 2,900 dunams, it falls under the jurisdiction of Hevel Modi'in Regional Council. In 2024 it had a population of 614.

== History ==
During the Ottoman period, the area belonged to the Nahiyeh (sub-district) of Lod that encompassed the area of the present-day city of Modi'in-Maccabim-Re'ut in the south to the present-day city of El'ad in the north, and from the foothills in the east, through the Lod Valley to the outskirts of Jaffa in the west. This area was home to thousands of inhabitants in about 20 villages, who had at their disposal tens of thousands of hectares of prime agricultural land.

The village was established on 9 October 1949 by Mahalniks (overseas volunteers in the War of Independence) from English-speaking countries on land near the depopulated Palestinian village of Daniyal. It was initially called Irgun Beit Hever after the organisation which the founders were members of, but was later renamed in honour of Daniel Frish, a president of the Zionist Organization of America who died in the year the village was established, with the new name resembling that of the former Arab village.

During a Houthi missile attack on 15 September 2024 amid the Gaza war, missile fragments fell into an open area located in the village.

== Economy ==
Hazorfim, a manufacturer of Judaica and silverware is located in Kfar Daniel.The moshav also runs a monkey park with 250 species of monkeys.

== Transportation ==
There is a highway interchange connecting Highway 1 and Highway 6, called the Daniel Interchange, which is named after the village.
