= Highway 6 (Israel) =

Highway in Israel

Highway 6
- כביש 6
- Trans Israel Highway; Hebrew: כביש חוצה ישראל, romanized: Kvish Ḥotze Yisra'el; Yitzhak Rabin Highway; Hebrew: כביש יצחק רבין, romanized: Kvish Yitzḥak Rabin
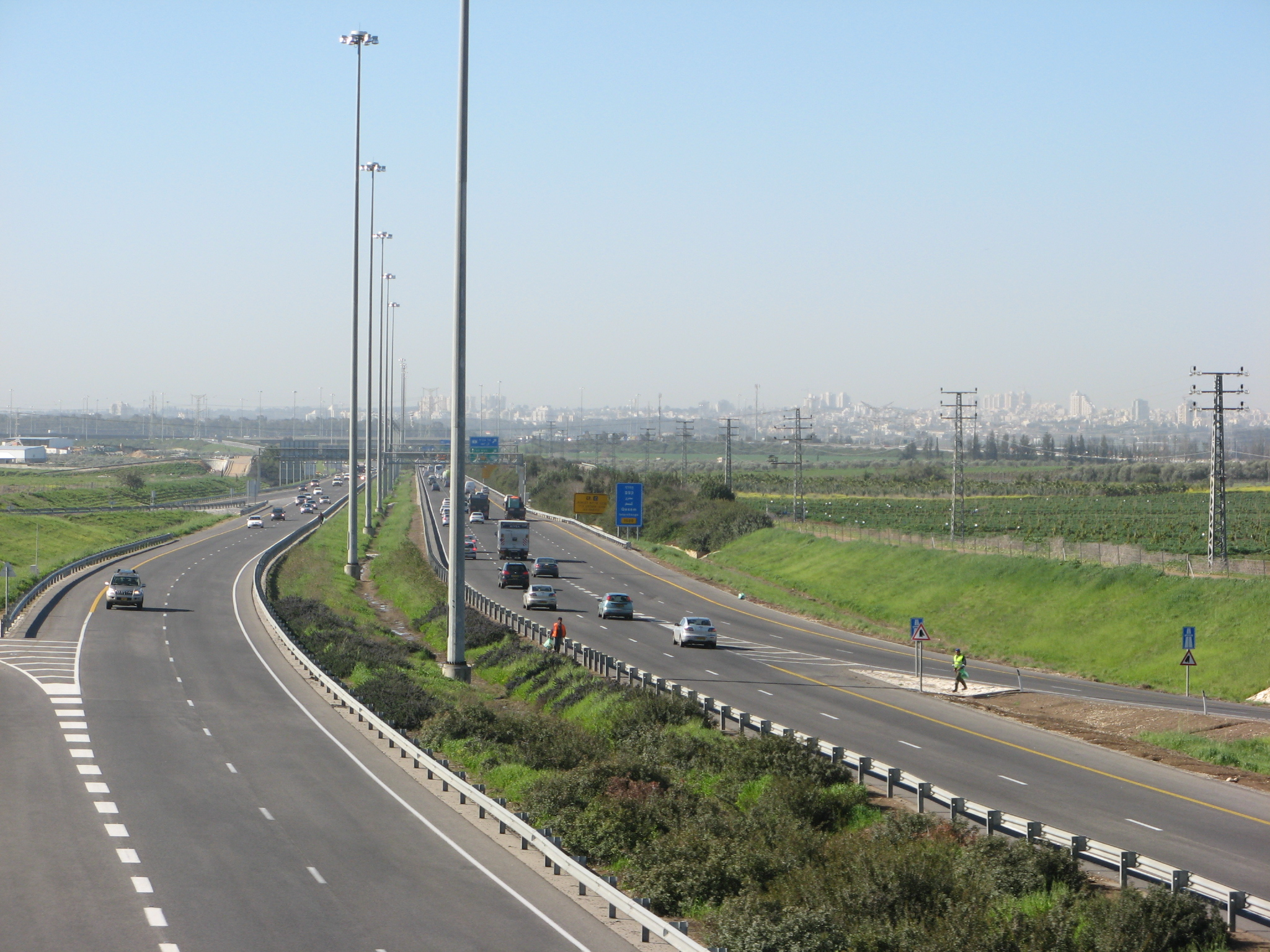
- Highway near Horshim Interchange

Route information
- Length: 204 km (127 mi)

Major junctions
- South end: Shoket Interchange
- Sorek Interchange; Nesharim Interchange; Ben Shemen Interchange; Kessem Interchange; Iron Interchange
- North end: Somekh Interchange

Location
- Country: Israel
- Major cities: Beersheba, Kiryat Gat, Ramla, Petah Tikva, Rosh HaAyin, Pardes Hanna-Karkur, Hadera, Yokneam Illit, Shefa-Amr

Highway system
- Roads in Israel; Highways
← Highway 5	→ Highway 7

Highway 6 (Hebrew: כביש 6, Kvish Shesh), also known as the Trans-Israel Highway or Cross-Israel Highway (Hebrew: כביש חוצה ישראל, Kvish Ḥotzeh Yisra'el) (or Yitzhak Rabin Highway (Hebrew: כביש יצחק רבין, Kvish Yitzḥak Rabin) for most of its length), is a major electronic toll highway in Israel. Highway 6 is the first Israeli Build-Operate-Transfer road constructed, carried out mainly by the private sector in return for a concession to collect tolls on the highway for a given number of years. It is also one of the largest infrastructure projects undertaken in Israel.

== History ==
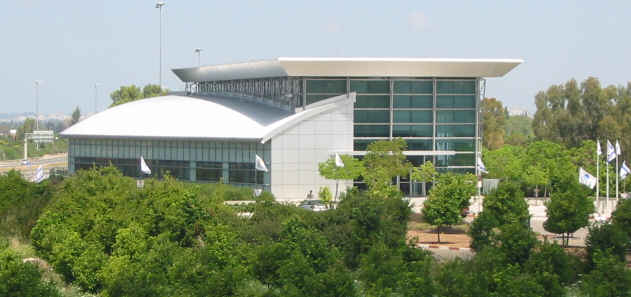
Headquarters and control centre near Rosh HaAyin

The highway is officially dedicated the Yitzhak Rabin Highway (Hebrew: כביש יצחק רבין, Kvish Yitzḥak Rabin), though this name is not commonly used. It began operating in 2002 and continues to be lengthened as construction proceeds on newer sections. The southern terminus is at Shoket Interchange, opened in November 2016. The northern terminus is the Tel Kashish Interchange, opened on November 14, 2018, where the highway now merges into Highway 70 heading northwest. Another northern extension to Somech Interchange opened in 2019.

In July 2025, Transportation Minister Miri Regev announced a NIS 5 billion ($1.48 billion) plan to construct 48 kilometers (30 miles) of elevated highway above the existing road's most congested sections. A 16-kilometer section would run between the Nahshonim Interchange and the Eyal Interchange, while in the south, 32 kilometers of new highway would rise above the existing road between the Baqa-Jatt Interchange and the Horshim Interchange.

== Goals ==
The highway aims to provide an efficient north–south transportation corridor in Israel while allowing drivers to bypass the traffic-congested Tel Aviv region in the country's center. Thus, it is the easternmost major highway in Israel, in some places located almost right on the Green Line. Currently, it is 204 km long, all of which is a controlled-access highway. This figure will grow in the next few years as additional segments are extended northward and southward from the existing section of the road. As of 2013, some parts were under construction while others were undergoing statutory approvals and permitting processes.

== Characteristics and pricing ==
The Israeli toll road symbol featuring the Sheqel symbol from the Israeli new sheqel

Highway 6 uses a system of cameras and transponders to toll vehicles automatically. The lack of toll booths allows it to operate as a normal freeway with interchanges. A radio antenna detects when a vehicle with a transponder has entered and exited the highway, calculating the toll rate. An automatic license plate recognition system is used for vehicles without a transponder. Monthly statements are mailed to users. Highway 6 is based on the technology of Highway 407 in Ontario, Canada developed by Raytheon.

The pricing scheme is based on the number of segments a driver passes in a trip. Each segment is the road span between two interchanges. As of April 2018, the pricing for up to 3 segments was 19.78 NIS, 23.83 NIS for four segments, and 27.88 NIS for five or more segments. An additional fee is paid when driving through the "northern" segment, the cost of which is an additional 5.74 NIS. Pricing for motorcycles and heavy vehicles such as trucks is different.

The price above is discounted for drivers who register with Highway 6's operator and install the in-vehicle transponder unit (called a "Passkal," lit. "easy-pass") to record their highway usage. When a vehicle does not have a transponder, its license plate is scanned, and the vehicle is identified. Drivers who pre-register their license plate with the operator and establish a direct billing relationship also receive a discounted rate (though they pay more than those who have installed a "Passkal"). The bill is sent to the vehicle's owner if the license plate is not in Highway 6's database, according to the car registration with the Israeli Ministry of Transportation. Such a vehicle pays the highest rate.

The licensed road operator, Derech Eretz, operates a fleet of service vehicles that patrol the entire highway and assist drivers in need. Since it is technically a private road, the road operator must pay the Israel police for traffic enforcement.

The tolled sections north of Yokneam are operated by a separate franchisee called "6 – Northern Crossing." Registration and billing for these sections are handled separately by them, and tolling is performed using automatic license plate recognition only (no tolling by transponder).

== Free segments ==
All the existing (and planned) segments of Highway 6 south of the Soreq interchange are free of charge in both directions, as is the segment between Ben Shemen and Daniyyel interchanges, where Highway 6 runs concurrently with Highway 1. The northern section between Highway 77 and Highway 75 in the western Jezreel Valley is also free (in part of the section where Highway 6 runs concurrently with Highway 70).

== Financial statistics ==
In March 2006, Derech Eretz reported a profit of 89 million NIS for 2005, an increase of 56% from 2004, on income of 779 million NIS, an increase of 137% from 2004.

At the end of 2005:

- about 500,000 registered subscribers (one subscriber can own multiple vehicles),
- 1.36 million individual users (an increase from 1.1 million users),
- 21 million trips,
- 80% of trips are by subscribers,
- Bill collection success rate was 97%.

== Interchanges ==
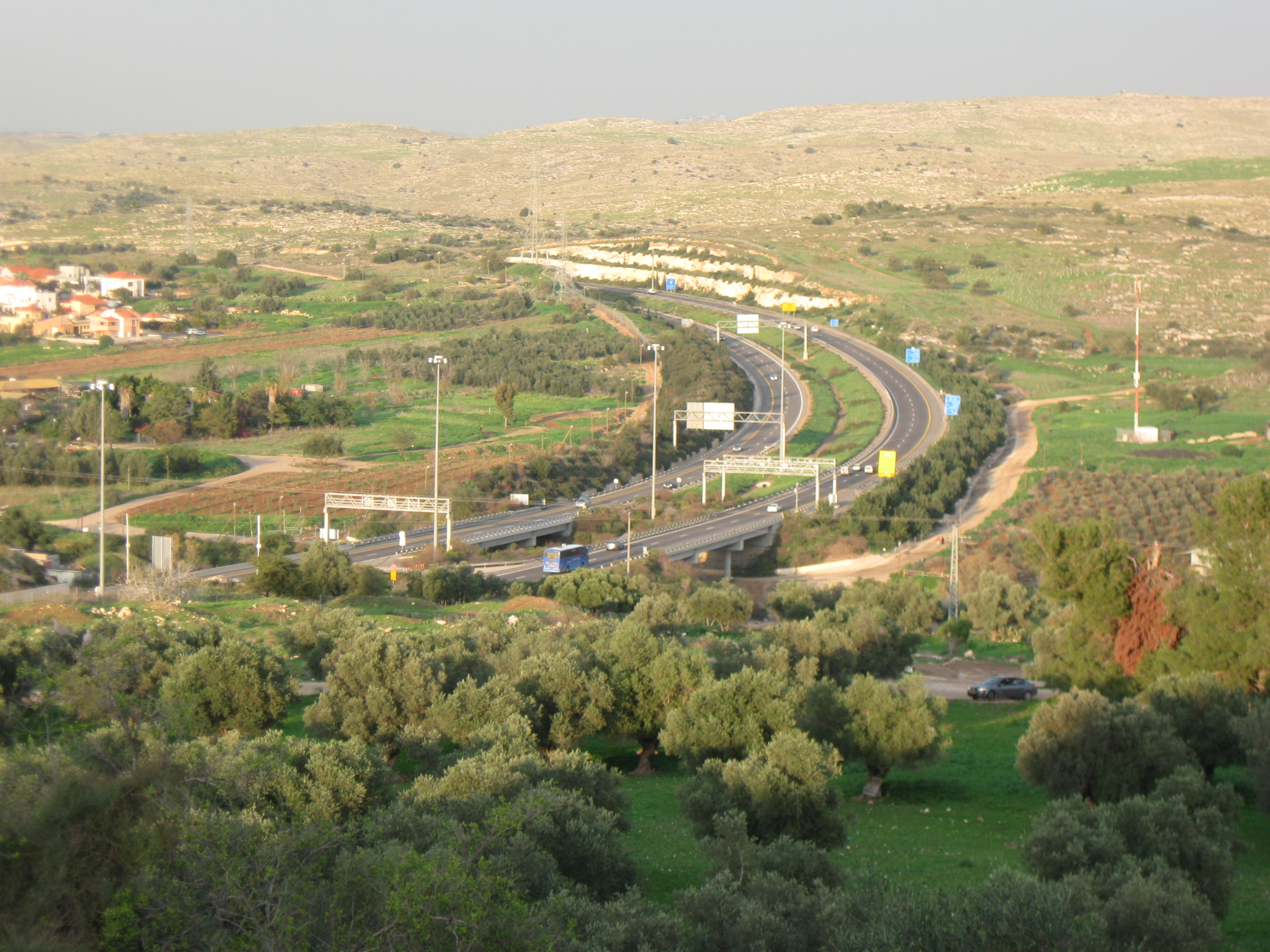
Kvish Shesh

The highway's count starts at 30km since it includes the planned southern extensions.

District	Location	km	mi	Name	Destinations	Notes
Southern	Camp Ariel Sharon	0	0.0	צומת הנגב (HaNegev Junction)	Highway 40; Route 224	Named after the Negev Desert
Southern	Nevatim	19	12	מחלף נבטים (Nevatim Interchange)	Highway 25	
Southern	Tel Shoket	30	19	מחלף שוקת (Shoket Interchange)	Highway 31; Highway 60	
Southern	Lehavim	40	25	מחלף להבים (Lehavim Interchange)	Route 310	
Southern	Rahat	43.5	27.0	מחלף רהט (Rahat Interchange)	Highway 40	Southern end of concurrency with Highway 40
Southern	Dvir	46	29	מחלף דבירה (Devira Interchange)	Route 325	
Southern	Beit Kama	55.5	34.5	מחלף קמה (Kama Interchange)	Route 293	
Southern	Beit Kama	66	41	מחלף מאחז (Ma'ahaz Interchange)	Highway 40 (southbound)	Northern end of concurrency with Highway 40
Southern	Kiryat Gat	76	47	מחלף קרית גת (Kiryat Gat Interchange)	Highway 35	
Central	Yad Binyamin	100	62	מחלף שורק (Sorek Interchange)	Highway 3; Highway 7; (westbound)	Named after nearby Brook of Sorek
Central	Hulda	106	66	מחלף חולדה (Hulda Interchange)	Route 411	
Central	Na'an	111	69	Petrol and rest area	Both Directions	
Central	Ramla	114	71	מחלף נשרים (Nesharim Interchange)	Route 431; Highway 44; Route 424	Named after nearby Nesher Cement Factory
Central	Kfar Daniel	118	73	מחלף דניאל (Daniel Interchange)	Highway 1; (westbound)	
Central	Ben Shemen	122	76	מחלף בן שמן (Ben Shemen Interchange)	Highway 1; (eastbound); Route 443; Route 444	
Central	Tel Hadid	123	76	Tunnels (4 lanes, 450 metres)		
Central	Tel Hadid	123	76	Bridge (2 lanes, 300 metres)		
Central	Beit Nehemiah	124	77	Bridge (2 lanes, 170 metres)		
Central	Giv'at Ko'ah	133	83	מחלף גבעת כ"ח (Giv'at Ko'ah Interchange)	Route 444; Route 461	
Central	Nahshonim	137	85	מחלף נחשונים (Nahshonim Interchange)	Route 471	
Central	Rosh HaAyin	142	88	מחלף קסם (Kessem Interchange)	Highway 5; Route 444	Named after nearby Kafr Qasim
Central	Horshim	145	90	מחלף חורשים (Horshim Interchange)	Route 531; (westbound); Road 5233	
Central	Eyal	153	95	מחלף אייל (Eyal Interchange)	Route 551	
Central	Nitzanei Oz	166	103	מחלף ניצני עוז (Nitzanei Oz Interchange)	Highway 57 (westbound)	
Haifa	Lehavot Haviva	174	108	Petrol and rest area	Both Directions	
Haifa	Baqa al-Gharbiyye	177	110	מחלף באקה (Baqa Interchange)	Highway 9	
Haifa	Barkai	186	116	מחלף עירון (Iron Interchange)	Highway 65	Named after nearby Iron Stream
Haifa	Giv'at Nili	194.5	120.9	Tunnels (2 lanes, 350 metres)		
Northern	Ramot Menashe	200	120	מחלף עין תות (Ein Tut Interchange)	Highway 67	Named after nearby Nahal Tut
Northern	Elyakim	202.5	125.8	מחלף אליקים (Elaykim Interchange)	Route 672	
Northern	Yokneam Illit	206	128	מחלף יקנעם (Yokne'am Interchange)	Route 722	
Northern	Yokneam Illit	206.5	128.3	Tunnels (4 lanes, 1,750 metres)		
Haifa	Kiryat Tiv'on	209	130	מחלף תל קשיש (Tel Qashish Interchange)	Highway 66; Highway 77	
Haifa	Sha'ar HaAmakim	216.5	134.5	מחלף שער העמקים (Sha'ar HaAmakim Interchange)	Highway 75	
Haifa	Rekhasim	219.5	136.4	Tunnels (4 lanes, 2,000 metres)		
Northern	Ibtin	220.5	137.0	Tunnels (4 lanes, 400 metres)		
Haifa	Khawaled	222	138	מחלף גבעות אלונים (Givot Alonim Interchange)	Highway 70 (westbound)	
Haifa	Kiryat Ata	227	141	מחלף סומך (Somech Interchange)	Highway 79; Highway 70; (eastbound)	
Northern	Shfar'am	228	142	מחלף אבליים (Avlayim Interchange)	Route 781; Highway 70	
Northern	Kafr Yasif; Ahihud	240	150	מחלף יאסיף-אחיהוד (Yasif-Ahihud Interchange)	Highway 85; Highway 70	
Northern	Kabri	252	157	מחלף כברי (Yasif-Ahihud Interchange)	Highway 89	
Northern	Shlomi	260	160	מחלף שלומי (Shlomi Interchange)	Route 899	
1.000 mi = 1.609 km; 1.000 km = 0.621 mi: Concurrency terminus; Proposed
