= Khirbet Sharta =

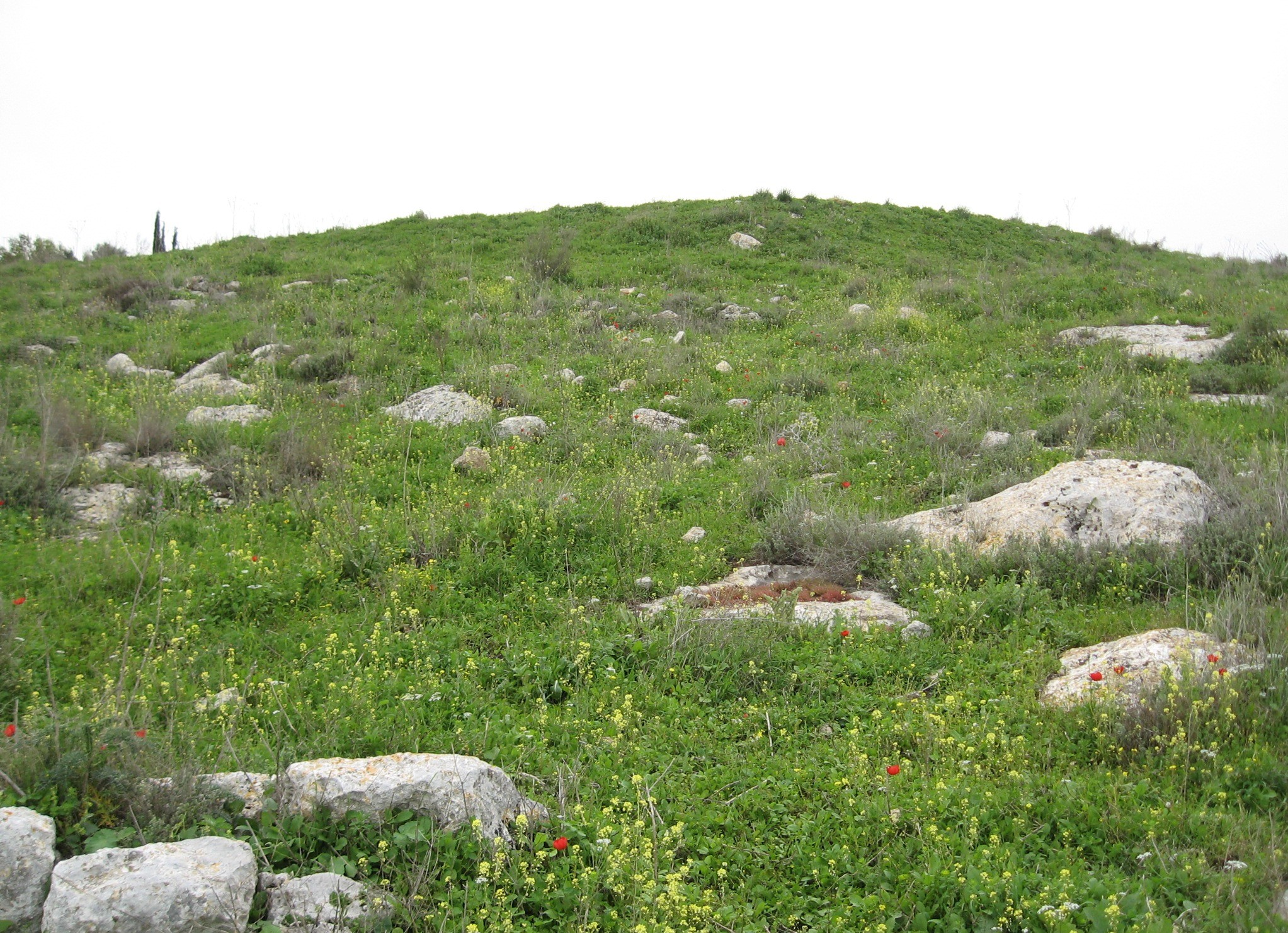

- Location within Israel
- 32.8085°N 35.129°E

Site notes
- Excavation dates: 1965

Khirbet Sharta is an ancient tell in northern Israel, northeast of Kiryat Atta, that covers two hills.

== Archaeology ==
LMLK seal type M2D of the type found at Sharta

In 1965, the Israel Antiquities Authority conducted excavations of the western hill prior to the construction of residential housing in Kiryat Atta.

Discoveries include burial caves with remains from the Bronze, Iron, Hellenistic, Roman, Byzantine, and Arabic eras. The eastern hill is still unexcavated, with visible remains of a 150-meter (490-foot) stone wall built with a double row of large stones, rock cuttings and two wine presses.

== Significance ==
Khirbet Sharta was the first site in the region scientifically excavated that produced a jar handle with a LMLK seal impression, previously thought to have been limited to southern Israel. Similar specimens have been recovered from three other northern sites, the most important being Nahal Tut.
