= Shoket Interchange =

- מחלף שוקת
- The Shoket Interchange

Location
- Bnei Shimon Regional Council
- Roads at junction: Highway 6 Highway 31; Highway 60

Construction
- Opened: November–December 2016

Shoket Interchange is an interchange in the Negev located between Beersheba and Meitar. It is the southern terminus of Highway 6, Israel's central and longest controlled-access highway, also known as the Trans-Israel Highway. Since the continuation of Highway 6 has been suspended, it is unknown if and when the Shoket Interchange will stop being the terminus of Highway 6.

At the Shoket Interchange, Highway 6 connects with Highway 31 and Highway 60 at two different locations. The distance between Interchange Shoket South and Interchange Shoket West is 3.4 kilometers. The distance from Shoket West to the nearby Lakiya Interchange is 4.0 kilometers. The interchange is named after the nearby located Tel Shoket.

The Shoket Interchange opened to traffic in November–December 2016 upon the opening of Highway 6 between Shoket Interchange and Lakiya Interchange, after it was initially planned to open in 2015. The southern section opened in November 2016, the "western" section in December. (note that the "west" section is actually slightly east of the south section) The Lakiya diamond interchange to the northwest was opened in April 2016.

== Interchange structure ==
The interchange is divided into two parts:

In the southern part, Highway 6 from the north connects to Highway 60 towards the west only. Passengers from Highway 60 west to Highway 6 to the north will exit at the interchange to the connector (ramp) passing over a bridge above Highway 60.

In the northern part, Highway 31 passes over Highway 6 on a bridge. Those coming from Highway 31 from the east to Highway 6 to the north will do so by a simple connector that curves from Highway 31 to Highway 6. Those coming from Highway 6 from the north to Highway 6 to the east will do so by a connector in the form of a loop, of more than 270 degrees, that leaves Highway 6 and connects to Highway 31.

All other possible turns at the interchange are made through the Shoket Junction, renamed Meitar Interchange, located east of the Shoket Interchange that connects Highway 31 to Highway 60. This is a diamond intersection with traffic lights on Highway 60.

== Future development ==
The continuation of Highway 6 is planned but suspended from the Shoket Interchange south, towards Nevatim Interchange, where it would connect to Highway 25. In the southern part of the interchange, areas were left for the future connectors at the interchange after the extension of Highway 6 southbound.

In addition, there is a plan to build the Shoket Industrial Park near the Meitar Interchange and the Shoket Interchange. This industrial park will serve as a central employment and industrial center for the residents of the region. Also adjacent to the Shoket Interchange, will be the currently constructed Likit national intelligence center of Israel that may become accessible also by heavy rail.
