= Daniel Interchange =

Key freeway interchange in the Central District of Israel

Daniel Interchange מחלף דניאל
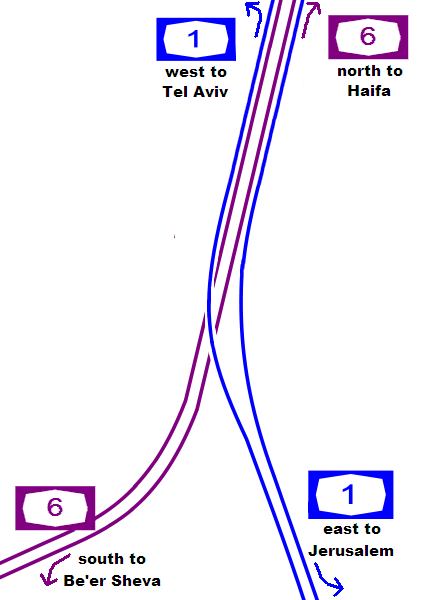
- Map of the interchange

Location
- Central Israel
- Coordinates: 31°56′30″N 34°55′47″E
- Roads at junction: Highway 1 Highway 6

Construction
- Type: Interchange

Daniel Interchange (Hebrew: מחלף דניאל) is a key freeway interchange in the Central District of Israel.

The Daniel Interchange is located west of Kfar Daniel and south of Ben Shemen Interchange. The interchange takes the form of a 1.5 kilometer long road concurrency of Highway 1 and Highway 6 running north–south. It is possible to switch between Highways 1 and 6 only proceeding in the same general direction of north or south (toward Tel Aviv or Jerusalem respectively on Highway 1).

Reversing direction is possible at the adjacent Ben Shemen Interchange to the northwest or via Route 431 to the southeast.
