= Daniyal =

Daniyal دانيال
- Village
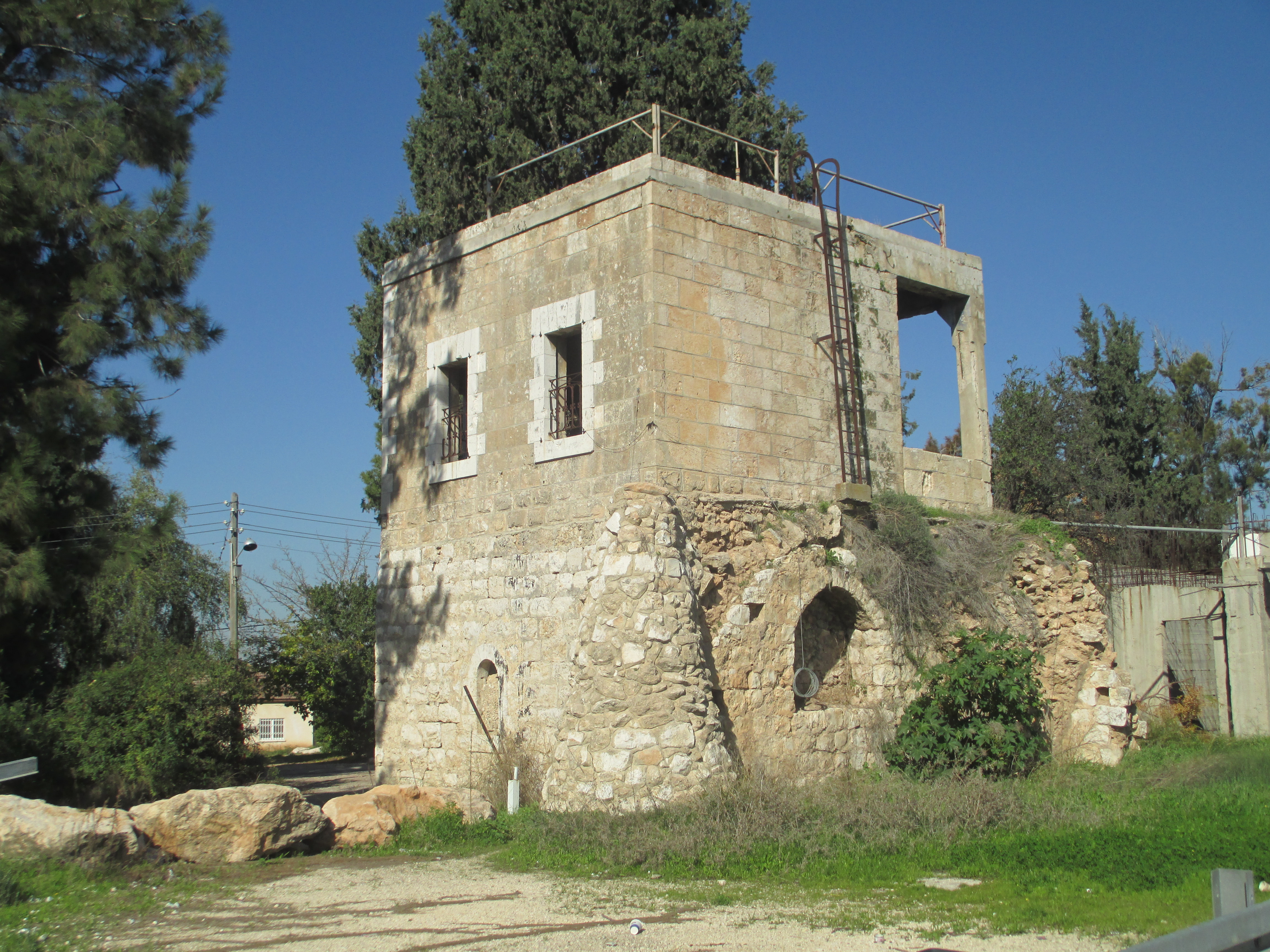
- Pre-1948 structure from Daniyal, photo taken in 2014
- Etymology: Daniel
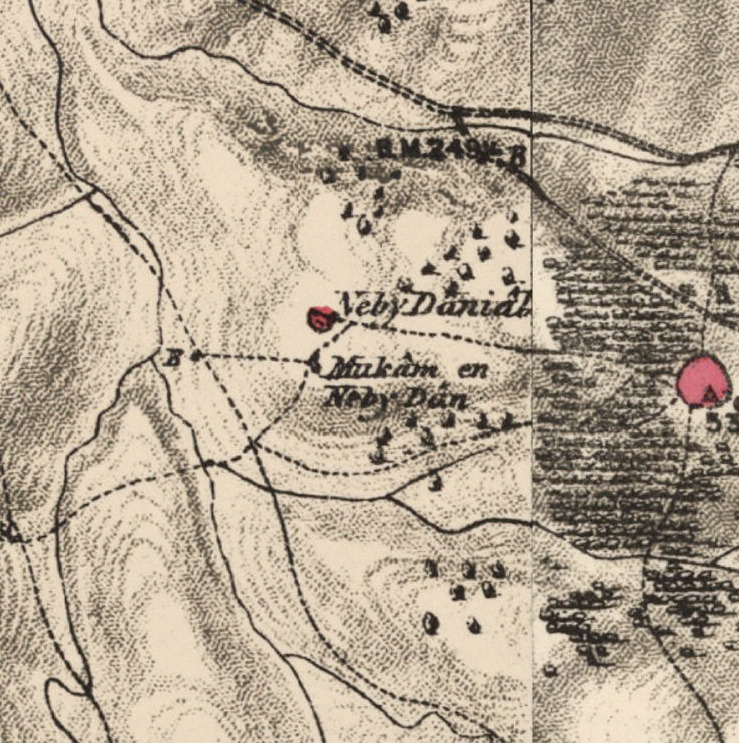
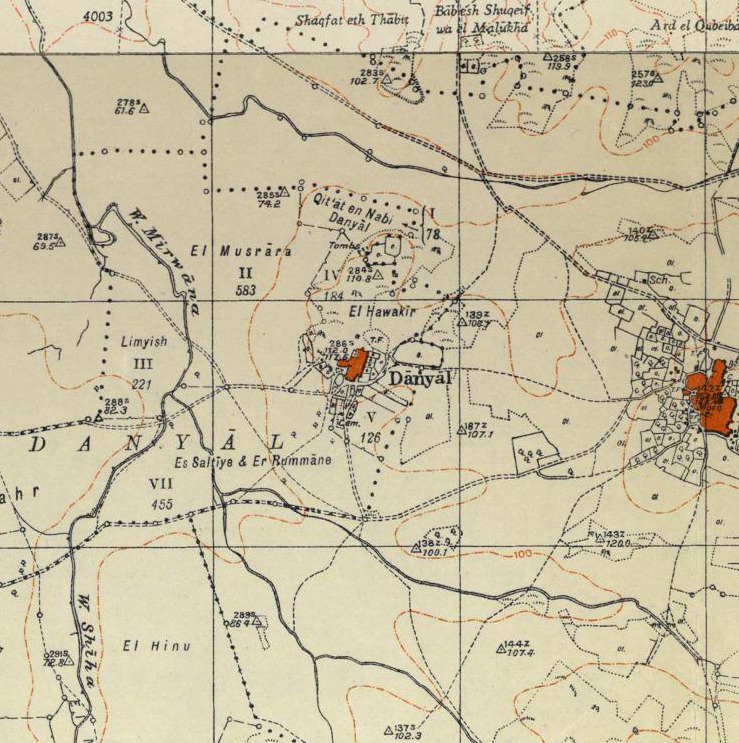
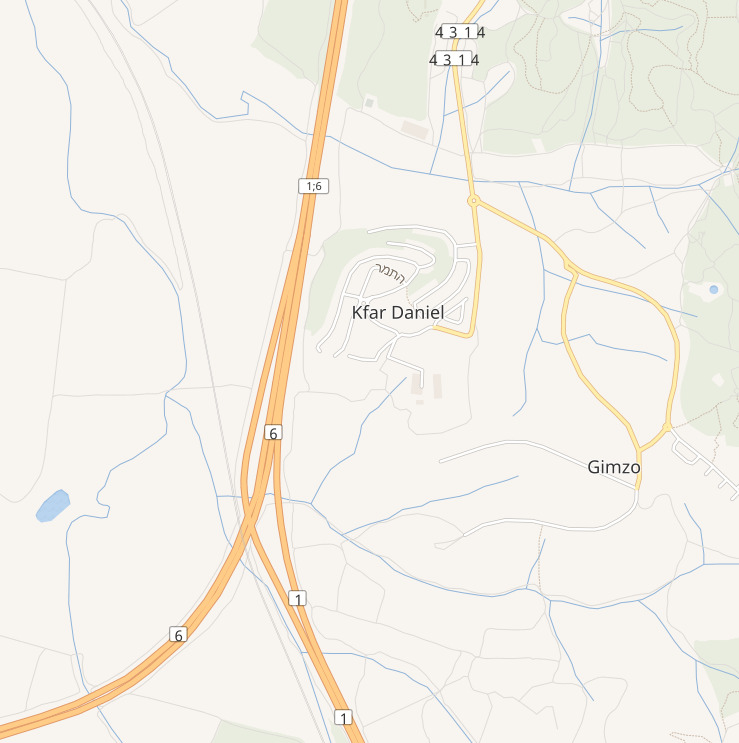
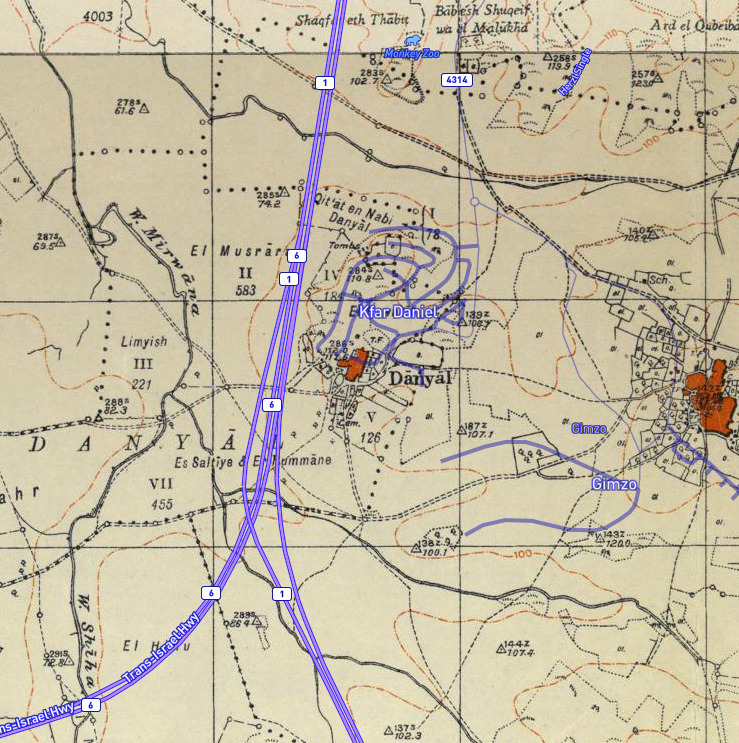
- 1870s map 1940s map modern map 1940s with modern overlay map A series of historical maps of the area around Daniyal (click the buttons)

- Location within Mandatory Palestine
- Coordinates: 31°55′52″N 34°55′53″E
- Palestine grid: 143/148
- Geopolitical entity: Mandatory Palestine
- Subdistrict: Ramle
- Date of depopulation: July 10, 1948

Area
  - Total: 2,808 dunams (2.808 km^{2}; 1.084 sq mi)

Population (1945)
  - Total: 410
- Cause(s) of depopulation: Military assault by Yishuv forces
- Current Localities: Kfar Daniel

Daniyal (Arabic: دانيال) was a Palestinian village in the Ramle Subdistrict that was located 5 km east of Ramla and southeast of Lydda. It was depopulated during the 1948 Arab–Israeli War on July 10, 1948, by the Yiftach Brigade under the first phase of Operation Dani, as part of the broader 1948 Palestinian expulsion and flight and Nakba.

== History ==
In 1838, Edward Robinson stopped by the village well, west of the village. He estimated the depth of the well to be 160 feet. The villagers were Muslim, and the village was noted as being in the Lydda District. It was populated by residents from Rafat, Jerusalem who established it as a dependency - or satellite village - of their home village.

In 1863, Victor Guérin noted: "a small mosque situated on a height; it contains the tomb of a saint, called Neby Danyal. Some olive trees and a palm tree surround it. Near there is a village of about forty houses, also called Danyal. I observed there, not far from the dwellings, a considerable number of silos, intended to preserve straw, barley, and wheat."

An official village list of about 1870 showed that the village had 24 houses and a population of 80, though the population count included men, only.

In 1882, the PEF's Survey of Western Palestine (SWP) described Neby Danial: "A small settlement round the sacred shrine of the Prophet, with a well to the west. The tomb of Dan is shown here, and is believed by the Samaritans to be the true site." They further noted that: "The village of Neby Danial includes the Mukam of Neby Dan, from which it is said by the natives to take its name."

=== British Mandate era ===
In the 1922 census of Palestine conducted by the British Mandate authorities, Danial had a population of 277 Muslims, increasing slightly in the 1931 census to 284 Muslims, in a total of 71 houses.

In the 1945 statistics, it had a population of 410 Muslims with a total of 2,808 dunums of land. Of this, 37 dunums were for plantations and irrigable land, 2,599 dunums were for cereals, while a total of 15 dunams were classified as built-up areas.

An elementary school for boys which is still standing today was founded in 1945, and had an enrollment of 55 students.

=== 1948 war and depopulation ===
During the 1948 Palestine war, the village was depopulated by Israeli forces as part of the broader 1948 Palestinian expulsion and flight. The village was attacked by the IDF on the 10 July 1948. On that day, the Yiftach Brigade reported: "Our forces are clearing the Innaba – Jimzu – Daniyal area and are torching everything that can be burned." On July 11, they reported that they had conquered Jimzu and Daniel and were "busy clearing the villages and blowing up the houses."

Historian Saleh Abdel Jawad writes that upon the Israeli conquest of the village that "indiscriminate killings" occurred in Daniyal, with the IDF having first shelled the village to induce civilian flight and afterwards killing any residents who remained, with at least 9 residents being killed after the capture of the village. (Note: Saleh Abdel Jawad, 2007, Zionist Massacres: the Creation of the Palestinian Refugee Problem in the 1948 War. "Indiscriminate killings occur. IDF shelling induces most villagers to flee. All who remain are killed. Two Egyptian stable hands and three old women are instantly killed. Troops find one elderly man hiding with his wife in a cave. The couple is shot. The man is killed, but his wife is only injured. She receives medical treatment from the Israelis. Another three old women remain in the village for a relatively long time, but are also subsequently killed.")

In September, 1948, Daniyal was among the Palestinian villages that Ben Gurion wanted destroyed.

The Israeli settlement of Kfar Daniel was established on village land in 1949.

In 1992 the remains of the village was described by historian Walid Khalidi: "The shrine of al-Nabi Daniyal, the school, and seven well built houses are all that remain of the village. The shrine, deserted and weathered amid weeds and a few trees, is made of stone, with a second story rising on one side. The first story has arched windows and doors and the second has a porch and a rectangular window. The school is presently used by residents of Kefar Daniyyel. The houses are built of stone and are all flat-roofed, with a mix of arched and rectangular doors and windows. One house is used as a warehouse."

Its Arab settlers left to neighboring countries and territories such as Jordan and the West Bank. Others later settled in the United States of America in the States of Texas and Illinois. The descendants of those who were forced to leave their homes face many difficulties from local Israeli authority when attempting to revisit the land where the village once stood.

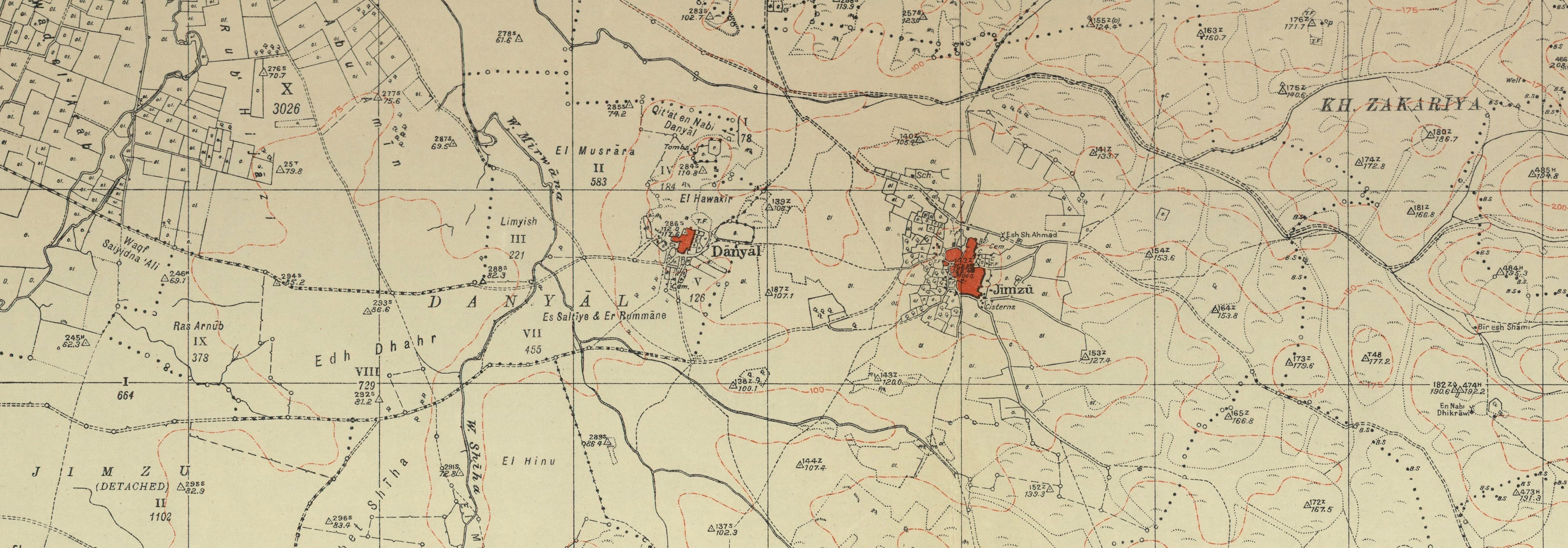
Daniyal 1942 1:20,000

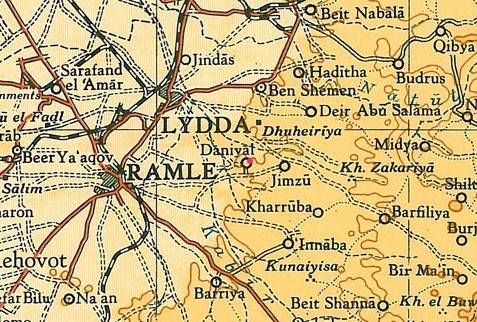
Daniyal. Survey of Palestine. 1945. Scale 1:250,000

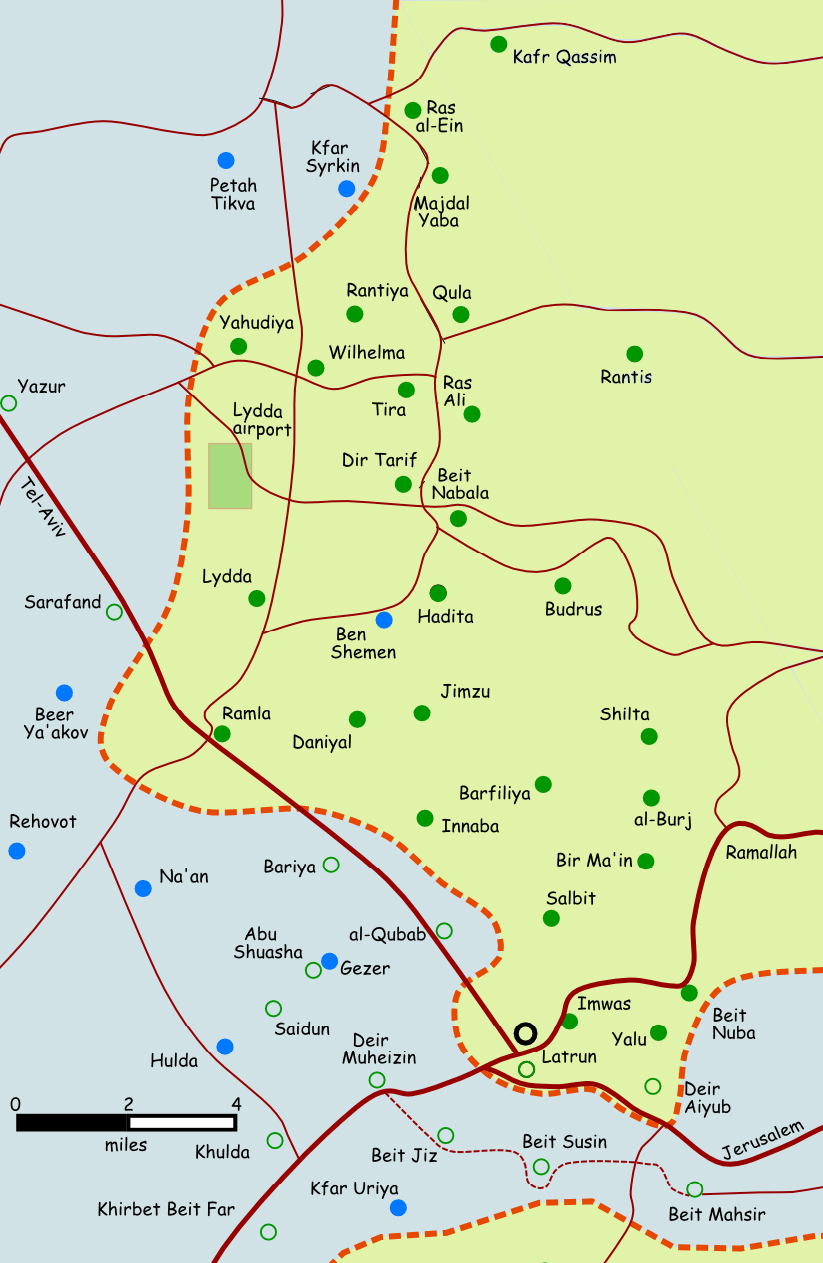
Depopulated villages in the Ramle Subdistrict

== Bibliography ==
- Barron, J. B., ed. (1923). Palestine: Report and General Abstracts of the Census of 1922. Government of Palestine.
- Conder, C.R.; Kitchener, H. H. (1882). The Survey of Western Palestine: Memoirs of the Topography, Orography, Hydrography, and Archaeology. Vol. 2. London: Committee of the Palestine Exploration Fund.
- Department of Statistics (1945). Village Statistics, April, 1945. Government of Palestine.
- Guérin, V. (1868). Description Géographique Historique et Archéologique de la Palestine (in French). Vol. 1: Judee, pt. 1. Paris: L'Imprimerie Nationale.
- Hadawi, S. (1970). Village Statistics of 1945: A Classification of Land and Area ownership in Palestine. Palestine Liberation Organization Research Center.
- Hartmann, M. (1883). "Die Ortschaftenliste des Liwa Jerusalem in dem türkischen Staatskalender für Syrien auf das Jahr 1288 der Flucht (1871)". Zeitschrift des Deutschen Palästina-Vereins. 6: 102–149.
- Khalidi, W. (1992). All That Remains: The Palestinian Villages Occupied and Depopulated by Israel in 1948. Washington D.C.: Institute for Palestine Studies. ISBN 0-88728-224-5.
- Mills, E., ed. (1932). Census of Palestine 1931. Population of Villages, Towns and Administrative Areas. Jerusalem: Government of Palestine.
- Morris, B. (2004). The Birth of the Palestinian Refugee Problem Revisited. Cambridge University Press. ISBN 978-0-521-00967-6.
- Palmer, E. H. (1881). The Survey of Western Palestine: Arabic and English Name Lists Collected During the Survey by Lieutenants Conder and Kitchener, R. E. Transliterated and Explained by E.H. Palmer. Committee of the Palestine Exploration Fund.
- Robinson, E.; Smith, E. (1841). Biblical Researches in Palestine, Mount Sinai and Arabia Petraea: A Journal of Travels in the year 1838. Vol. 3. Boston: Crocker & Brewster.
- Socin, A. (1879). "Alphabetisches Verzeichniss von Ortschaften des Paschalik Jerusalem". Zeitschrift des Deutschen Palästina-Vereins. 2: 135–163.
