= Nachum Ish Gamzu =

1st century CE Jewish scholar and sage

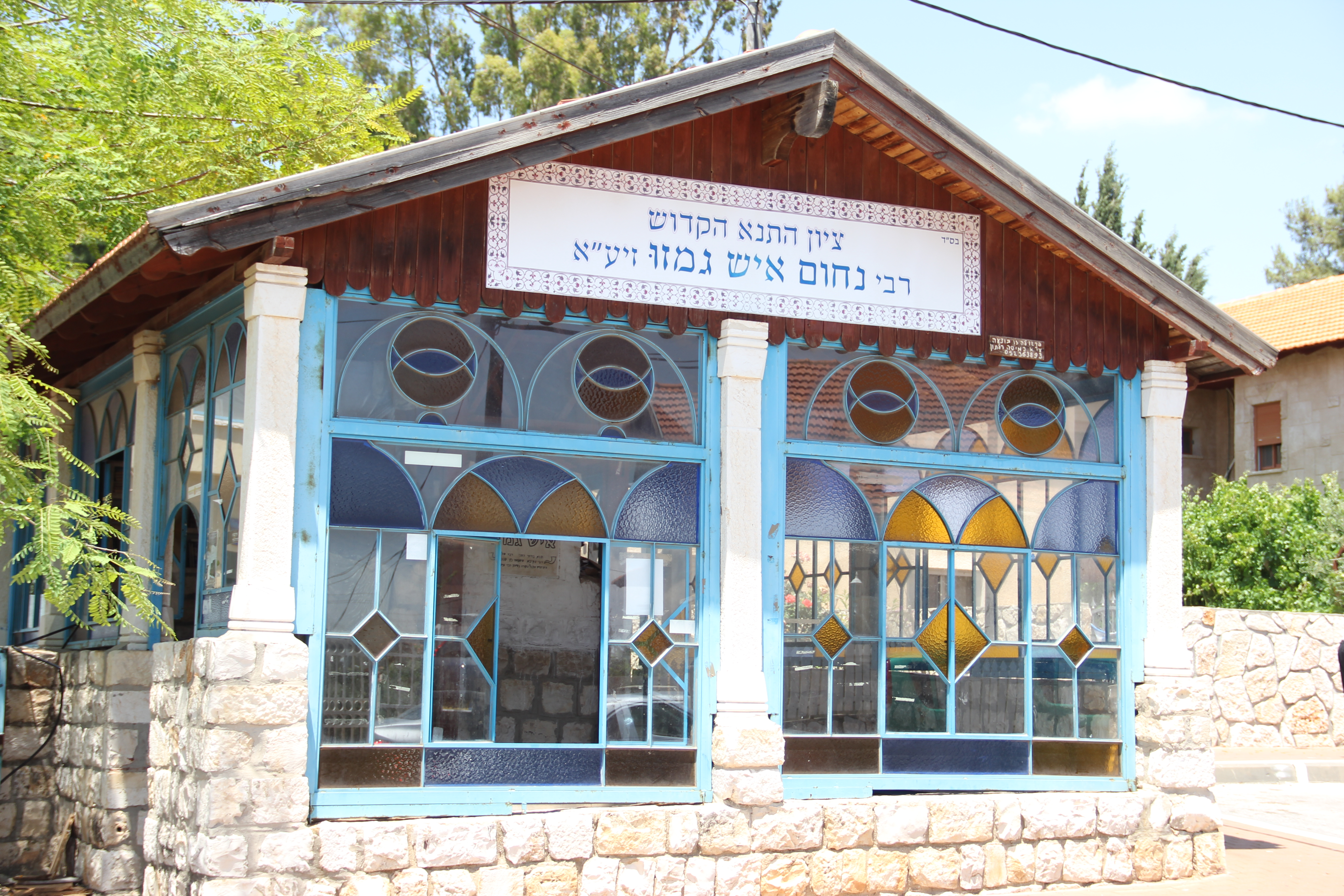
The tomb of Rabbi Nachum Ish Gamzu, Gamzu Street, Safed, Israel.

Nachum Ish Gamzu (Hebrew: נחום איש גמזו, Naḥum Ish Gamzu) was a tanna (Jewish sage) of the second generation (first century).

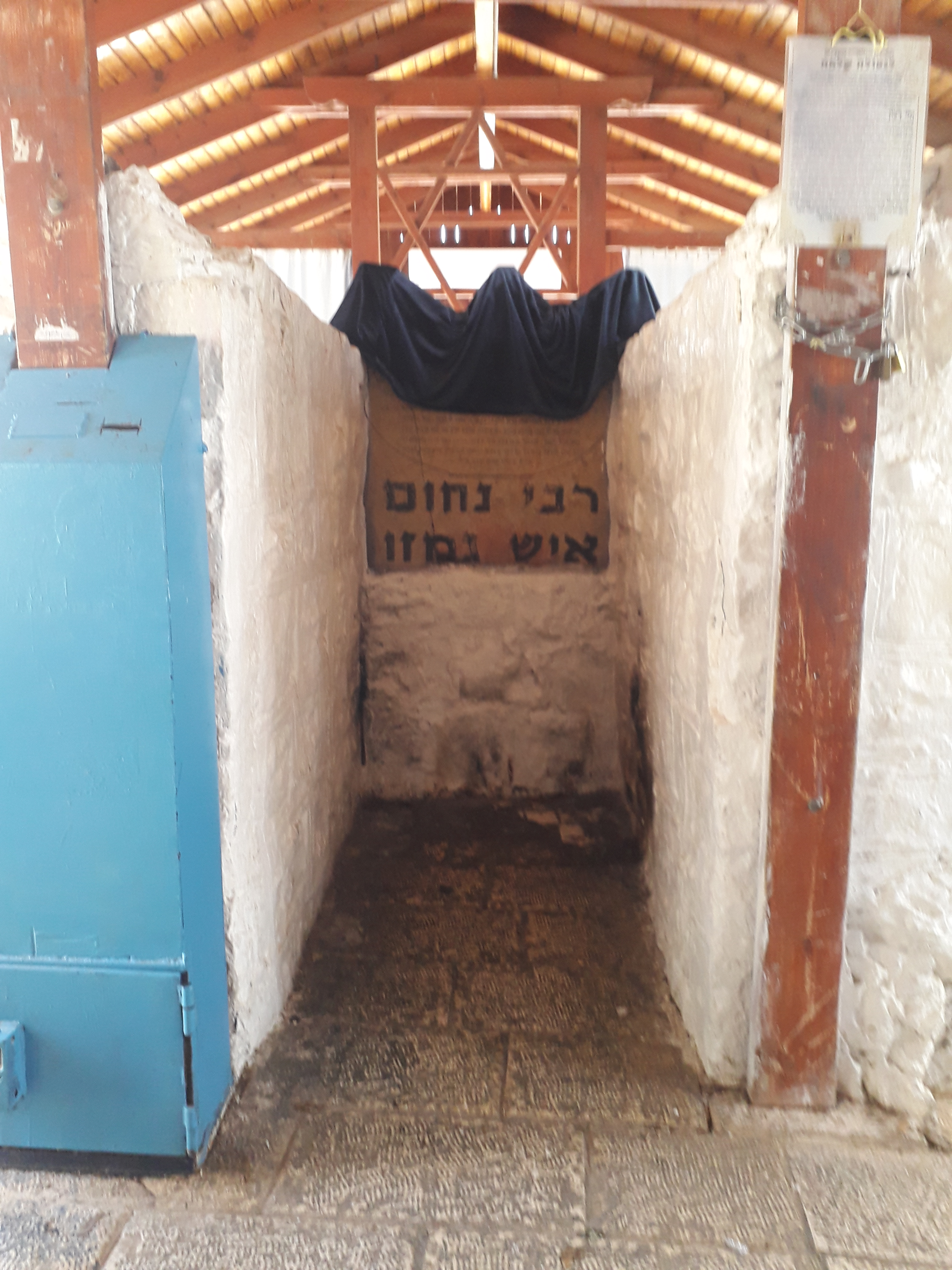
Interior of Nachum Ish Gamzu's tomb

== Name ==
Nachum Ish Gamzu's name is described in the Talmud as having grown colloquially from Nachum's tendency to react to misfortune with unyielding optimism, in each case uttering a phrase that became famously attached to him: "gam zu le-tovah," meaning, "this, too, is for the best." The two words "gam zu" ("גם זו", meaning "this too") were combined into the single-word nickname "Gamzu" ("גמזו"), with "Ish Gamzu" then meaning "The Gamzu Man".

Alternatively, Nathan ben Jehiel (in his Arukh) describes Nachum's surname as being "Ish Gimzo", or "the man from Gimzo," based on the fact that there was a town named Gimzo in Israel at the time. This interpretation is less commonly used, possibly due to its existence in a work by a sole author outside the Talmud, whereas the Ish Gamzu explanation above exists within the Talmud itself, a more primary and respected text.

There are references in the Talmud to a Nechemiah ha`Imsoni, who has been proposed as possibly being the same person as Nachum Ish Gamzu.

== Life ==
Nachum was the teacher of Rabbi Akiva, and taught him the exegetical principle of inclusion and exclusion ("ribbui u-mi'uṭ"). Only one halakhah of his has been preserved; but it is known that he interpreted the whole Torah according to the rule of "ribbui u-mi'uṭ". He used to explain the accusative particle "et" by saying that it implied the inclusion in the object of something besides that which is explicitly mentioned. However, in the sentence "You shall fear [et] the Lord your God", he did not explain the particle "et" before "the Lord," since he did not wish to cause any one else to share in the reverence due to God; he justified his inconsistency with the explanation that the omission in this passage was as virtuous as was his resort to interpretation in all the other passages.

It is related that in later years Nahum's hands and feet became paralyzed, and he was afflicted with other bodily ailments. He bore his troubles patiently, however, and even rejoiced over them. In answer to a question of his pupils as to why, since he was such a perfectly just man, he had to endure so many ills, he declared that he had brought them on himself because once when he was on the way to his father-in-law's and was carrying many things to eat and drink, he met a poor man who asked him for food. As he was about to open the bundle the man died before his eyes. In deepest grief, and reproaching himself with having perhaps caused by his delay the man's death, he cursed himself and wished himself all the troubles to which his pupils referred. Various other stories are told of miracles that happened to him.

One tradition places the burial site of Rabbi Nachum Ish Gamzu in Safed, Israel, and his tomb may be found in Gamzu Street, named for him, inside a modern protective structure. Another tradition places his burial site on the main road as one approaches Farradiyya (Parod).
