= Tel Shoket =

- תל שוקת (Hebrew)
- Interactive map of Tel Shoket
- 31.3101°N 34.9085°E
- Cultures: Chalcolithic, Israelite–Roman
- Location: Bnei Shimon, Israel

Site notes
- Elevation: 358 m (1,175 ft)
- Public access: Yes, free

Tel Shoket (Hebrew: תל שוקת) is an Israeli tell or archaeological hill in the north of the Negev. It is located adjacent to Highway 60, between the Meitar Interchange and Meitar. Tel Shoket gave name to the Shoket Interchange nearby.

At Tel Shoket, there is a Muslim cemetery that serves the residents of the nearby Bedouin town of Hura and the Bedouin villages and hamlets in the region. There also is a grove and some agriculture.

== History ==
Pottery found on the tell indicates that the place was settled in the Chalcolithic period, after which the site was inhabited continuously from the Israelite period to the Roman period.

Some identify Tel Shoket with the biblical town of Lebaot (also called Beit Lebaot or Beit Barai), mentioned in the list of cities received by the tribe of Shimon within the territory of the tribe of Judah. Others identify it with Beit Pelet mentioned in the book of Nehemiah as one of the southern settlements where the people of Judah lived during the Persian period.

During the campaign for Sinai and Palestine in World War I, about 1,100 Ottoman soldiers from the 3rd Cavalry Division were stationed at Tel Shoket. As the Australian and New Zealand Army Corps approached Tel Be'er Sheva in preparation for the 1917 Battle of Beersheba, they encountered massive fire from the fortified Ottoman positions that slowed the advancement from Beersheba to Hebron and Jerusalem.
