= Bat Shlomo =

Bat Shlomo: בָּת שְׁלֹמֹה (Hebrew)
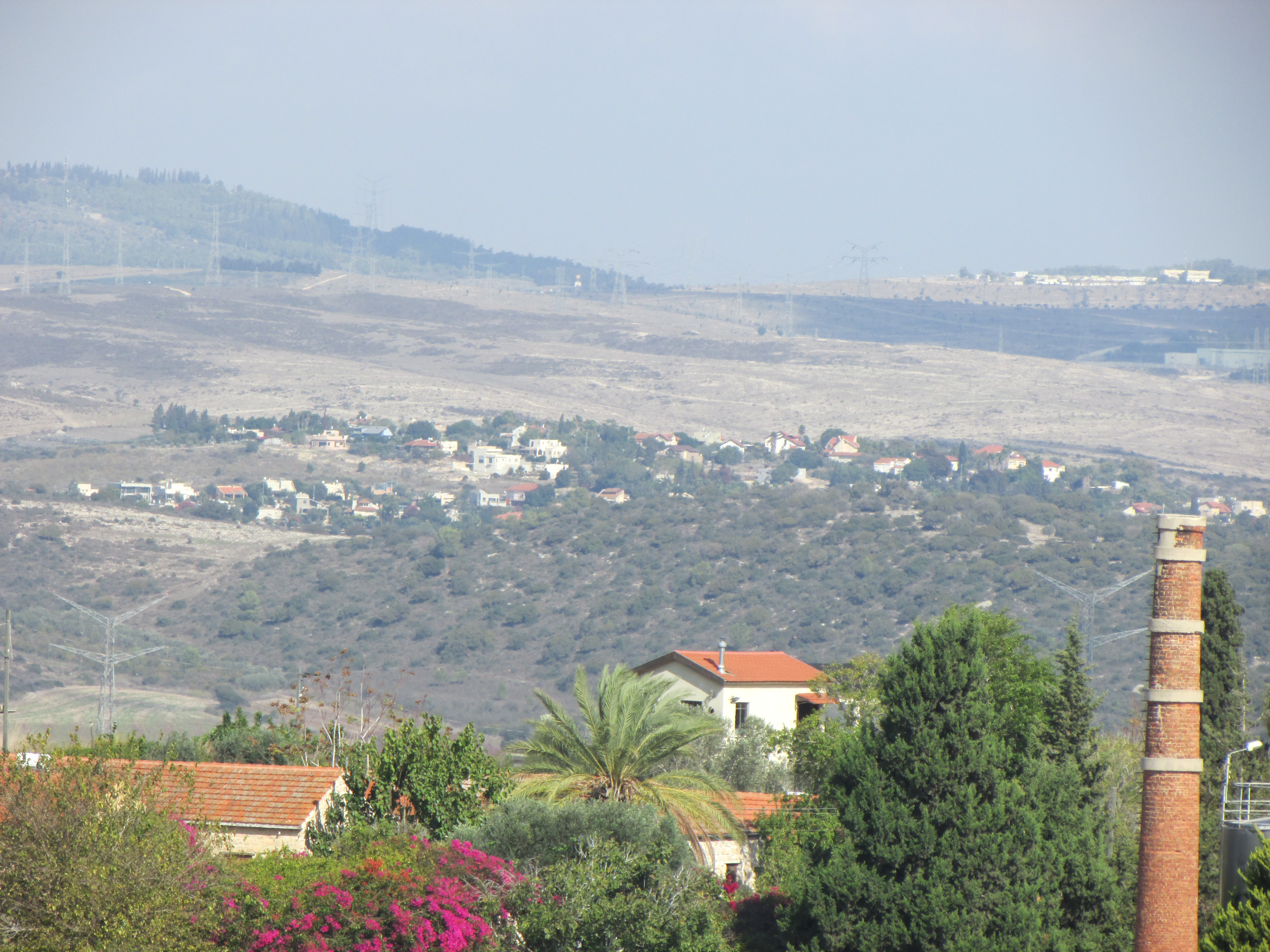
- Bat Shlomo as seen from Zikhron Ya'akov

- Location within Haifa region of Israel
- Coordinates: 32°35′49″N 35°0′12″E
- Country: Israel
- District: Haifa
- Subdistrict: Hadera
- Council: Hof HaCarmel
- Affiliation: Hitahdut HaIkarim
- Founded: 1889
- Founder: Villagers from Zikhron Ya'akov
- Population (2024): 660

Bat Shlomo (Hebrew: בָּת שְׁלֹמֹה, lit. 'Salomon's Daughter') is a moshav in northern Israel. Located on the southern slopes of Mount Carmel near Binyamina and Zikhron Ya'akov, it originally was built on 8,068 dunams of land. It falls under the jurisdiction of Hof HaCarmel Regional Council and had a population of 660 in 2024.

== History ==
The village was established in 1889 as a daughter-settlement of Zikhron Ya'akov, funded by Baron Rothschild, on land purchased from the Arab village of Umm al-Tut. It was named after Betty von Rothschild, the daughter of Salomon Mayer von Rothschild (the Baron's uncle and grandfather). According to a census conducted in 1922 by the British Mandate authorities, Bat Shlomo had a population of 66 inhabitants, consisting of 53 Jews and 13 Muslims. By 1947 it had a population of 100. In 1951 a moshav was established by Transylvanian and Yemenite immigrants adjacent to the original village.

== Economy ==
The moshav has a long-standing tradition of viticulture and agriculture. The Bat Shlomo Winery has been operating since 1889,"Bat Shlomo Winery - A family tradition of four generations" (in Hebrew). Bat Shlomo Winery. alongside the Schwartzman Dairy, which is run by the Schwartzman family, among the original founders of the moshava."Schwartzman Dairy - Homepage" (in Hebrew). Bat Shlomo - Cheese.

The moshav was a major grape supplier to the Carmel Winery until the 1970s, when it began producing loquats. In 2010, an additional boutique winery, Bat Shlomo Vineyards, was established by Elie Wurtman and Ari Erle."Bat Shlomo Vineyards Story".
