= Qastina =

Qastina قسطينة Kastina
- Village
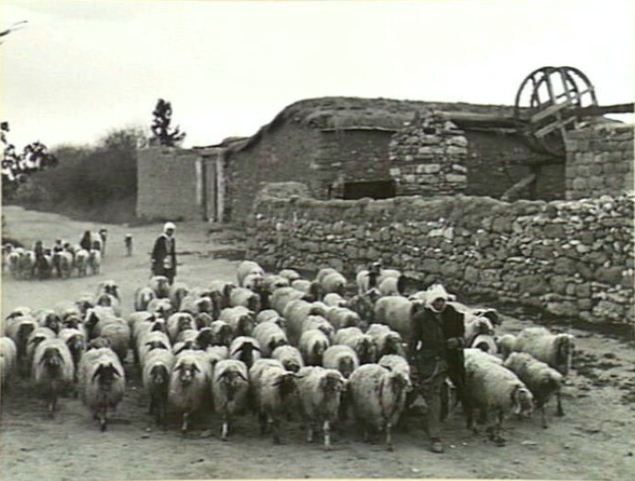
- Shepherd with sheep in Qastina, before 1948
- Etymology: El Kustîneh, Kŭstîleh, i.e., Castellum
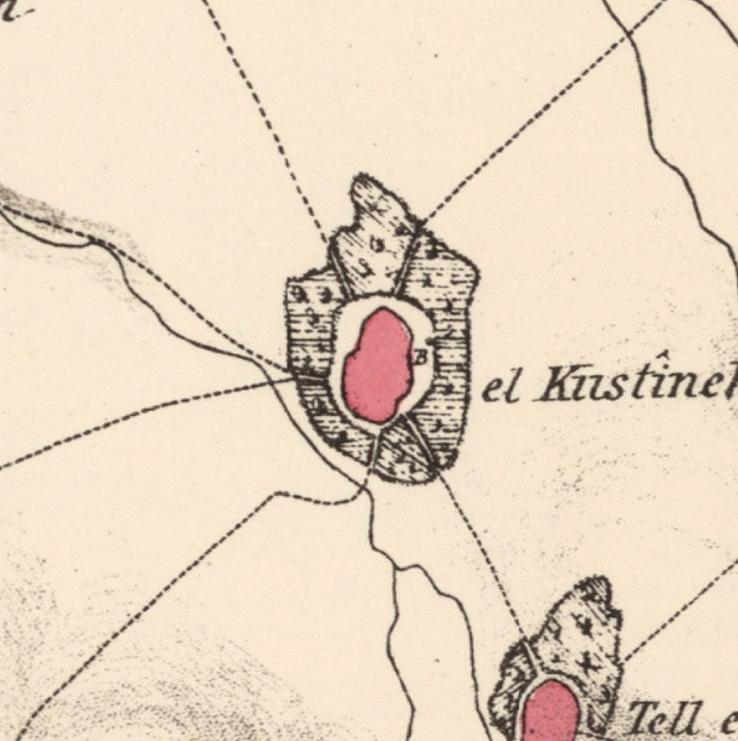
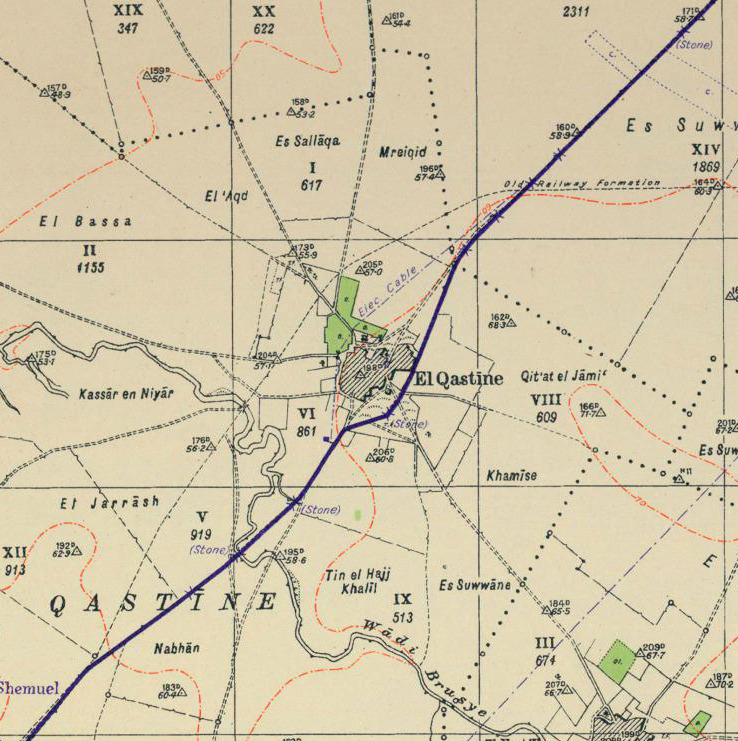
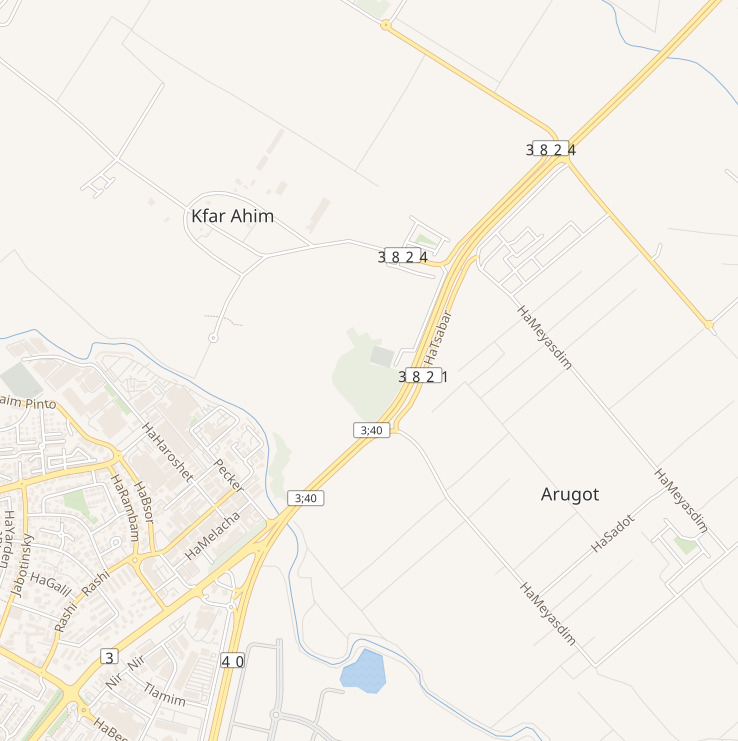
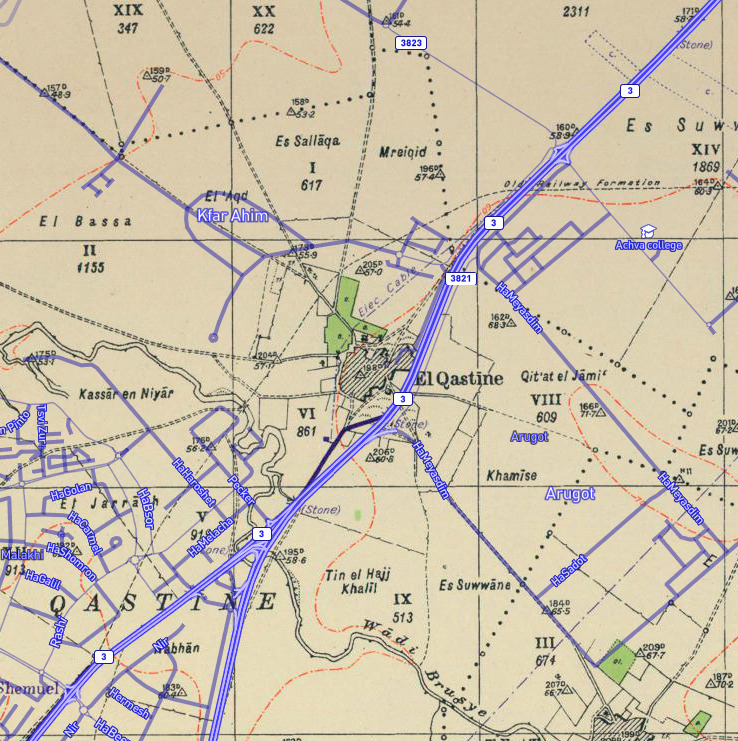
- 1870s map 1940s map modern map 1940s with modern overlay map A series of historical maps of the area around Qastina (click the buttons)

- Location within Mandatory Palestine
- Coordinates: 31°44′21″N 34°45′44″E
- Palestine grid: 127/127
- Geopolitical entity: Mandatory Palestine
- Subdistrict: Gaza
- Date of depopulation: 9 July 1948

Area
  - Total: 12,019 dunams (12.019 km^{2}; 4.641 sq mi)

Population (1945)
  - Total: 890
- Cause(s) of depopulation: Military assault by Yishuv forces
- Secondary cause: Influence of nearby town's fall
- Current Localities: Kfar Warburg, Arugot, Kfar Ahim, Avigdor, Kiryat Malakhi

Qastina (Arabic: قسطينة) was a Palestinian village, located 38 kilometers northeast of Gaza City. It was depopulated during the 1948 Arab-Israeli war.

== Location ==
Qastina was situated on an elevated spot in a generally flat area on the coastal plain, on the highway between al-Majdal and the Jerusalem-Jaffa highway. A British military camp, Beer Tuvia, was 3 km. southwest of the village.

== History ==
=== Ottoman period ===
Qastina was incorporated into the Ottoman Empire in 1517 with the rest of Palestine, and by the 1596 tax records, it was a village in the nahiya (subdistrict) of Gaza under the liwa' (district) of Gaza, with a population of 55 households and 15 bachelors, an estimated 385 persons. All the villagers were Muslim. They paid a fixed tax rate of 33,3% on a number of crops, including wheat, barley and sesame, and fruits, as well as goats, beehives and vineyards; a total of 13,100 akçe. 5/6 of the revenue went to a Muslim charitable endowment.

The Syrian Sufi teacher and traveller Mustafa al-Bakri al-Siddiqi (1688-1748/9) reported travelling through the village in the first half of the eighteenth century, on his way to al-Masmiyya al-Kabira.

In 1838, Edward Robinson saw el-Kustineh located northwest of Tell es-Safi, where he was staying, and noted it as a Muslim village located in the Gaza district.

In 1863, the French explorer Victor Guérin visited the village, called Kasthineh. He found it had four hundred inhabitants. Near the mouth of a well were the remains of an antique gray-white marble column, while two palm trees and three acacia mimosas shaded the cemetery.

An Ottoman village list of about 1870 showed that Qastina had 152 houses and a population of 469, though the population count included men only. In 1882, the PEF's Survey of Western Palestine described Qastina as a village laid out in a northwest–southeast direction on flat ground. It had adobe brick structures, a well, and gardens.

=== British Mandate period ===
In the 1922 census of Palestine conducted by the British Mandate authorities, the village had a population of 406 inhabitants, all Muslims, increasing in the 1931 census when it had an all-Muslim population of 593 in 147 houses.

The villagers had a mosque, and in 1936 an elementary school was started, which was shared with the neighbouring village of Tall al-Turmus. By the mid-1940s the school had 161 students.

In 1939 Kfar Warburg was established on what was traditionally village land, 3 km southwest of the village site. During the Second World War, the village played host to many elements of the Allied forces, including the HQ for the Australian 6th Division.

By the 1945 statistics the population was 890, all Muslims, with a total of 12,019 dunams of land. The villagers lived mostly of agriculture. In addition, villagers raised animals and poultry, and worked in the British military camp (Beer Tuvia) nearby. In 1944–45 a total of 235 dunums was used for citrus and bananas, 7,317 dunums used for cereals, 770 dunums were irrigated or used for orchards, while 37 dunams were built-up, urban, land.

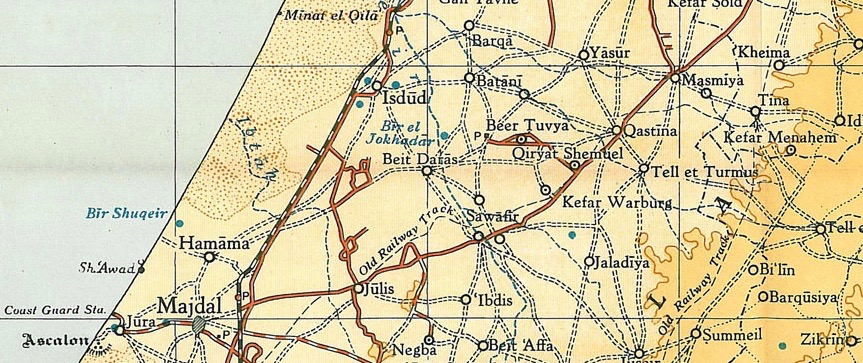
Qastina 1945 1:250,000

=== 1948 war ===
Qastina was in the territory allotted to the Arab state under the 1947 UN Partition Plan. Upon Israel's declaration of independence on 15 May 1948, the armies of neighbouring Arab states invaded, prompting fresh evacuations of civilians fearful of being caught up in the fighting. The women and children of Qastina were sent away to the village of Tell es-Safi by the menfolk at this time, but they returned after discovering there was insufficient water in the host village to meet the newcomers' needs.

A preparatory order for the conquest of Qastina and other neighbouring villages (Masmiya al Kabira, Masmiya al Saghira, al Tina and Tall al Turmus) was drafted by the Giv'ati Brigade's 51st Battalion and produced on 29 June 1948. According to Benny Morris, the document recommended "the 'liquidation' (hisul) of the two Masmiya villages and 'burning' (bi'ur) the rest."

On 9 July 1948, the village and its over 147 houses were completely destroyed by Israeli forces after its inhabitants fled an assault by the Givati Brigade in Operation An-Far. Qastina was used as a rallying point by the IDF seventh Battalion of the 8th Armored Brigade after the failed attack on Iraq al-Manshiyya in part of the Israeli drive to open a route to the Negev during Operation Yoav.

=== Israel after 1948 war ===
In early 1949 Quaker relief workers reported that many those living in tents in what became Maghazi refugee camp had come from Qastina.

Following the war the area was incorporated into the State of Israel and four villages were later established on the lands of Qastina; Arugot and Kfar Ahim were founded in 1949 after the village had been destroyed. They were followed by Avigdor in 1950 and Kiryat Malakhi in 1951. Be'er Tuvia, which was also known by the name Qastina after its establishment in 1887, lies adjacent.

In 1992, Walid Khalidi notes of Qastina that:

"All that remains is the debris of houses strewn across the site. The research team investigating the current status of the depopulated villages visited the site and found it overgrown with bushes and tall grasses that were about 2m high."

Nowadays, Qastina is the popular name for Malakhi Junction.

== See also ==
- Depopulated Palestinian locations in Israel
- RAF Qastina

== Bibliography ==
- Barron, J. B., ed. (1923). Palestine: Report and General Abstracts of the Census of 1922. Government of Palestine.
- Conder, C.R.; Kitchener, H. H. (1882). The Survey of Western Palestine: Memoirs of the Topography, Orography, Hydrography, and Archaeology. Vol. 2. London: Committee of the Palestine Exploration Fund.
- Department of Statistics (1945). Village Statistics, April, 1945. Government of Palestine.
- Guérin, V. (1869). Description Géographique Historique et Archéologique de la Palestine (in French). Vol. 1: Judee, pt. 2. Paris: L'Imprimerie Nationale.
- Hadawi, S. (1970). Village Statistics of 1945: A Classification of Land and Area ownership in Palestine. Palestine Liberation Organization Research Centre.
- Hartmann, M. (1883). "Die Ortschaftenliste des Liwa Jerusalem in dem türkischen Staatskalender für Syrien auf das Jahr 1288 der Flucht (1871)". Zeitschrift des Deutschen Palästina-Vereins. 6: 102–149.
- Hütteroth, W.-D.; Abdulfattah, K. (1977). Historical Geography of Palestine, Transjordan and Southern Syria in the Late 16th Century. Erlanger Geographische Arbeiten, Sonderband 5. Erlangen, Germany: Vorstand der Fränkischen Geographischen Gesellschaft. ISBN 3-920405-41-2.
- Khalidi, W. (1992). All That Remains: The Palestinian Villages Occupied and Depopulated by Israel in 1948. Washington D.C.: Institute for Palestine Studies. ISBN 0-88728-224-5.
- Mills, E., ed. (1932). Census of Palestine 1931. Population of Villages, Towns and Administrative Areas. Jerusalem: Government of Palestine.
- Morris, B. (2004). The Birth of the Palestinian Refugee Problem Revisited. Cambridge University Press. ISBN 978-0-521-00967-6.
- Palmer, E. H. (1881). The Survey of Western Palestine: Arabic and English Name Lists Collected During the Survey by Lieutenants Conder and Kitchener, R. E. Transliterated and Explained by E.H. Palmer. Committee of the Palestine Exploration Fund.
- Robinson, E.; Smith, E. (1841). Biblical Researches in Palestine, Mount Sinai and Arabia Petraea: A Journal of Travels in the year 1838. Vol. 2. Boston: Crocker & Brewster.
- Robinson, E.; Smith, E. (1841). Biblical Researches in Palestine, Mount Sinai and Arabia Petraea: A Journal of Travels in the year 1838. Vol. 3. Boston: Crocker & Brewster.
- Shapira, A. (2008). Yigal Allon; Native Son; A Biography. Translated by Evelyn Abel. University of Pennsylvania Press. ISBN 978-0-8122-4028-3.
- Socin, A. (1879). "Alphabetisches Verzeichniss von Ortschaften des Paschalik Jerusalem". Zeitschrift des Deutschen Palästina-Vereins. 2: 135–163.
