= Lowengart =

Lowengart or Löwengart; is a surname. Notable people with the surname include:

- Assaf Lowengart, Israeli professional baseball player
- Oded Lowengart, Israeli professor of marketing
- Sally Lowengart Cohen Hellyer, American nuclear disarmament activist

== See also ==
- Loewenhardt
