= Ahva =

Ahva (Hebrew: אחווה, lit. Brotherhood) or AHVA may refer to:

- Ahva (political party), a small political party established in 1980
- Ahva, Israel, a village in southern Israel
- Ahva Academic College, a college located near the aforementioned village
- Advanced Hyper-Viewing Angle, an LCD technology

== See also ==
- Ahava (disambiguation)
