= Tall al-Turmus =

Tall al-Turmus تل الترمس Tell at-Turmus
- Etymology: "The mound of the lupine"
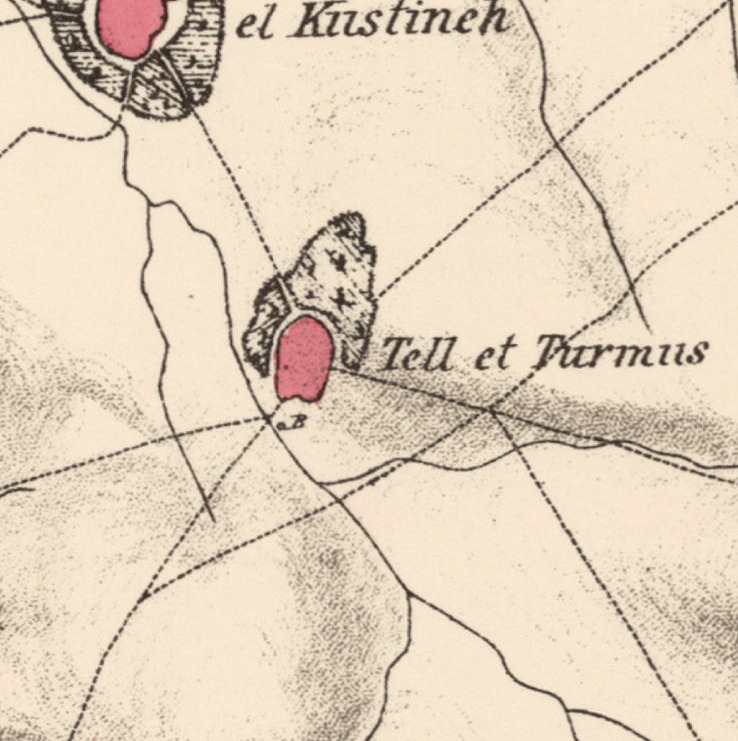
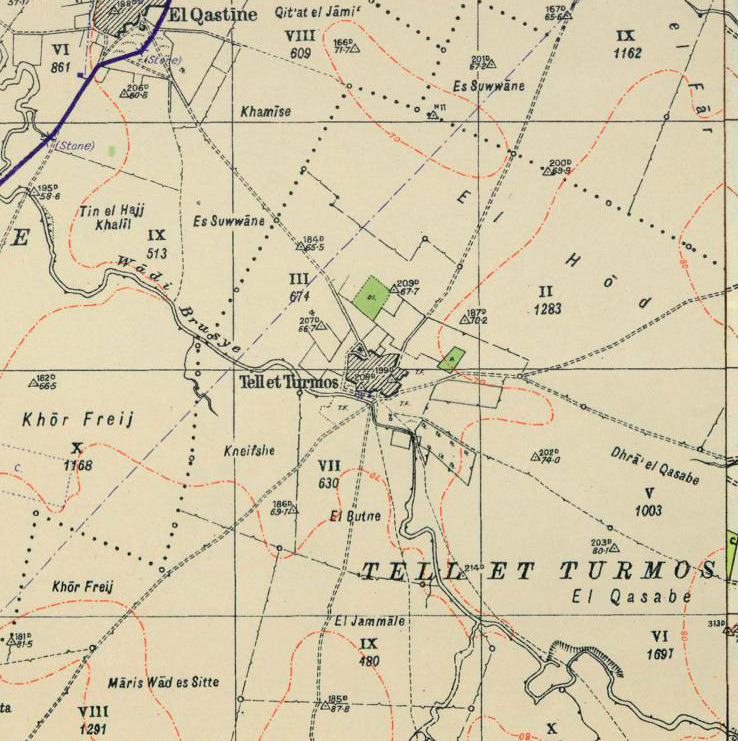
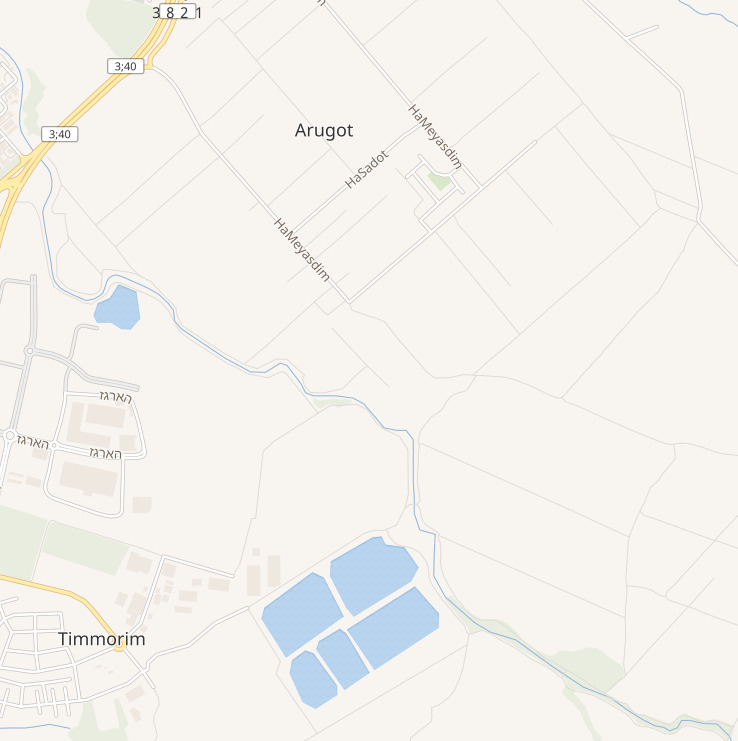
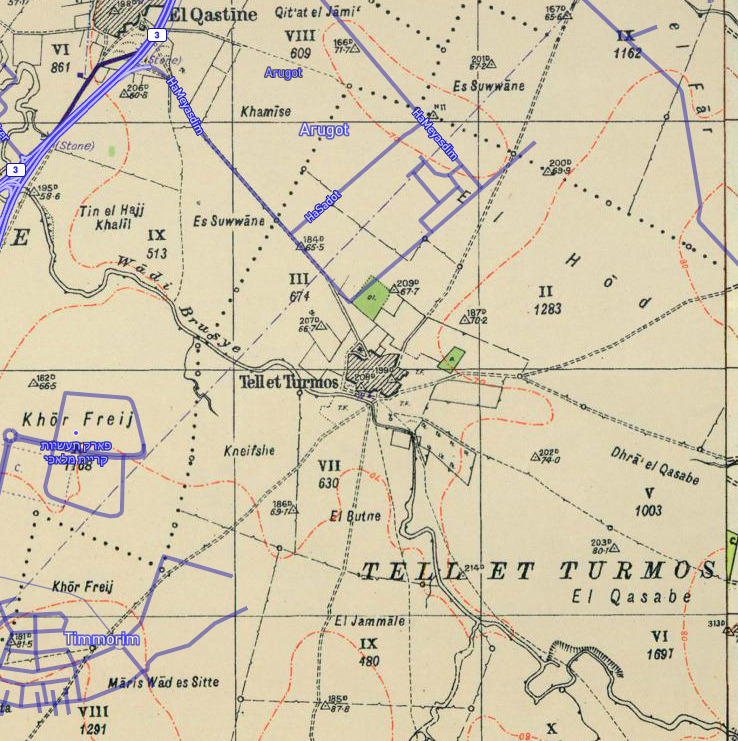
- 1870s map 1940s map modern map 1940s with modern overlay map A series of historical maps of the area around Tall al-Turmus (click the buttons)

- Location within Mandatory Palestine
- Coordinates: 31°43′33″N 34°46′22″E
- Palestine grid: 128/125
- Geopolitical entity: Mandatory Palestine
- Subdistrict: Gaza
- Date of depopulation: July, 1948

Area
  - Total: 11,508 dunams (11.508 km^{2}; 4.443 sq mi)

Population (1945)
  - Total: 760
- Cause(s) of depopulation: Fear of being caught up in the fighting
- Current Localities: Timorim

Tall al-Turmus (Arabic: تل الترمس) was a Palestinian Arab village in the Gaza Subdistrict, located on a low hill on the coastal plain of Palestine, 38 kilometers (24 mi) northeast of Gaza. In 1945, it had a population of 760 and a land area of 11,508 dunams. The village was depopulated during the 1948 Arab-Israeli War.

== History ==
In 1838, Edward Robinson saw Tall al-Turmus located northwest of Tell es-Safi, where he was staying. He further noted that the name meant "Hill of lupines".

In 1863 the French explorer Victor Guérin visited the village, where he found about 100 houses. The villagers had a very deep well, and used animals to draw water from it. An Ottoman village list of about 1870 counted 17 houses and a population of 34, though the population count included men only.

=== British Mandate era ===
In the 1922 census of Palestine conducted by the British Mandate authorities, Tall al-Turnus had a population of 384 inhabitants, all Muslims, increasing in the 1931 census, to 504 Muslims in 136 houses.

In the 1945 statistics the population of Tell et Turmus consisted of 760, all Muslims, and the total land area was 11,508 dunams, according to an official land and population survey. Of this, 154 dunams were used for citrus and bananas, 627 for plantations and irrigable land, 10,403 for cereals, while 35 dunams were built-up areas.

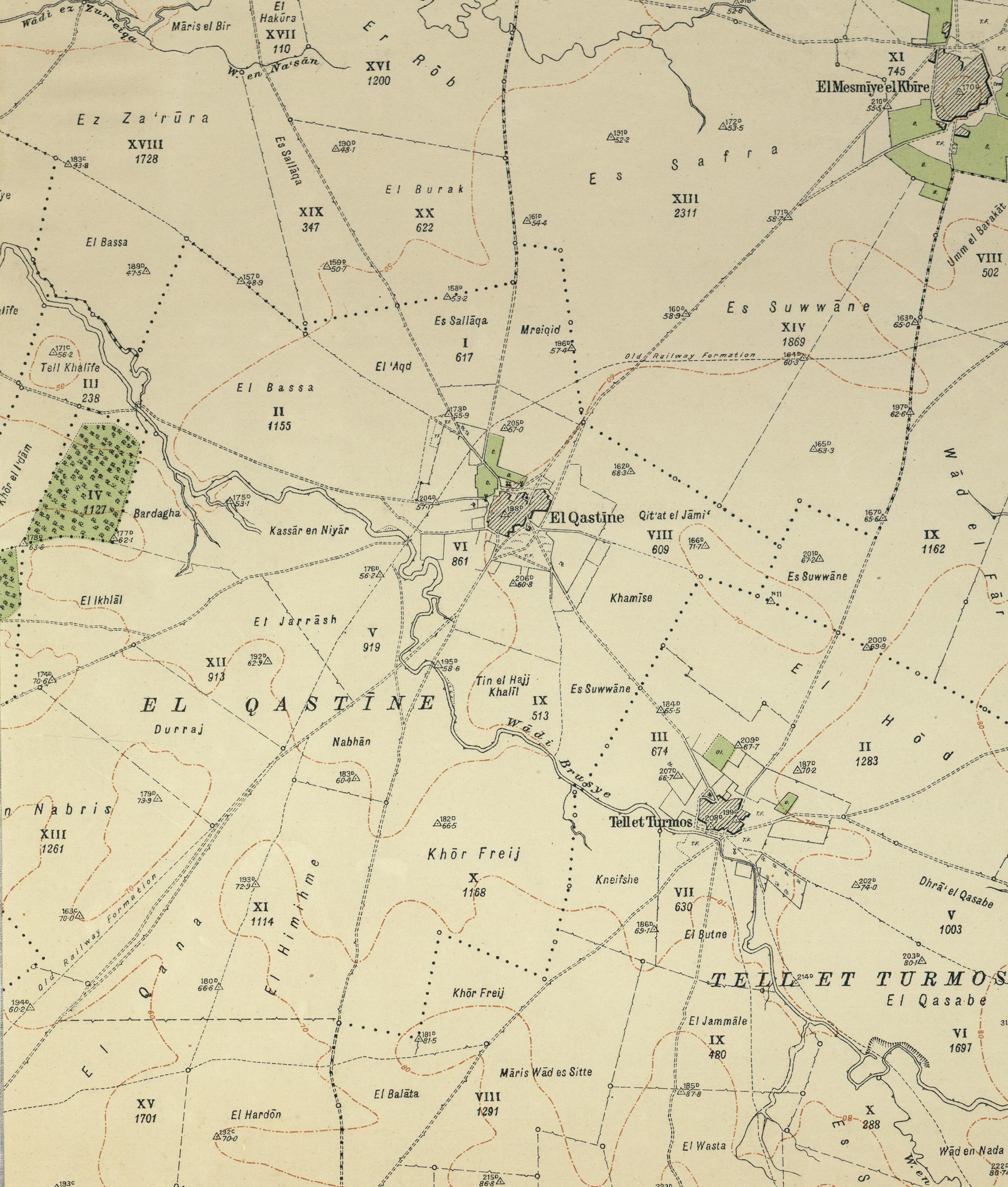
Tall al-Turnus 1930 1:20,000

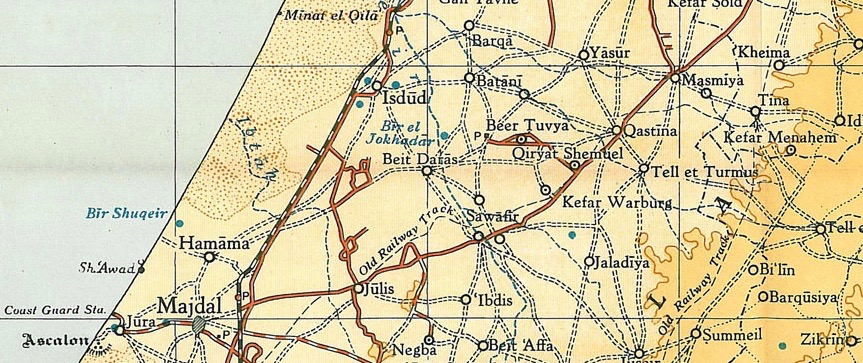
Tall al-Turnus 1945 1:250,000

The villagers constructed their houses of adobe, building them first on the hill and later expanding the village site eastward and westward. It shared a school with the neighboring village of Qastina, and the school had 160 pupils by the mid-1940s. Agriculture was the mainstay of the economy.

=== 1948, and aftermath ===
Israeli forces from the First Battalion of the Givati Brigade captured Tall al-Turmus early in Operation An-Far on July 9–10, 1948. During this operation, the inhabitants of the village were among a minority of Palestinian villagers in the area to have been driven from their village towards the Gaza Strip rather than eastwards towards Hebron. Following the war the area was incorporated into the State of Israel and the moshav of Timorim was established the lands of Tall at-Turmus in 1954.

The Israeli settlement of Arugot is close by, but on the land of Qastina, not Tall al-Turmus.

In 1992 the village site was described:"The debris of the houses are strewn over the site and can be found near the clumps of cactuses and the sycamore and eucalyptus trees that grow there."

== Archaeology ==
A salvage excavation at Tell Turmus was conducted by the Israel Antiquities Authority in April 2000 prior to the installation of a water pipe. The remains of a pear-shaped hearth were uncovered, surrounded by pieces of burnt clay that probably used to line the hearth. Inside were two pottery vessels containing burnt animal bones, organic material and a bone implement embedded with stone blades probably used as a sickle. The hearth may date to the Chalcolithic period or Early Bronze Age. Two fragments of a Chalcolithic incised scapula were found at Tall al-Turmus.

== Bibliography ==
- Barron, J.B., ed. (1923). Palestine: Report and General Abstracts of the Census of 1922. Government of Palestine.
- Government of Palestine, Department of Statistics (1945). Village Statistics, April, 1945.
- Guérin, V. (1869). Description Géographique Historique et Archéologique de la Palestine (in French). Vol. 1: Judee, pt. 2. Paris: L'Imprimerie Nationale.
- Hadawi, S. (1970). Village Statistics of 1945: A Classification of Land and Area ownership in Palestine. Palestine Liberation Organization Research Center.
- Hartmann, M. (1883). "Die Ortschaftenliste des Liwa Jerusalem in dem türkischen Staatskalender für Syrien auf das Jahr 1288 der Flucht (1871)". Zeitschrift des Deutschen Palästina-Vereins. 6: 102–149.
- Khalidi, W. (1992). All That Remains: The Palestinian Villages Occupied and Depopulated by Israel in 1948. Washington D.C.: Institute for Palestine Studies. ISBN 0-88728-224-5.
- Mills, E., ed. (1932). Census of Palestine 1931. Population of Villages, Towns and Administrative Areas. Jerusalem: Government of Palestine.
- Morris, B. (2004). The Birth of the Palestinian Refugee Problem Revisited. Cambridge University Press. ISBN 978-0-521-00967-6.
- Palmer, E.H. (1881). The Survey of Western Palestine: Arabic and English Name Lists Collected During the Survey by Lieutenants Conder and Kitchener, R. E. Transliterated and Explained by E.H. Palmer. Committee of the Palestine Exploration Fund.
- Robinson, E.; Smith, E. (1841). Biblical Researches in Palestine, Mount Sinai and Arabia Petraea: A Journal of Travels in the year 1838. Vol. 2. Boston: Crocker & Brewster.
- Robinson, E.; Smith, E. (1841). Biblical Researches in Palestine, Mount Sinai and Arabia Petraea: A Journal of Travels in the year 1838. Vol. 3. Boston: Crocker & Brewster.
- Socin, A. (1879). "Alphabetisches Verzeichniss von Ortschaften des Paschalik Jerusalem". Zeitschrift des Deutschen Palästina-Vereins. 2: 135–163.
- Zelin, Alexey (2004-06-09). "Tell et-Turmus Final Report" (116). Hadashot Arkheologiyot – Excavations and Surveys in Israel.
