= Ahva, Israel =

Village in southern Israel

Ahva: אַחֲוָה, אחווה (Hebrew)

Hebrew transcription(s)
  - Official: Ahawa
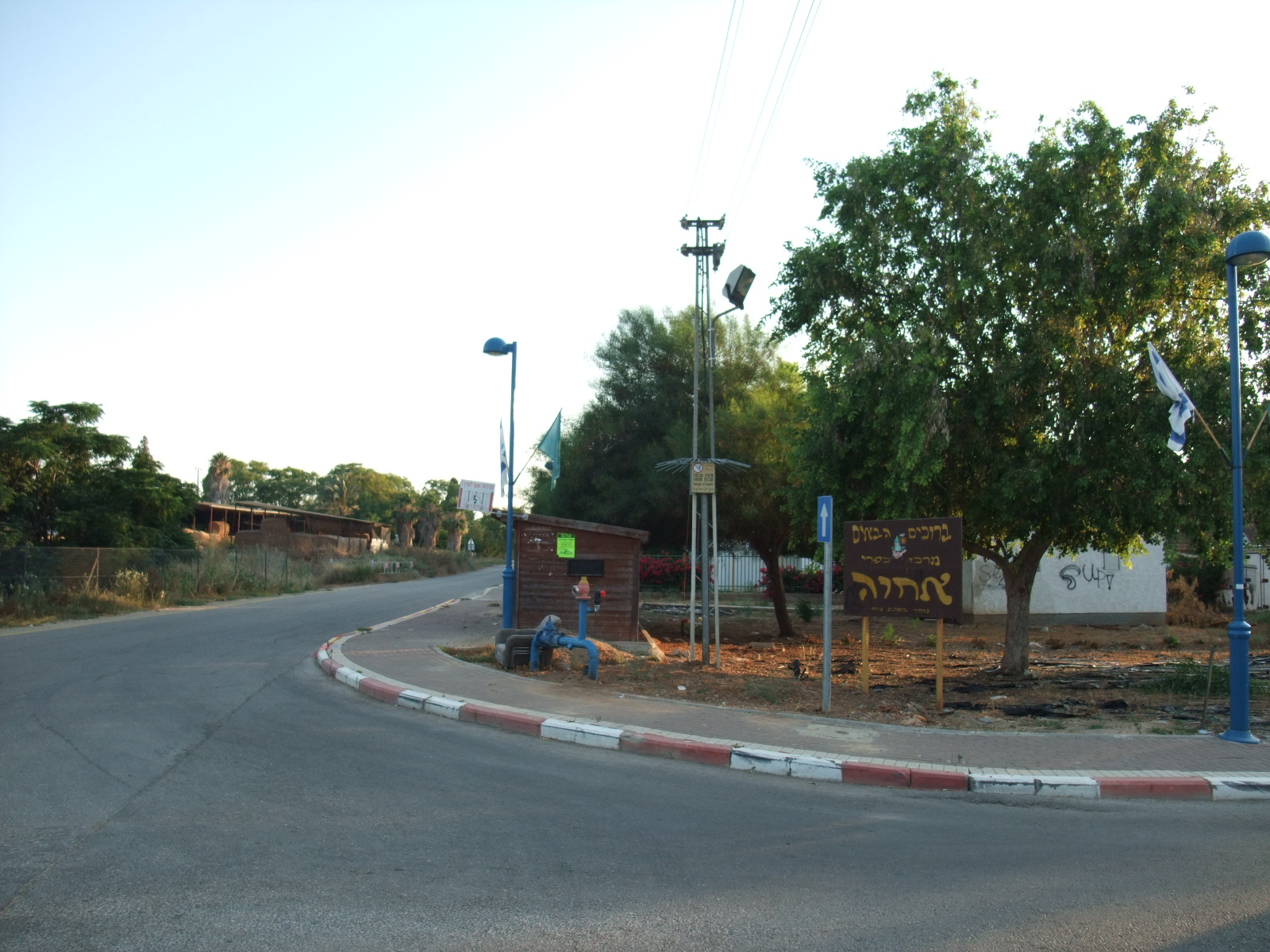
- Etymology: Brotherhood
- Location within Ashkelon region of Israel Location within Israel
- Coordinates: 31°44′36″N 34°46′9″E
- Country: Israel
- District: Southern
- Subdistrict: Ashkelon
- Council: Be'er Tuvia
- Founded: 1974
- Population (2024): 384

Ahva (Hebrew: אַחֲוָה, lit. 'Brotherhood') is a village in the northern Negev desert of southern Israel. It falls under the jurisdiction of Be'er Tuvia Regional Council and had a population of 384 in 2024. It is adjacent to the Ahva Academic College and acts as a service center for the surrounding settlements, including Kfar Ahim, Kfar HaRif, Talmei Yehiel and Yenon.

== History ==
The village was established in 1976 for civil servants of the regional council. It is located on the land of the depopulated Palestinian village of Al-Masmiyya al-Kabira.
