= Ahava (disambiguation) =

Ahava, in Hebrew love, may indicate:

- Ahava Dead Sea Laboratories, an Israeli cosmetics company with headquarters in Lod
- Ahava rabbah, a prayer and blessing that is recited by followers of Ashkenazi Judaism during Shacharit
- Ahava Raba, blessing recited before the Shema
- Ahava (Bible), name of a biblical canal or river mentioned in the Book of Ezra
- Ahva, Israel, a village in Israel
- Ahava (crater), a crater on Venus

== See also ==
- Achawa (disambiguation)
- Ahva (disambiguation)
