= Aviva Rabinovich =

Israeli botanist and environmentalist (1927–2007)

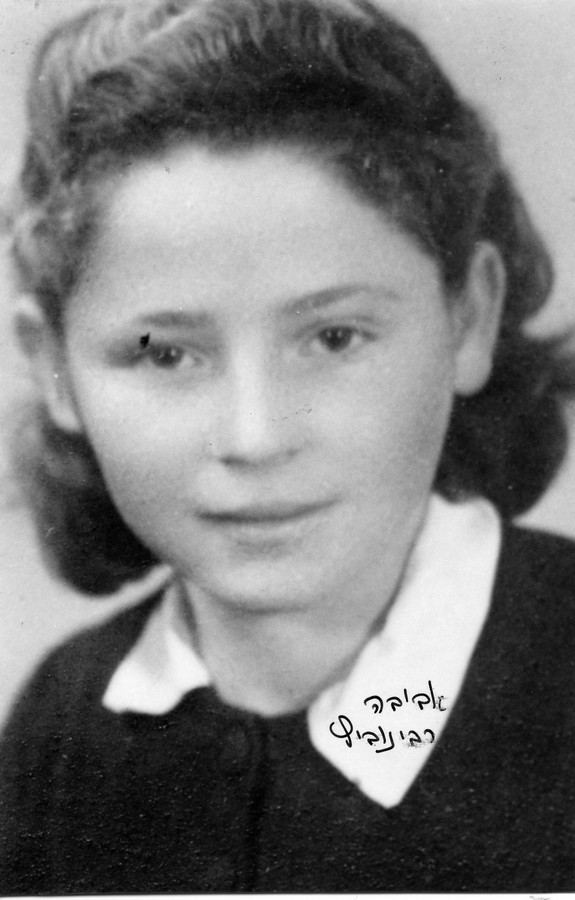
Aviva Rabinovich in her youth

Aviva Rabinovich-Vin (Hebrew: אביבה רבינוביץ'-וין; March 23, 1927 – July 7, 2007), better known as simply Aviva Rabinovich, was a professor of botany, chief scientist at the Israel Nature and Parks Authority (1970-1988), and an environmental activist.

== Biography ==
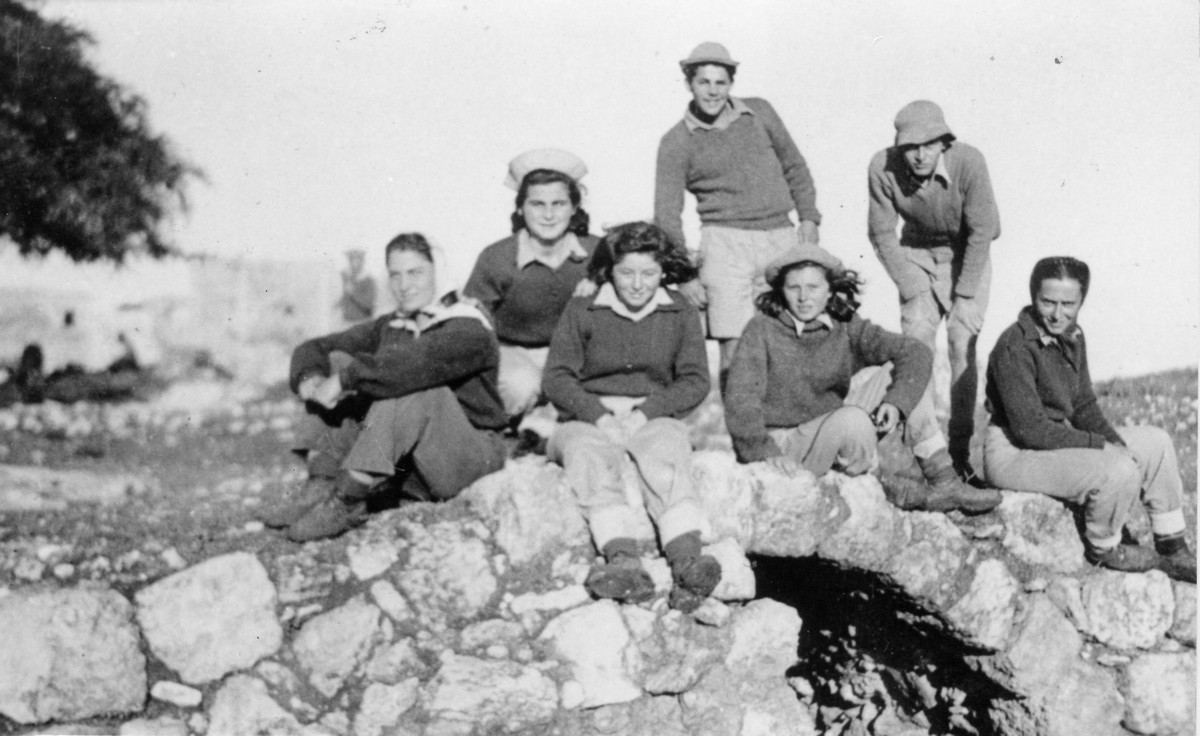
Aviva Rabinovich with her Palmach comrades

Aviva Rabinowitz, daughter of Hannah and Naftali, was born in Ein Harod, lived in Jerusalem and in Kfar Warburg, where her parents established a farm, and studied in Beer Tuvia. In 1944 she enlisted for Palmach (retired in 1949), fought in the 1948 Palestine war and was wounded in combat. (In her 1998 interview she said that the veterans, such as Ariel Sharon, Rafael Eitan, and Yitzhak Rabin "listened to her ecological ravings only because they remembered her as the only woman wounded during the War while charging the enemy position.")

Initially she was assigned a non-combatant job of secretary and communications duties in Company H, but was discharged due to her temper. She returned to the farm, but due to the invasion of Arabs she moved to Kiryat Anavim, where Palmach's Fourth Battalion was quartered and re-enlisted as a patrolwoman of Company A under Uri Ben-Ari (of what now became the Harel Brigade) and took part in all battles of the Company.

She was one of ten women interviewees in the documentary Akhyotenu giborot ha-tehila ("Our sisters, heroines of fame")

After the discharge she settled in kibbutz Kabri, together with some members of the Harel Brigade. She married Hillel Vin (Hebrew: הלל וין) and they had two children Gila and Ron. She resided there for the rest of her life.

She was buried in kibbutz Kabri.

== Professional activities ==
After the war she taught school biology, physics, and chemistry. The Hebrew University of Jerusalem allowed her to complete the graduate studies skipping the formal requirements of B.A. She did her Ph.D. work in botany under professor Michael Zohary on the interaction between rock, soin and plant communities. In 1969 she was hired by the Nature Reserves Authority and was with the agency for 27 years.

Aviva Rabinovich was an avid critic of the Jewish National Fund (JNF) for its monocultural approach to forestry, which adversely impacted the wildlife. In particular, she spearheaded a claim before the High Court of Justice against the JNF and several governmental organizations stating that they aggressively handled the areas assigned for afforestation, which resulted in severe ecological damages and she won a verdict that the prescribed activities in preparation to afforestation did cause grave damages to the ecosystem and were in violation of the law for many years. Despite the controversy, JNF placed Aviva Rabinovich on their research committee and she became a lecturer in its professional training.

When Aviva Rabinovich was appointed head of a newly created scientific department of NRA, she established scientific criteria for the delineation of reserves and initiated the controlled-grazing initiative based on ecological principles, so that herds were allowed into the reserves to balance the flora. She established educational programs for rangers. In early 1980s she introduced computerized ecological databases. She served as NRA Chief Scientist during 1970-1988 and described by Alon Tal as "one of Israel's most provocative ecologists".

== Literature ==
- Alon Tal, Pollution in a Promised Land: An Environmental History of Israel, 2002, ISBN 0520234286
