= Achawa =

Achawa may refer to:

- Achawa people, an ethnic group of Colombia and Venezuela
- Achawa language, a language of Colombia
- An alternative spelling of ahava (in Hebrew)
