= Hatzav =

Moshav in southern Israel

Hatzav: חָצָב (Hebrew)
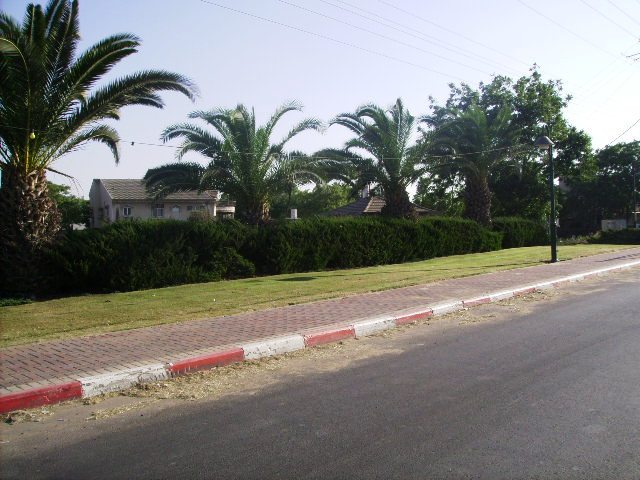

- Location within Ashkelon region of Israel
- Coordinates: 31°46′48″N 34°46′12″E
- Country: Israel
- District: Southern
- Subdistrict: Ashkelon
- Council: Be'er Tuvia
- Affiliation: Moshavim Movement
- Founded: 1949
- Founder: Libyan Jewish refugees
- Area: 3,200 dunams (3.2 km^{2}; 1.2 sq mi)
- Population (2024): 1,725
  - Density: 540/km^{2} (1,400/sq mi)

Hatzav (Hebrew: חָצָב, lit. 'Squill') is a moshav in central Israel. Located on Highway 40 between Gedera and Be'er Sheva, it covers 3,200 dunams and falls under the jurisdiction of Be'er Tuvia Regional Council. In 2024 it had a population of 1,725.

== History ==
The moshav was founded in 1949 by refugees from Tripoli in Libya, including Ben-Zion Halfon, later a member of the Knesset. It was established on the lands of the depopulated Palestinian village of Al-Masmiyya al-Kabira.
