= Timorim =

Moshav in southern Israel

Timorim: תימורים (Hebrew)
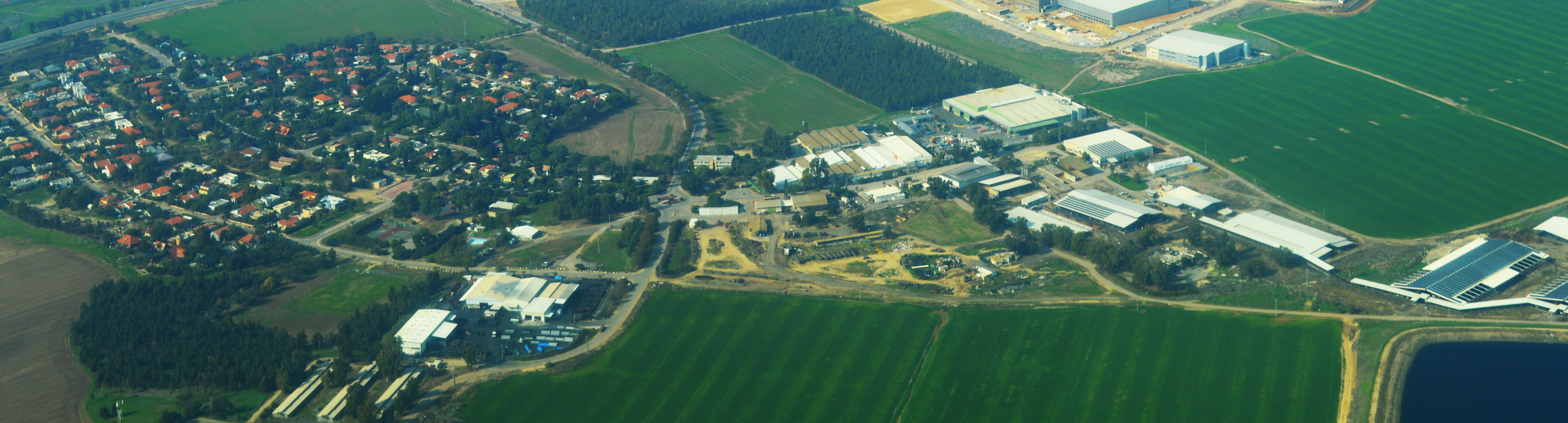

- Location within Ashkelon region of Israel
- Coordinates: 31°42′55″N 34°45′36″E
- Country: Israel
- District: Southern
- Subdistrict: Ashkelon
- Council: Be'er Tuvia
- Affiliation: HaOved HaTzioni
- Founded: 1948 (original location); 1954 (current location)
- Founder: HaNoar HaTzioni members
- Population (2024): 703
- Website: www.timorim.org

Timorim (Hebrew: תִּמּוֹרִים) is a moshav shitufi in central Israel. Located on the Israeli coastal plain around a kilometer south of the Malakhi Junction, near the town of Kiryat Malakhi, it falls under the jurisdiction of Be'er Tuvia Regional Council. In 2024 it had a population of 703.

The village also functions as a community settlement for its community of non-members

== History ==
The village was established in 1948 by a gar'in of youth from South Africa, Romania and Egypt from the youth movement HaNoar HaTzioni as a kibbutz on Shimron Hill in the Lower Galilee, in the area now covered by the community settlement of Timrat. It was named after a carving in the shape of a palm in the temple: 1 Kings 6:29.

It was built on the land of the depopulated Palestinian village of Tall al-Turmus. In 1953 it was reorganized as a moshav shitufi, one of the first in the country. In 1954 the settlement moved to its current location due to a shortage of land at its original site.

== Economy ==
Timorim's income in 2005 derived mainly from industry (74%), with additional 15% from agriculture and 11% from outside work of Timorim members and other sources. Timorim has two industries: "Tomer Plastics" manufacturing plastic furniture for the institutional market (est. 1961–1975) and "Tomer 2000" manufacturing metal pipes (est. 1978). Agriculture includes cotton, citrus, olives, and walnuts. A dairy herd of 450 head is managed jointly with Kibbutz Hulda.

== Notable residents ==
- Assaf Lowengart (born 1998), baseball player on Team Israel
- Michael Harris (born 1956), public policy scholar and universities executive
