= Bnei Re'em =

Moshav in central Israel

Bnei Re'em: בְּנֵי רְאֵ״ם (Hebrew)
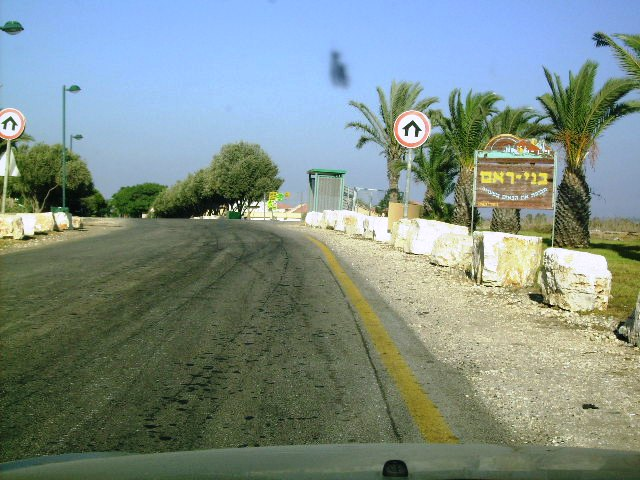

- Location within Central Israel Location within Ashkelon region of Israel Location within Israel
- Coordinates: 31°46′12″N 34°47′26″E
- Country: Israel
- District: Central
- Subdistrict: Rehovot
- Council: Nahal Sorek
- Affiliation: Poalei Agudat Yisrael
- Founded: 1949
- Founder: Eastern European immigrants and Yemenite Jewish refugees
- Population (2024): 1,359

Bnei Re'em (Hebrew: בְּנֵי רְאֵ״ם, lit. Sons of Re'em) is a religious moshav in central Israel. Located in the Shephelah, it falls under the jurisdiction of Nahal Sorek Regional Council. In 2024 it had a population of 1,359.

== Etymology ==
The moshav is named for the Gerrer Rebbe, Rabbi Avraham Mordechai Alter. "Re'em" is a Hebrew acronym.

== History ==
Bnei Re'em was established in 1949 by Jewish immigrants from Eastern Europe and Jewish refugees from Yemen on land near the depopulated Palestinian village of Al-Masmiyya al-Kabira. Until a pump was installed that worked on an automated sabbath clock, an Arab family that lived in the area served as a Sabbath Goy.
