= Mansfield Mountaineers =

Mansfield (Pennsylvania, U.S.) university sports teams

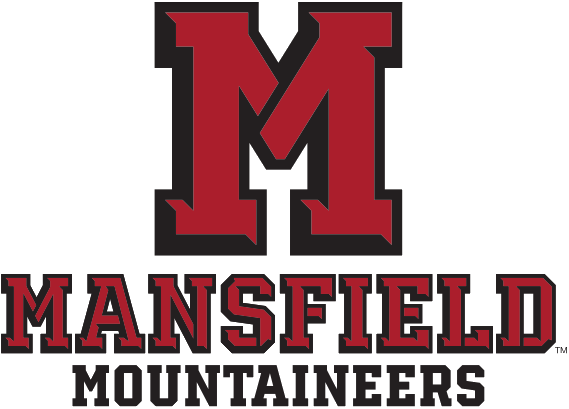
- University: Mansfield University of Pennsylvania
- Conferences: Pennsylvania State Athletic Conference (PSAC), Collegiate Sprint Football League (CSFL)
- NCAA: Division II
- Athletic director: Andrew Petko
- Location: Mansfield, Pennsylvania
- Varsity teams: 11
- Nickname: Mountaineers
- Colors: Red and black
- Website: gomounties.com
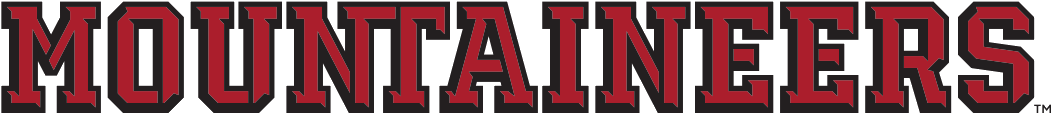

The Mansfield Mountaineers or Mounties represent the Mansfield University of Pennsylvania, located in Mansfield, Pennsylvania, in NCAA Division II intercollegiate sports.

The Mountaineers are members of the Pennsylvania State Athletic Conference (PSAC) for eleven varsity sports. Mansfield University Sprint Football team participates in the Collegiate Sprint Football League (CSFL). Mansfield have been members of the PSAC since its foundation in 1951 and a non-football member since 2007.

== Varsity teams ==
=== List of teams ===
Men's sports

- Baseball
- Basketball
- Cross country
- Sprint football
- Track and field

Women's sports

- Basketball
- Cross country
- Field hockey
- Soccer
- Softball
- Track and field

== Individual sports ==
=== Football ===
Mansfield fielded a football team dating back to 1891, but discontinued the Division II varsity football program after the 2006 season, due to budgetary shortfalls. Starting in 2008, largely through the efforts of Sports Information Director Steve McCloskey, the university began competition in the Collegiate Sprint Football League.

The first night football game of all time was played in Mansfield, Pennsylvania on September 28, 1892, between Mansfield (then called Mansfield State Normal) and Wyoming Seminary. It ended bitterly at halftime in a 0–0 tie.

In 2013, a new artificial (turf grass) playing surface and lights were installed on Karl Van Norman Field. On September 14, 2013, Mansfield played Princeton University in a CSFL game, marking a return to night football in Mansfield after a 121-year absence. Mansfield defeated Princeton 24–14 in front of a record crowd of 6,223 fans at Van Norman Field.

== Notable players ==
- Assaf Lowengart (born 1998), baseball player on Team Israel
