= Ben-Zion Halfon =

Israeli politician (1930–1977)

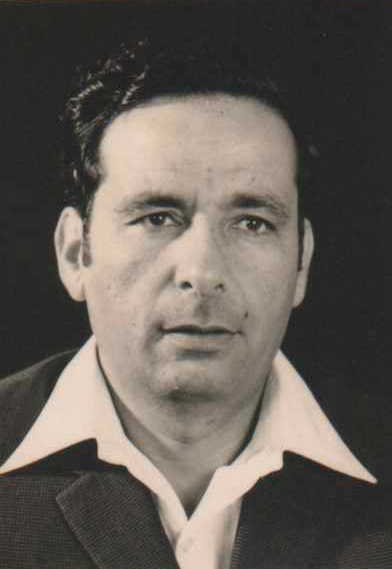
- Halfon during his time in the Knesset

Faction represented in the Knesset
- 1969–1977: Alignment

Personal details
- Born: 1930 Tripoli, Libya
- Died: 21 September 1977 (aged 47) Gedera, Israel

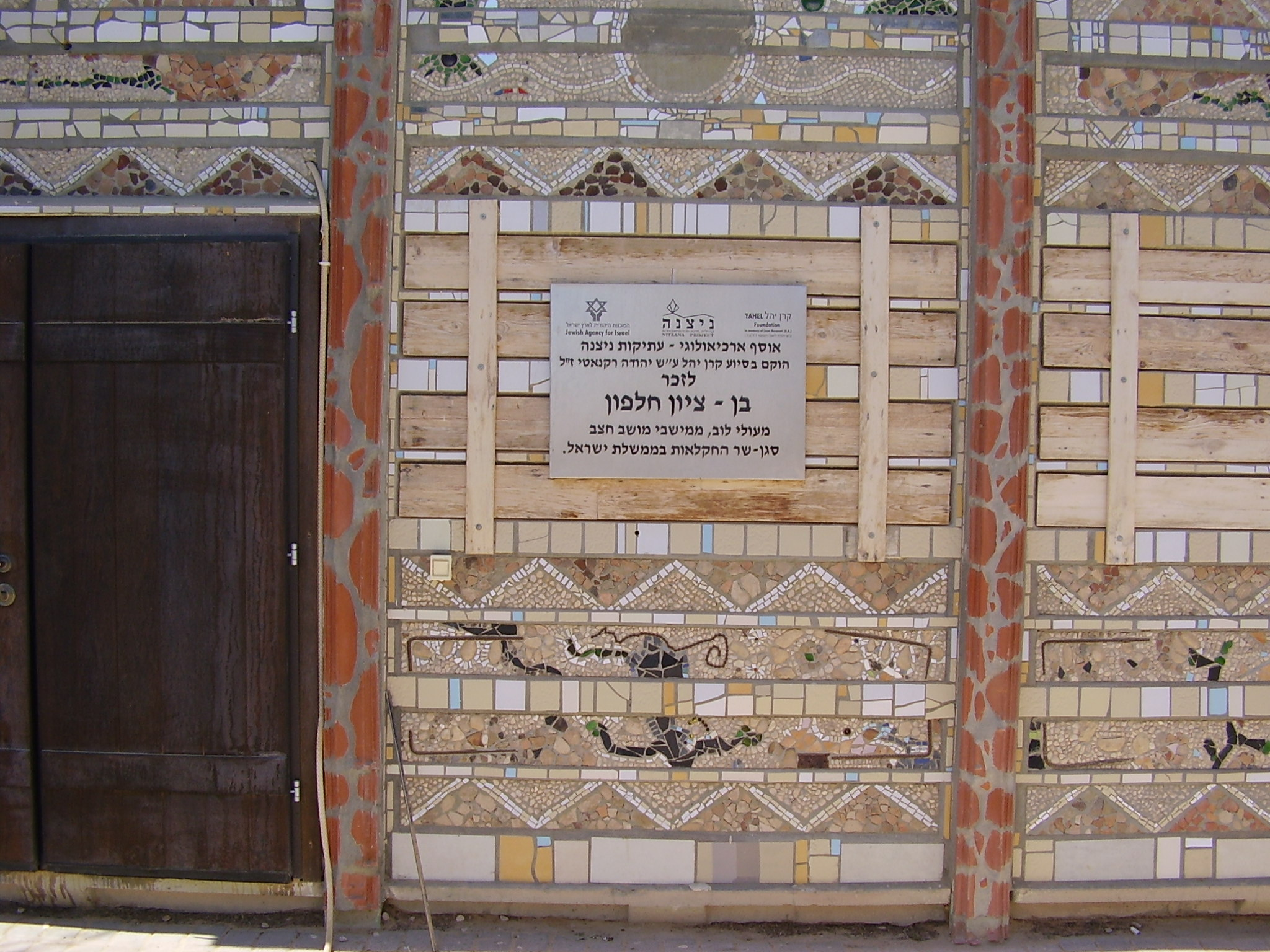
The Archaeological Museum in Nitzana named after Halfon

Ben-Zion Halfon (Hebrew: בן-ציון חלפון; 1930 – 21 September 1977) was an Israeli politician who served as a member of the Knesset for the Alignment between 1969 and 1977.

== Biography ==
Born in Tripoli in Libya in 1930, Halfon was a member of a Zionist youth movement. In 1947 he attempted to emigrate to Mandatory Palestine via Italy, aboard the Aliyah Bet ship Medinat HaYehudim. However, he was detained by the British authorities and sent to an internment camp in Cyprus. The following year he reached Israel, and joined the Palmach's Yiftach Brigade, with whom he fought in the 1948 Arab-Israeli War.

He was involved in helping other Libyan Jews who had made aliyah, and in 1949 he was amongst the founders of moshav Hatzav. He became involved in the Southern branch of the Moshavim Movement, and became the movement's representative in the Labor Party. He served as national co-ordinator of the movement's purchasing organisation and on the board of the Agricultural Bank.

In 1969 he was elected to the Knesset on the Alignment list (an alliance of the Labor Party and Mapam), and was appointed Deputy Minister of Agriculture on 22 December that year. He was re-elected in 1973 but lost his portfolio. He lost his seat in the May 1977 elections, and died in a traffic collision near Gedera junction a few months later aged 47.

In 2006, the archaeological museum in Nitzana, Israel was named after him.
