= Kfar Ahim =

Moshav in southern Israel

Kfar Ahim: כְּפַר אַחִים (Hebrew)
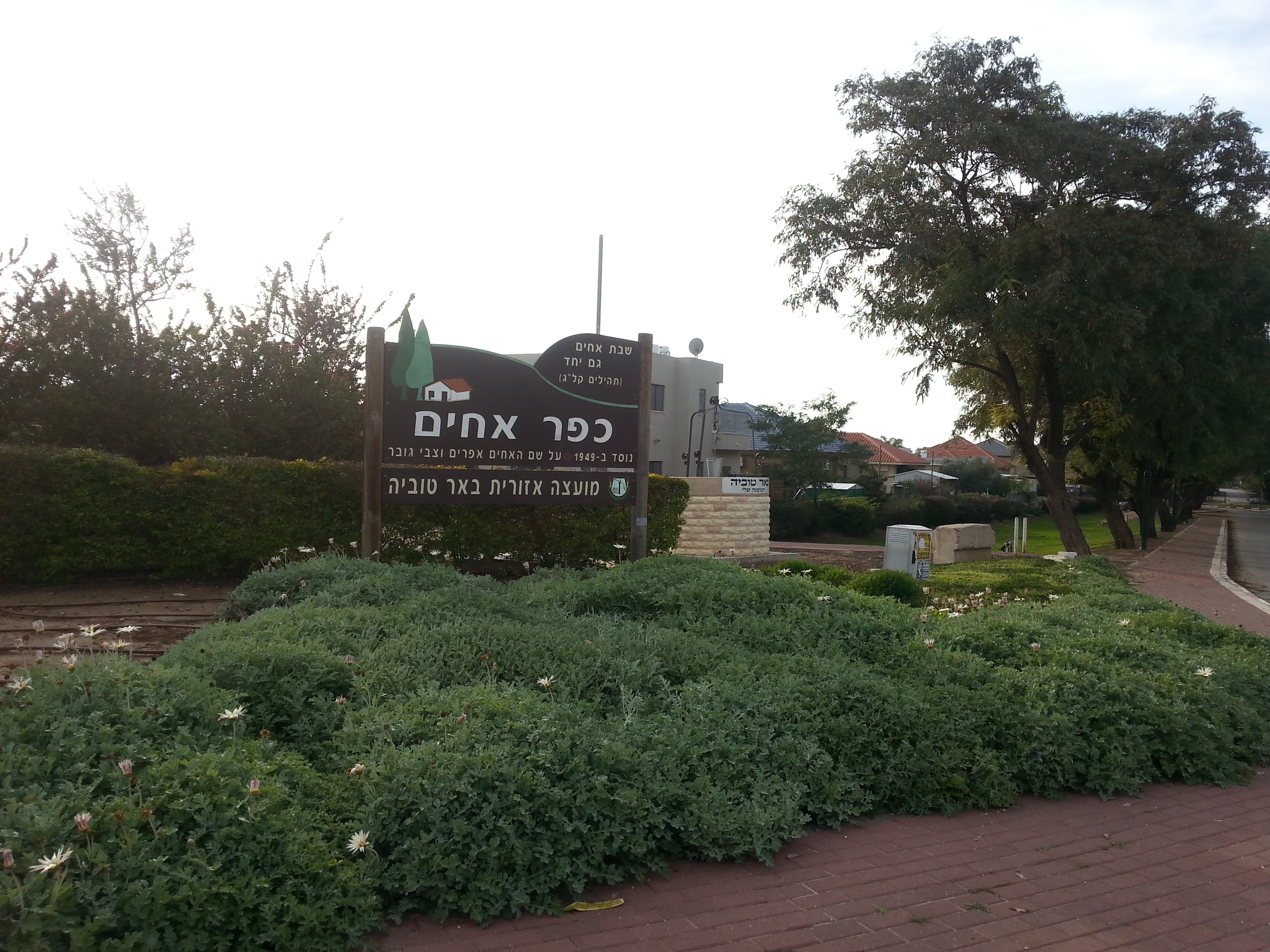
- Etymology: Village of Brothers
- Location within Ashkelon region of Israel Location within Israel
- Coordinates: 31°44′41″N 34°45′27″E
- Country: Israel
- District: Southern
- Subdistrict: Ashkelon
- Council: Be'er Tuvia
- Affiliation: Moshavim Movement
- Founded: 1949
- Founder: Polish and Romanian immigrants
- Population (2024): 794

Kfar Ahim (Hebrew: כְּפַר אַחִים, lit. 'Village of Brothers') is a moshav in south-central Israel. Located near Kiryat Malakhi, it falls under the jurisdiction of Be'er Tuvia Regional Council. In 2024 it had a population of 794.

== History ==
The moshav was founded in 1949 by Jewish immigrants from Poland and Romania, on the land of the depopulated Palestinian village of Qastina. It was named for two brothers who were killed during the 1948 Arab–Israeli War, Zvi and Efraim Guber, sons of Mordecai and Rivka Guber from the nearby moshav of Kfar Warburg.

Notable natives of Kfar Ahim include politicians Benny Gantz and Israel Katz.
