= Arugot =

Moshav in southern Israel

Arugot: ערוגות (Hebrew)
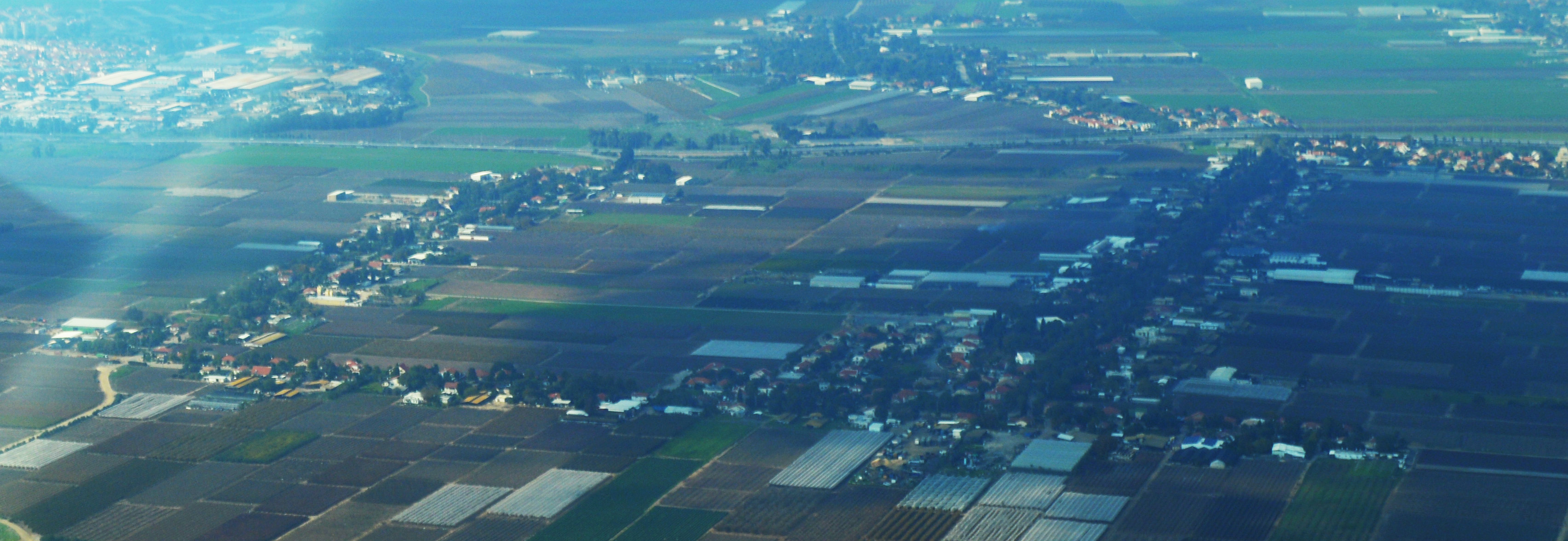

- Location within Ashkelon region of Israel
- Coordinates: 31°44′5″N 34°46′15″E
- Country: Israel
- District: Southern
- Subdistrict: Ashkelon
- Council: Be'er Tuvia Regional Council
- Affiliation: Moshavim Movement
- Founded: 1949
- Founder: Polish and Romanian Jews
- Population (2024): 1,243

Arugot (Hebrew: עֲרוּגוֹת, lit. 'garden terraces or beds'), is a moshav in southern Israel. Located near Kiryat Malakhi, it falls under the jurisdiction of Be'er Tuvia Regional Council. In 2024 its population was 1,243.

== History ==
The moshav was founded in 1949 by Jewish immigrants from Poland and Romania, on the land of the depopulated Palestinian village of Qastina. Its name was taken from the Book of Ezekiel 17:7.

Economy

Agriculture in Moshav Arugot today is mainly based on table grapes and other fruits.

In the center of the moshav there is a commemorative monument to the victims of Arugot who fell in Israel's battles, and in its eastern agricultural areas.
