= Oded Lowengart =

Oded Lowengart עודד לוונגרט
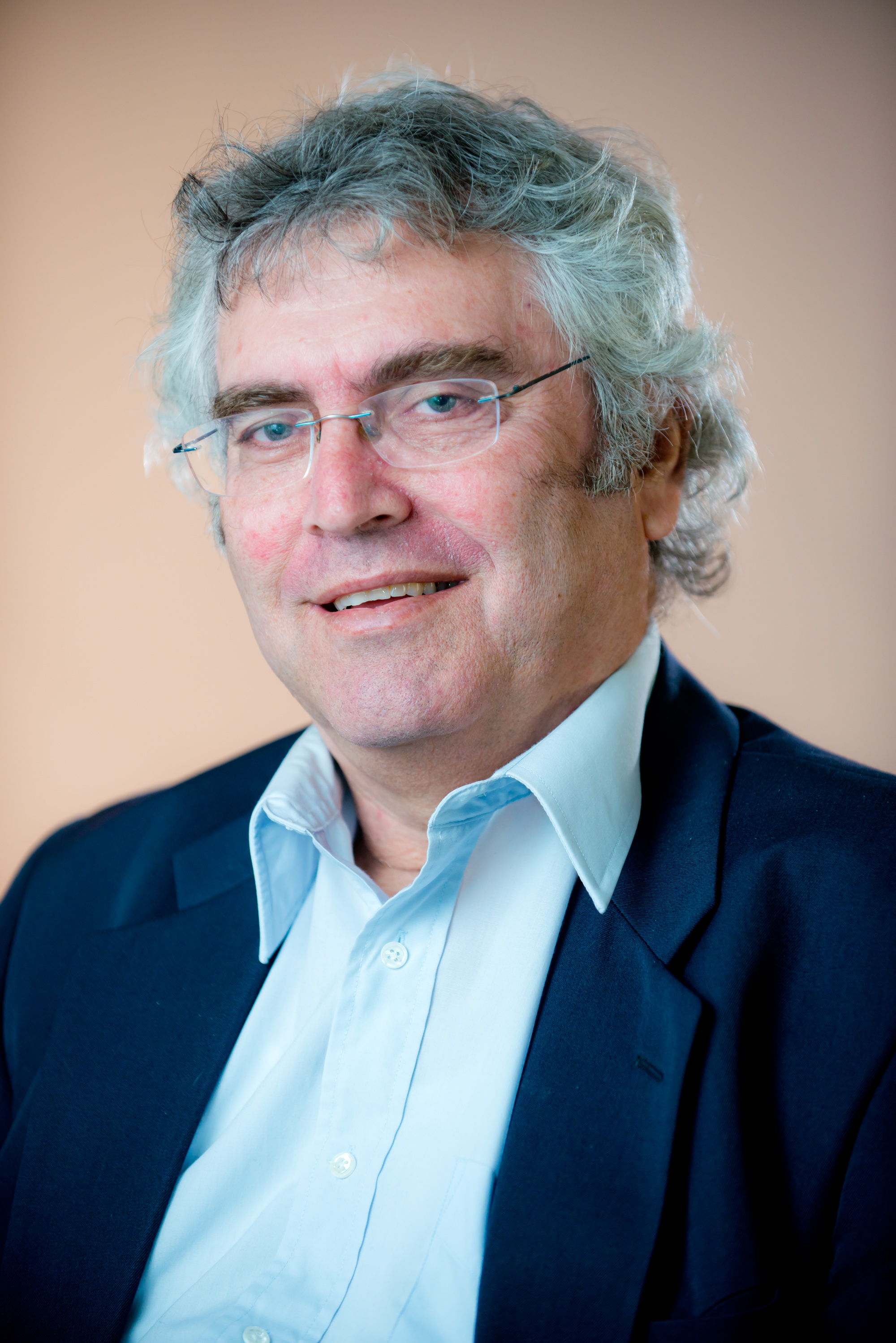
- Education: University of Wisconsin–Milwaukee
- Children: Assaf Lowengart (son)
- Scientific career
- Fields: Marketing
- Workplaces: Ben-Gurion University of the Negev
- Website: in.bgu.ac.il/en/fom/BusinessDep/

Oded Lowengart (Hebrew: עודד לוונגרט) is Professor of Marketing at the Ben-Gurion University of the Negev (BGU) in Israel, where he holds the Ernest Scheller Jr. Chair in Innovative Management and is Head of the Department of Business Administration. His two terms as Dean of the Guilford Glazer Faculty of Business and Management (2013–18) saw to opening the International MBA Program, expanded global programs, and increased Journal Citation Reports-ranked research publications.

== Education ==
Lowengart holds a PhD from the University of Wisconsin–Milwaukee.

== Research ==
Lowengart's areas of interest include modeling consumer perceptions and consumer choice, market share forecasting and diagnostics. His research in 2008 focused on modeling issues in areas such as consumers' food and fast food product choice, the effect of information and its intensity on choice processes, consumer heterogeneity, reference price, and network and social marketing.

His research on pricing aims to understand and analyze the differential effect of price expectations on consumers' choice and optimal pricing policies. His research in information and food choices examines theoretically and empirically the effect of negative and calorie types of information on fast food selection, as well as the overall phenomenon of obesity. Current research projects also involve modeling social personal branding and its effect on pro-social behavior.

== Personal life ==
He is married to Ayelet Lowengart, and his son Assaf Lowengart is an Olympic baseball player.
