= Al-Masmiyya al-Saghira =

al-Masmiyya al-Saghira المسمية الصغيرة Masmiyyat al-Hurani al-Huraniyya
- Village
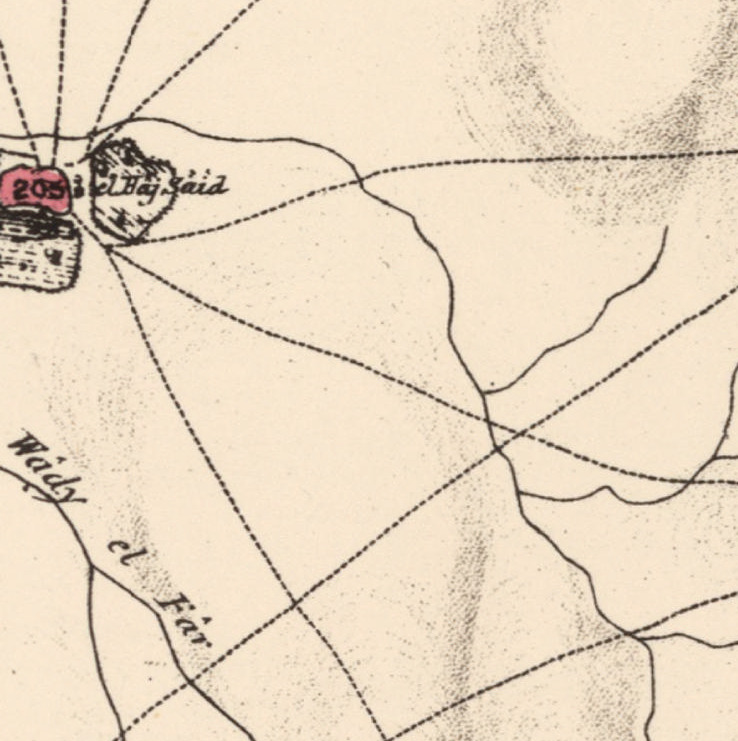
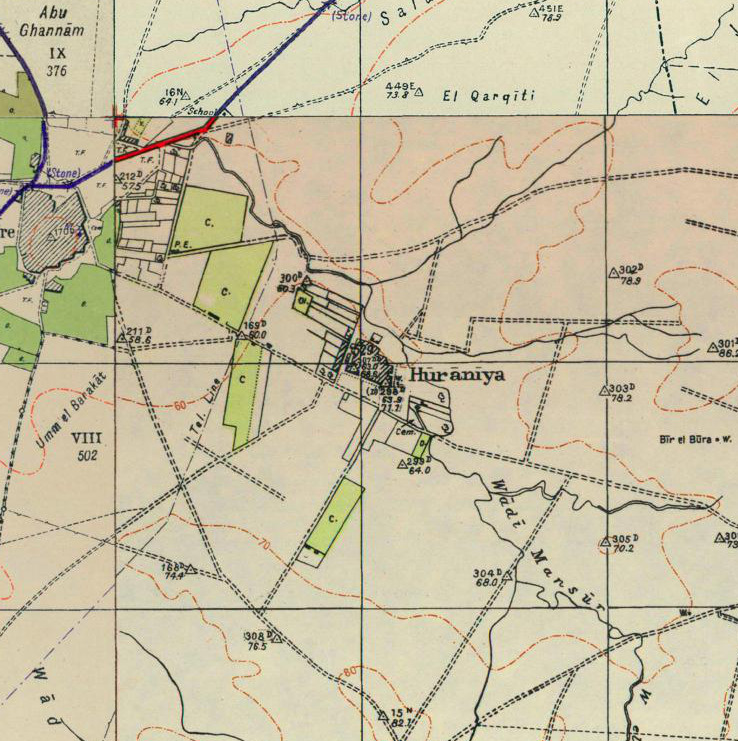
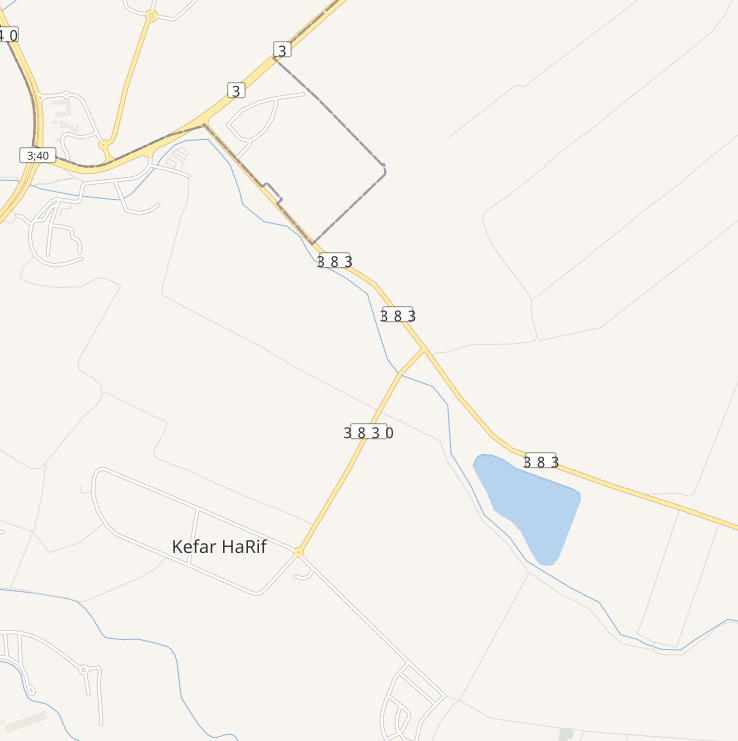
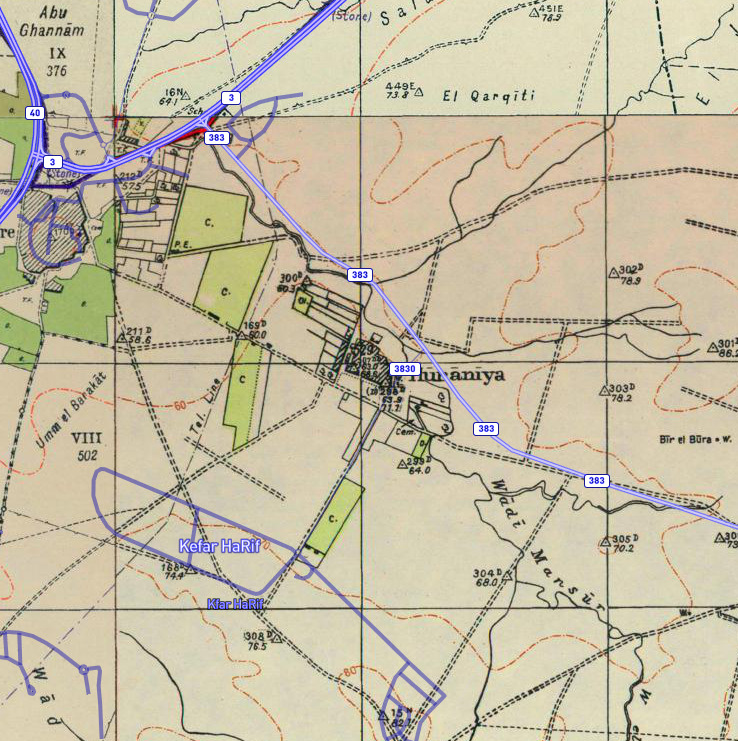
- 1870s map 1940s map modern map 1940s with modern overlay map A series of historical maps of the area around Al-Masmiyya al-Saghira (click the buttons)

- Location within Mandatory Palestine
- Coordinates: 31°45′10″N 34°47′56″E
- Palestine grid: 131/128
- Geopolitical entity: Mandatory Palestine
- Subdistrict: Gaza
- Date of depopulation: July 8–9, 1948

Area
  - Total: 6,478 dunams (6.478 km^{2}; 2.501 sq mi)

Population (1945)
  - Total: 530
- Cause(s) of depopulation: Military assault by Yishuv forces
- Current Localities: Masmiya Bet, Kfar HaRif

Al-Masmiyya al-Saghira (Arabic: المسمية الصغيرة), also known as Mamsiyyat al-Hurani and al-Huraniyya, was a Palestinian Arab village in the Gaza Subdistrict, located 42 kilometers (26 mi) northeast of Gaza. It was situated at an elevation of 60 meters (200 ft) in the southern coastal plain of Ottoman Syria.

Established in the late 19th century by locals from its twin Al-Masmiyya al-Kabira, Hamula clan of Al-Hurani, following feuds with other residents. Al-Masmiyya al-Saghira was depopulated during the 1948 Arab-Israeli War, but prior to that, in 1945, it had a population of 530 inhabitants.

== History ==
Al-Masmiyya al-Saghira was established in the second half of the 19th century by al-Hurani clan who had lived in the adjacent al-Masmiyya al-Kabira, but left because of feuds with other residents. Thus, the village was also known as "Masmiyyat al-Hurani". The adjectival Saghira means "minor" in Arabic and was used to differentiate it from al-Mamsiyya al-Kabira, the latter word meaning "major".

=== British Mandate era ===
In the 1922 census of Palestine conducted by the British Mandate authorities, Mesmiyet Saghira had a population of 261 inhabitants, all Muslims, increasing in the 1931 census when Masmiya El Saghira had an all-Muslim population of 354 in 73 houses.

In the 1945 statistics the population of El Masmiya es Sagira was 530 Muslims, while the total land area was 6,478 dunams, according to an official land and population survey. Of this, a total of 147 dunams were used for citrus and bananas, 7 for plantations and irrigable land, 6,126 for cereals, while 18 dunams were built-up areas.

Seven small shops provided the village with its basic needs and children attended school in al-Masmiyya al-Kabira. Agriculture was the mainstay of the economy, grain being the dominant crop. In addition to cultivation, the inhabitants raised livestock which numbered approximately 4,000 animals, including sheep, goats, cattle, camels, mules. Farmers participated in the weekly market of al-Faluja, and also sold their products in the cities of Gaza, al-Majdal (Ashkelon), and Jaffa.

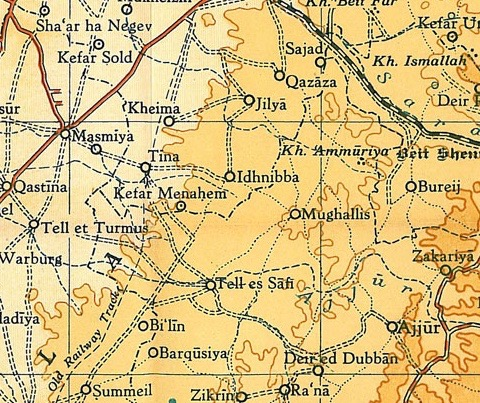
Masmiya (Al-Masmiyya al-Saghira) 1945 1:250,000

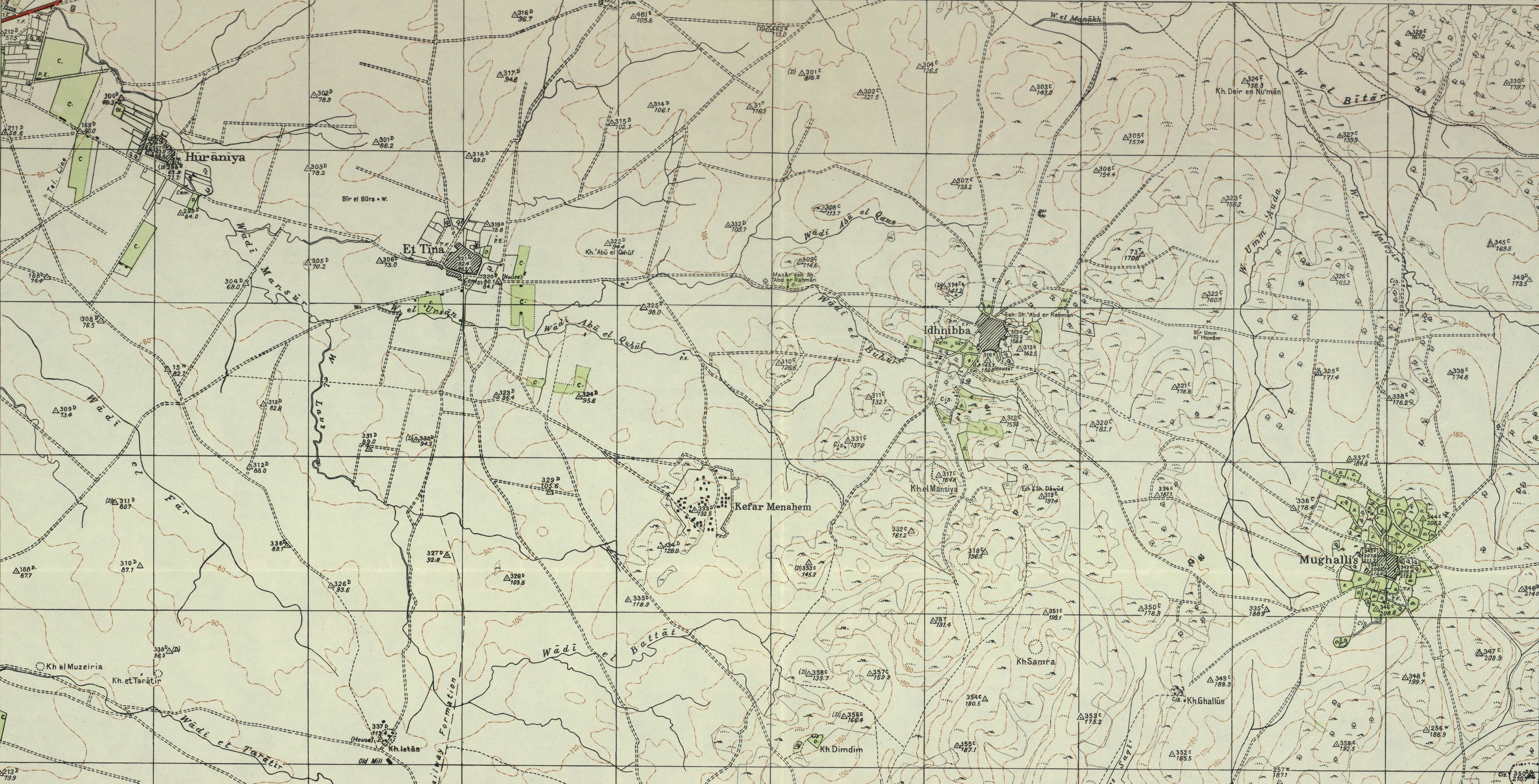
Huraniya (Al-Masmiyya al-Saghira) 1948 1:20,000

=== 1948 and aftermath ===
The circumstances of al-Masmiyya al-Saghira's capture by Israel was identical to those of its sister village, al-Masmiyya al-Kabira which was occupied by the Givati Brigade on July 8–9, 1948. Israeli historian Benny Morris writes that the military operation was undertaken occurred in the ten days between the first two truces of the 1948 Arab-Israeli War and that it "precipitated the evacuation of the village". Following the war the area was incorporated into the State of Israel and the moshav of Kfar HaRif was established on al-Masmiyya al-Saghira's lands in 1956. According to Walid Khalidi: "Virtually no trace of the village remains, and the site is overgrown with weeds, tall grasses, and a scattering of eucalyptus trees".

== See also ==
- Depopulated Palestinian locations in Israel

== Bibliography ==
- Barron, J.B., ed. (1923). Palestine: Report and General Abstracts of the Census of 1922. Government of Palestine.
- Government of Palestine, Department of Statistics (1945). Village Statistics, April, 1945.
- Hadawi, S. (1970). Village Statistics of 1945: A Classification of Land and Area ownership in Palestine. Palestine Liberation Organization Research Center. Archived from the original on 2018-12-08.
- Khalidi, W. (1992). All That Remains: The Palestinian Villages Occupied and Depopulated by Israel in 1948. Washington D.C.: Institute for Palestine Studies. ISBN 0-88728-224-5.
- Mills, E., ed. (1932). Census of Palestine 1931. Population of Villages, Towns and Administrative Areas. Jerusalem: Government of Palestine.
- Morris, B. (2004). The Birth of the Palestinian Refugee Problem Revisited. Cambridge University Press. ISBN 978-0-521-00967-6.
