= Yinon =

Moshav in southern Israel

Yinon: ינון (Hebrew)
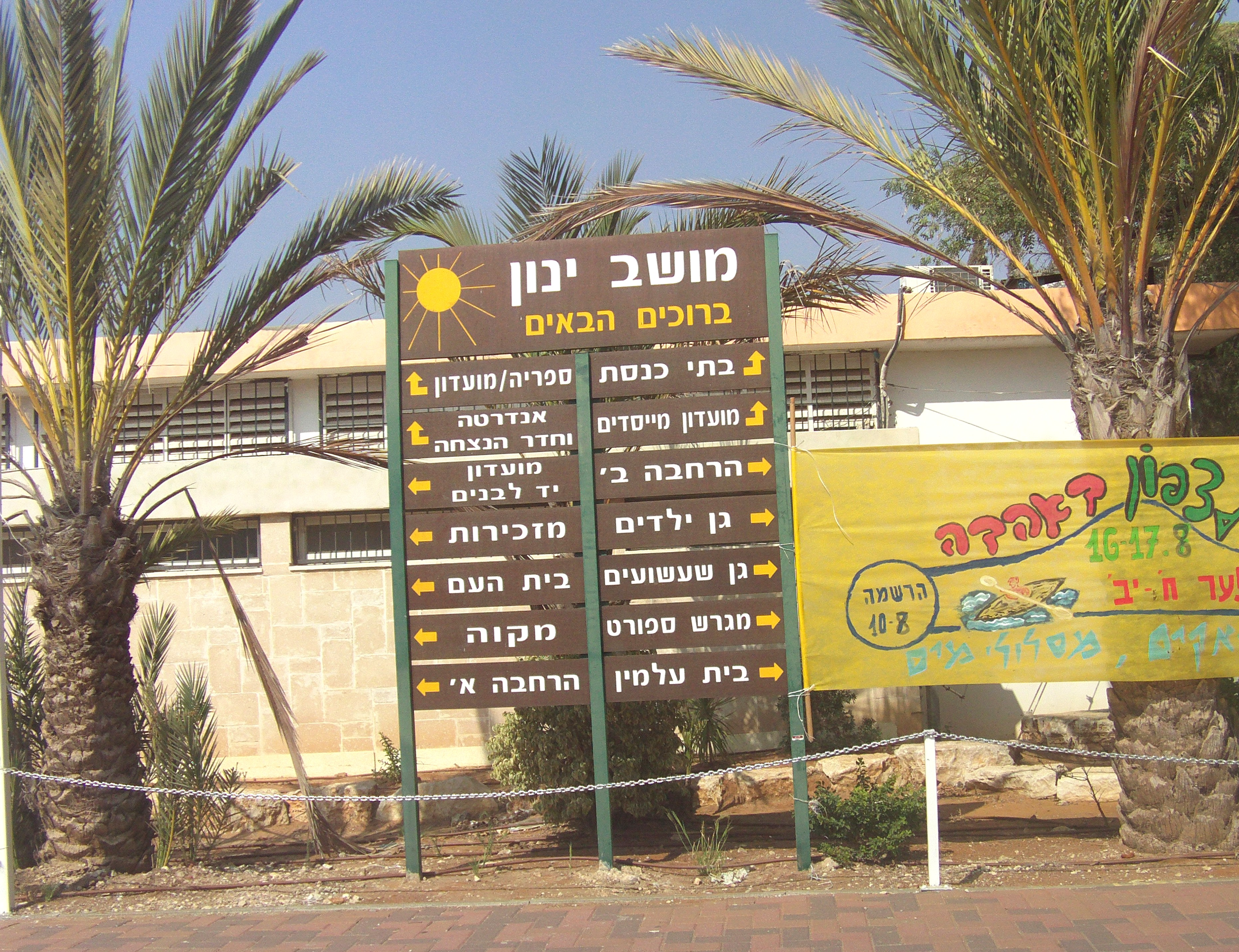
- Moshav entrance

- Location within Ashkelon region of Israel
- Coordinates: 31°44′27″N 34°46′57″E
- Country: Israel
- District: Southern
- Subdistrict: Ashkelon
- Council: Be'er Tuvia
- Affiliation: Moshavim Movement
- Founded: 1952
- Founder: Yemenite Jewish immigrants
- Population (2024): 1,255

Yinon (Hebrew: יִנּוֹן, lit. 'it shall flourish') is a moshav in southern Israel. Located near Kiryat Malakhi, it falls under the jurisdiction of Be'er Tuvia Regional Council. In 2024 it had a population of 1,255.

== History ==
The moshav was founded in 1952 by Jewish refugees from Yemen, on the land of the depopulated Palestinian village of Al-Masmiyya al-Kabira. Its name was taken from a passage in the Bible, Psalm 72:17: God's name "shall flourish as long as the sun".
