= Al-Masmiyya al-Kabira =

al-Masmiyya al-Kabira المسمية الكبيرة al-Masmiyya
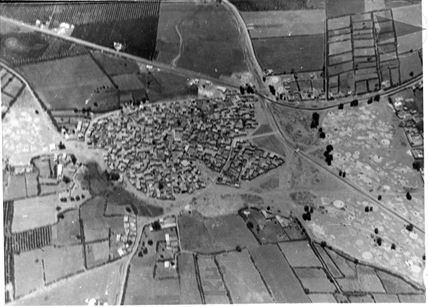
- Masmiya al Kabira, 1947
- Etymology: from "to be lofty"
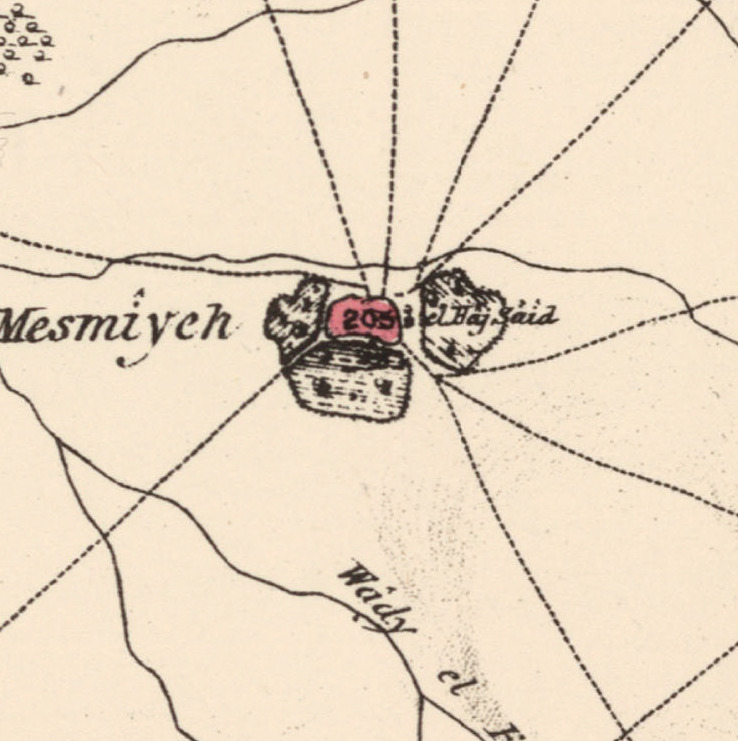
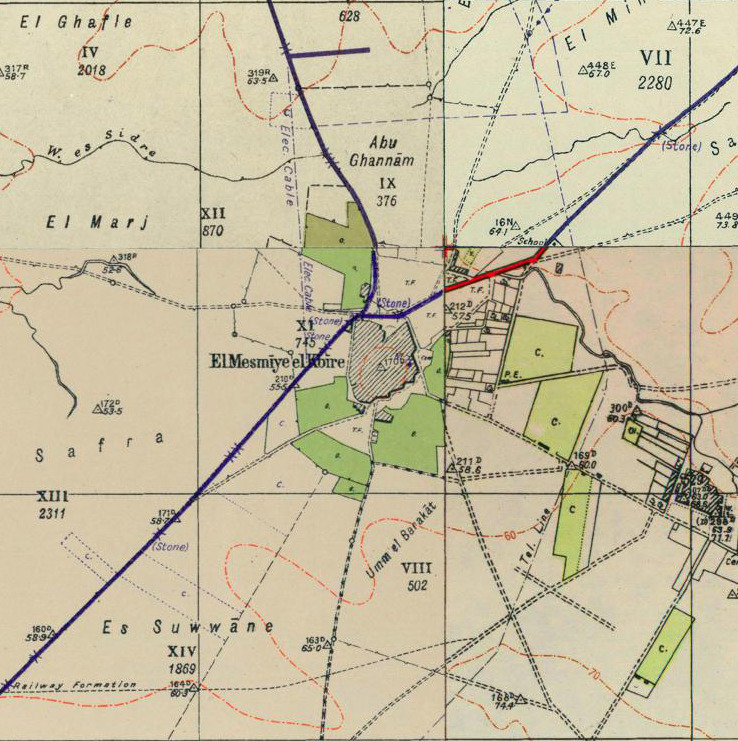
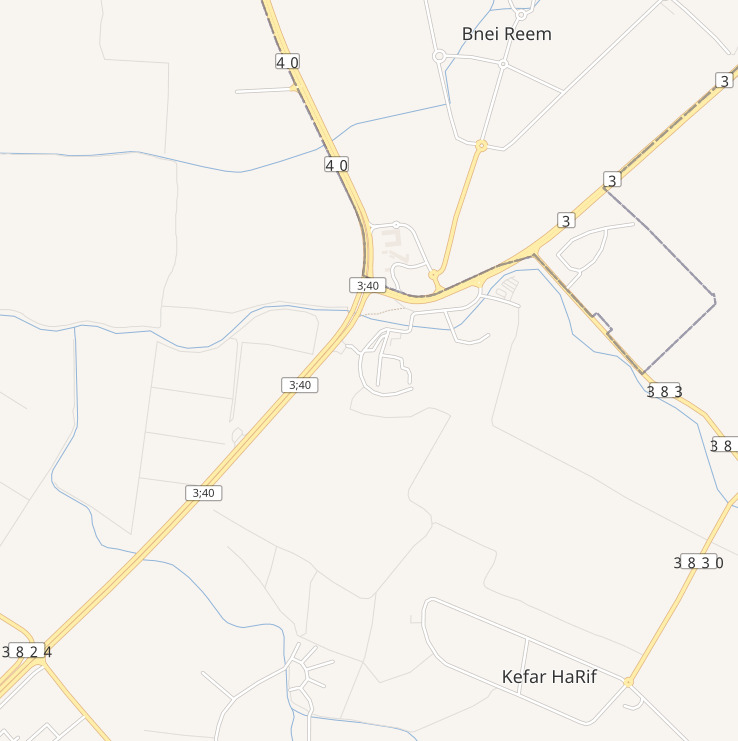
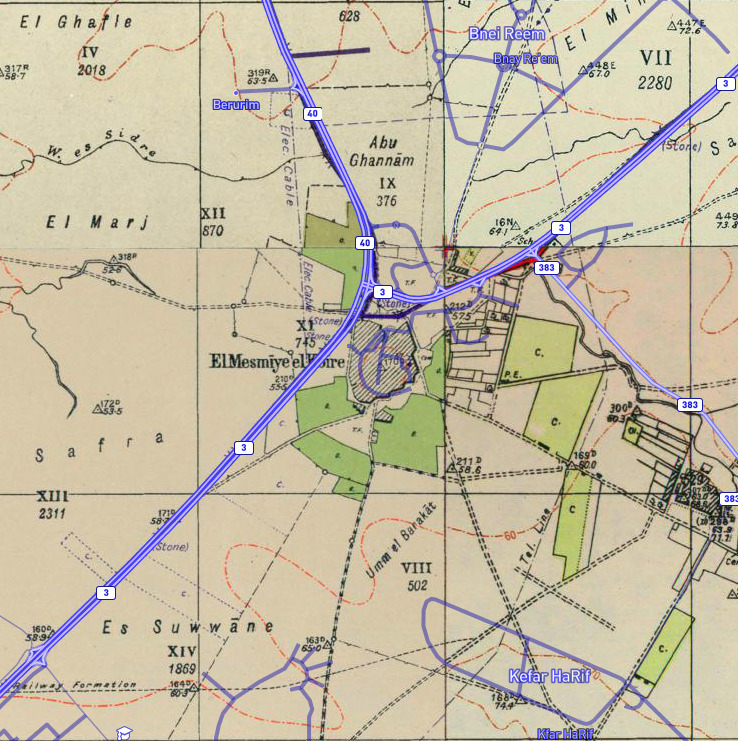
- 1870s map 1940s map modern map 1940s with modern overlay map A series of historical maps of the area around Al-Masmiyya al-Kabira (click the buttons)

- Location within Mandatory Palestine
- Coordinates: 31°45′27″N 34°47′05″E
- Palestine grid: 129/129
- Geopolitical entity: Mandatory Palestine
- Subdistrict: Gaza
- Date of depopulation: July 8, 1948

Area
  - Total: 20,687 dunams (20.687 km^{2}; 7.987 sq mi)

Population (1945)
  - Total: 2,520
- Cause(s) of depopulation: Military assault by Yishuv forces
- Current Localities: Bnei Re'em, Hatzav, Yinon, Ahva

Al-Masmiyya al-Kabira (Arabic: المسمية الكبيرة) was a Palestinian village in the Gaza Subdistrict, located 41 kilometers (25 mi) northeast of Gaza. With a land area of 20,687 dunams, the village site (135 dunams) was situated on an elevation of 75 meters (246 ft) along the coastal plain. It was depopulated during the 1948 Arab–Israeli War. Before the war, it had a population of 2,520 in 1945.

The name of the village has been retained in the "Masmiya junction", the unofficial name of the large Re'em junction connecting Israel's Highway 3 with Highway 40, which the village ruins are adjacent to.

== History ==
Remains from the Roman and Byzantine eras have been found here, including a coin made under Emperor Mauritius Tiberius (596–597 CE). Remains, including pottery and glass were found from the Umayyad and Abbasid periods, with local glass-industry operation here in the Abbasid era. The settlement continued during Ayyubid and Mamluk times, with the wealth of pottery and glass found here indicating a strong economy. An undated column-base, with a Nine men's morris pattern incised has also been found here.

=== Ottoman era ===
Al-Masmiyya was mentioned by the Syrian Sufi teacher and traveller Mustafa al-Bakri al-Siddiqi (ar)(1688-1748/9) in the first half of the eighteenth century, and in the 1780s, the French traveller Volney noted that the village produced a great deal of spun-cotton.

In 1838, el-Mesmiyeh was noted as a Muslim village in the Gaza district.

In 1863, the French explorer Victor Guérin visited the village, which he found to have seven hundred inhabitants. Around the well were stones, some large, and apparently ancient. The village was surrounded by plantations of tobacco, watermelons and cucumbers. An Ottoman village list of about 1870 showed that “El-Mesmije” had 243 houses and a population of 656, though the population count included only men.

The adjectival al-Kabira ("major") was later added to Masmiyya's name to distinguish it from the nearby al-Masmiyya al-Saghira, established in the mid-19th century. In the late 19th century, al-Masmiyya al-Kabira was laid out in a trapezoid-like pattern, with the long base of the trapezoid facing west. The village was surrounded by gardens and its houses were constructed of adobe bricks or concrete. The most recent expansion of it was westward and southwestward.

=== British Mandate era ===
In the 1922 census of Palestine conducted by the British Mandate authorities, Mesmiyet Kabira had a population of 1390 Muslims, increasing in the 1931 census when Masmiya al Kabira had a population of 1756 Muslims and 4 Christians, in a total of 354 houses.

The village contained two mosques and two schools. The boys' school was built in 1922 and had an enrollment of 307 students in 1947, while the girls' school was built in 1944 and had 39 students 1947. Al-Masmiyya al-Kabira was one of the few localities in the district to be governed by a village council. The town had a gas station and a clinic.

In the 1945 statistics, Al-Masmiyya al-Kabira had 2,520 inhabitants; 2,510 Muslims and 10 Christians, with a total of 20,687 dunams of land, according to an official land and population survey. Agriculture was the main economic activity of the village and the dominant crops were citrus and grains; in 1945, a total of 1,005 dunams were devoted to citrus, while 18,092 were allotted to grains, while 135 dunams were built-up land. Beside crop cultivation, residents raised livestock and poultry. Some also worked in the nearby British Army camp. Al-Masmiyya al-Kabira had a weekly market on Thursdays that attracted residents from neighboring communities.

=== 1948 War and aftermath ===
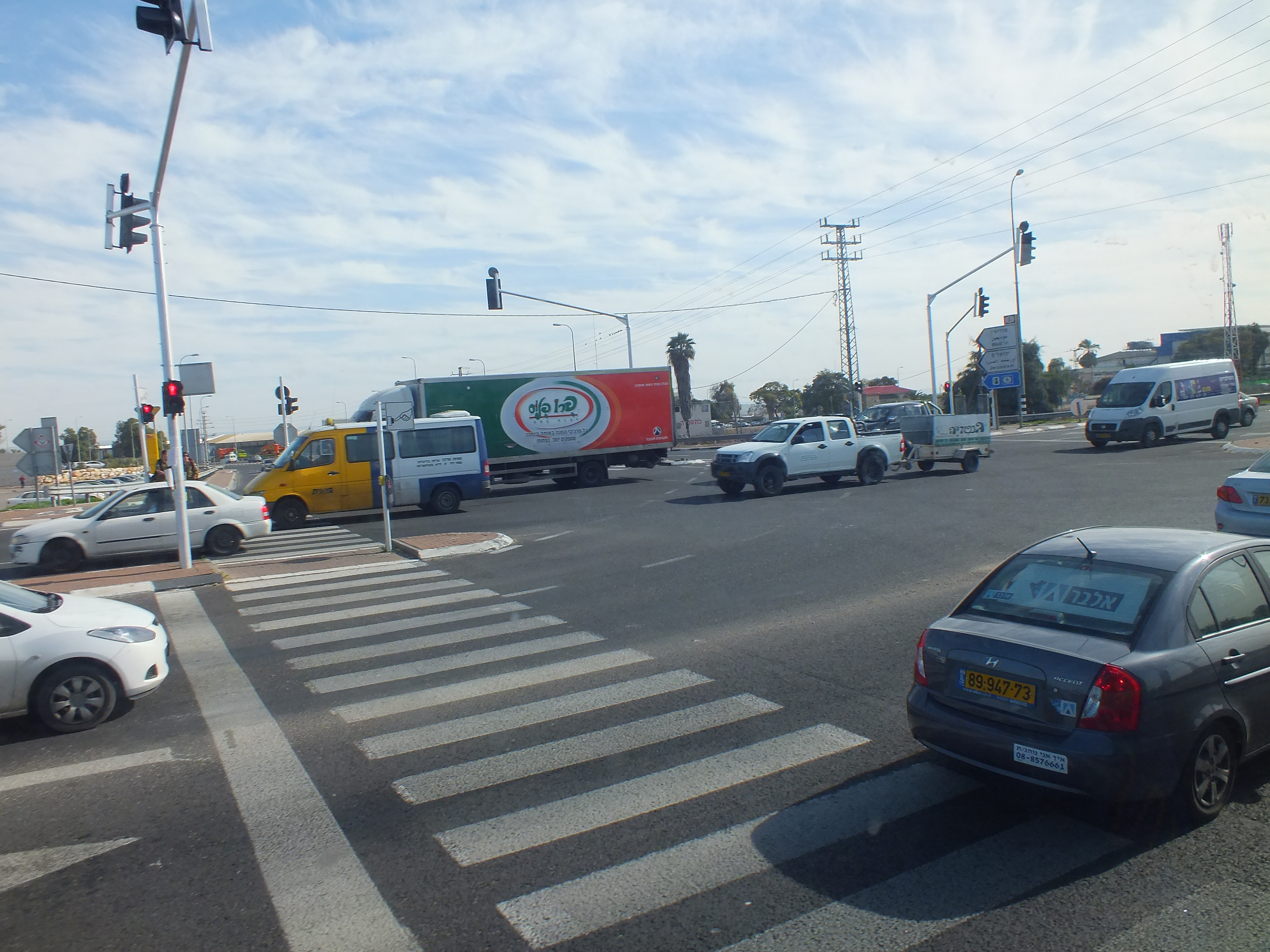
Masmiya junction in 2012

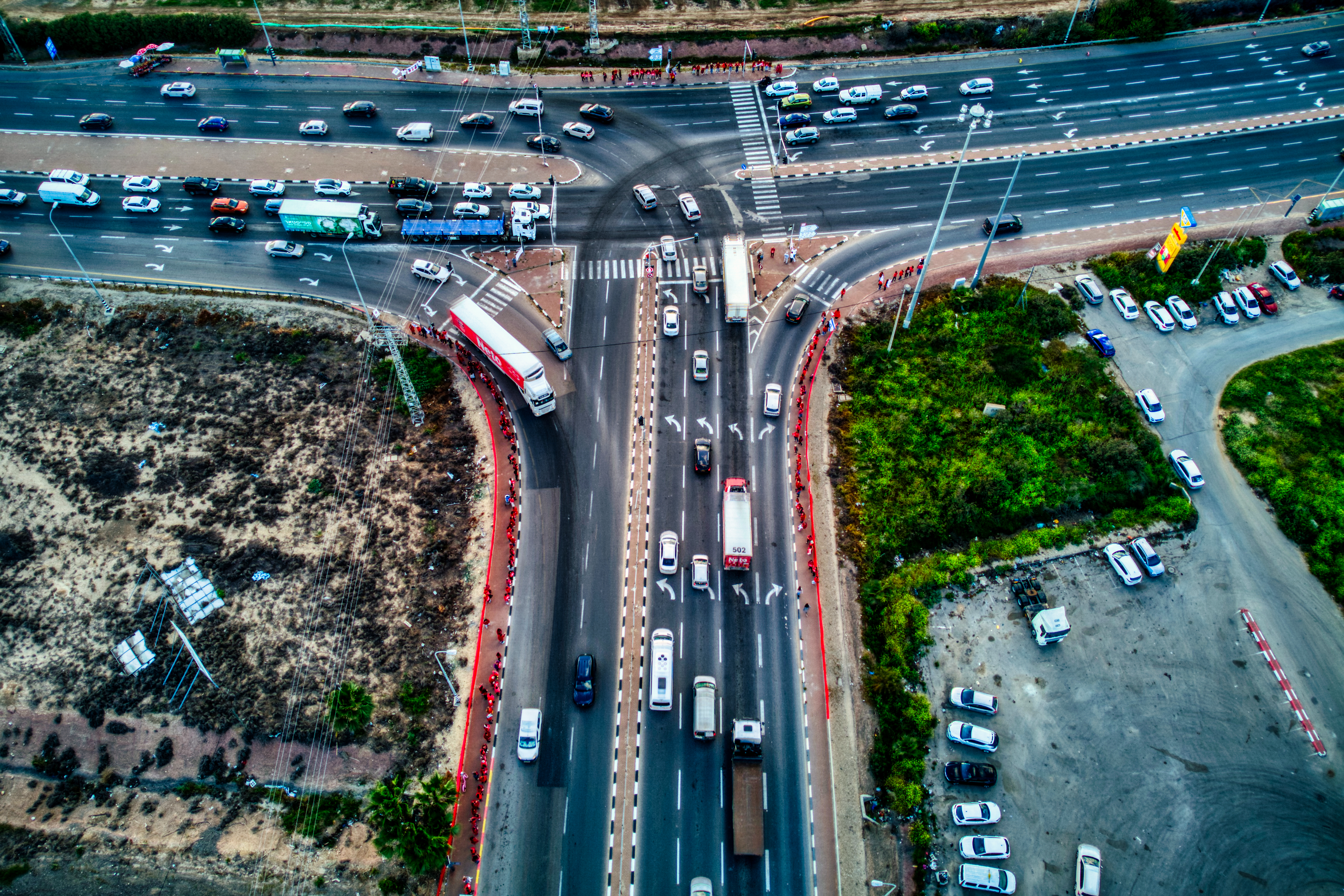
Masmiya junction from the air; the ruins of the village begin in the bottom left to this picture

The village was fenced in by Hagana forces purportedly to protect the village against Deir Yassin like incidents. Al-Masmiyya al-Kabira was captured by the Israeli forces of the Givati Brigade during Operation An-Far. The New York Times reported that it had been occupied on 11 July, blocking an Egyptian attempt to break through to Latrun from the direction of al-Majdal. However, the Haganah claim it was captured during "several clearing operations in the brigade's rear guard, to eliminate the threat and danger posed by the presence of Arab civilian concentrations to the rear of the front."

Following the war the area was incorporated into the State of Israel and Morris reports that by 27 May 1949, 21 of the approx 400 former Palestinian Arab villages had been repopulated by newly arrived ‘olim, Al-Masmiyya al-Kabira along with Aqir, Zarnuqa, Yibna, Ijzim, Ein Hawd, Tarshiha, Safsaf, Tarbikha, Dayr Tarif and that six more including Deir Yassin were slated for colonization. Two moshavim, Bnei Re'em and Hatzav, were established on al-Masmiyya al-Kabira's land in 1949, with Yinon also founded on the village's former land in 1952. In 1976, another new village, Ahva was established on the land. A Palestinian Arab family was able to remain in the area and was used as Shabbat goy by the community of Bnei Re'em.

According to Palestinian historian Walid Khalidi, in reference to the remains of al-Masmiyya al-Kabira in 1992:

The two schools and several village houses are extant. The girls' school is deserted, while the boys' school has been converted into an Israeli army installation. Some of the houses are inhabited, but others have been turned into warehouses. One house serves as a shop where juice is sold. All are made of concrete with simple architectural features—flat roofs and rectangular doors and windows. A date palm tree grows in the yard of a house that belonged to a Palestinian named Tawfiq al-Rabi. An Israeli gas station is located on the same spot where the village's gas station (once the property of Hasan Abd al-Aziz and Nimr Muhanna) once stood. The lands in the vicinity are cultivated by Israeli farmers.

== People descending from the villagers ==
- Omar M. Yaghi

== Bibliography ==
- Barron, J.B., ed. (1923). Palestine: Report and General Abstracts of the Census of 1922. Government of Palestine.
- Conder, C.R.; Kitchener, H.H. (1882). The Survey of Western Palestine: Memoirs of the Topography, Orography, Hydrography, and Archaeology. Vol. 2. London: Committee of the Palestine Exploration Fund.
- Dolón, Rosana; Todolí, Júlia (2008). Analysing Identities in Discourse. John Benjamins Publishing. ISBN 978-90-272-2719-5.
- Government of Palestine, Department of Statistics (1945). Village Statistics, April, 1945.
- Guérin, V. (1869). Description Géographique Historique et Archéologique de la Palestine (in French). Vol. 1: Judee, pt. 2. Paris: L'Imprimerie Nationale.
- Hadawi, S. (1970). Village Statistics of 1945: A Classification of Land and Area ownership in Palestine. Palestine Liberation Organization Research Center. Archived from the original on 2018-12-08.
- Hartmann, M. (1883). "Die Ortschaftenliste des Liwa Jerusalem in dem türkischen Staatskalender für Syrien auf das Jahr 1288 der Flucht (1871)". Zeitschrift des Deutschen Palästina-Vereins. 6: 102–149.
- Khalidi, W. (1992). All That Remains: The Palestinian Villages Occupied and Depopulated by Israel in 1948. Washington D.C.: Institute for Palestine Studies. ISBN 0-88728-224-5.
- Mamalya, Haim (2021-08-01). "El-Masmiyya el-Kabira" (133). Hadashot Arkheologiyot – Excavations and Surveys in Israel.
- Mills, E., ed. (1932). Census of Palestine 1931. Population of Villages, Towns and Administrative Areas. Jerusalem: Government of Palestine.
- Morris, B. (2004). The Birth of the Palestinian Refugee Problem Revisited. Cambridge University Press. ISBN 978-0-521-00967-6.
- Palmer, E.H. (1881). The Survey of Western Palestine: Arabic and English Name Lists Collected During the Survey by Lieutenants Conder and Kitchener, R. E. Transliterated and Explained by E.H. Palmer. Committee of the Palestine Exploration Fund.
- Robinson, E.; Smith, E. (1841). Biblical Researches in Palestine, Mount Sinai and Arabia Petraea: A Journal of Travels in the year 1838. Vol. 2. Boston: Crocker & Brewster.
- Robinson, E.; Smith, E. (1841). Biblical Researches in Palestine, Mount Sinai and Arabia Petraea: A Journal of Travels in the year 1838. Vol. 3. Boston: Crocker & Brewster.
- Socin, A. (1879). "Alphabetisches Verzeichniss von Ortschaften des Paschalik Jerusalem". Zeitschrift des Deutschen Palästina-Vereins. 2: 135–163.
- Volney, C.-F. (1788). Travels Through Syria and Egypt, in the Years 1783, 1784, and 1785: containing the Present Natural and Political State of Those Countries, Their Productions, Arts, Manufactures, and Commerce : with Observations on the Manners, Customs, and Government of the Turks and Arabs : Illustrated. Vol. 2. Printed for G.G.J. and J . Robinson ...
