= Assaf Lowengart =

Israeli baseball player (born 1998)

Assaf Lowengart אסף לוונגרט

Free agent
- Infielder / Outfielder
- Born: March 1, 1998 (age 28); Timorim, Israel
- Bats: Right Throws: Right
Medals
Men's baseball
Representing Israel
European Baseball Championship
Silver medal – second place	2021 Turin	Team

Assaf Lowengart OLY (Hebrew: אסף לוונגרט; born March 1, 1998) is an Israeli professional baseball outfielder who is a free agent. He has notably played for Team Israel, and most notably played in the 2020 Summer Olympics. He played for Team Israel in the 2023 World Baseball Classic in Miami, in March 2023. He played shortstop in college baseball for the Mansfield Mountaineers in the Pennsylvania State Athletic Conference, and for the William & Mary Tribe in the Colonial Athletic Association.

== Early life ==
He is the son of Oded Lowengart and Ayelet Lowengart. His hometown is Timorim, Israel. He attended high school in Be'er Tuvia Regional Council. He then served in the Israel Defense Forces.

== College career ==
In 2020, Lowengart attended SUNY Sullivan Community College in New York State. He also played for Team Misgav in Israel in 2020.

In 2021, Lowengart attended Mansfield University of Pennsylvania in Pennsylvania. He played shortstop for the Mansfield Mountaineers in the Pennsylvania State Athletic Conference. In 2021, he batted .290/.394/.645 with 11 home runs (3rd in the conference) and 26 RBI in 107 at bats.

In 2022, he again played for Mansfield. He batted .356/.419/.678 with 19 doubles (5th in the conference), 11 home runs (9th), and 45 RBI (10th) in 174 at-bats, while playing 27 games in center field, 14 games at shortstop, 4 games at third base, and one game each in left field and right field. He was named Pennsylvania State Athletic Conference (PSAC) Eastern Division 2nd-Team Utility Player by the conference coaches.

In 2023, Lowengart played one game for the William & Mary Tribe in the Colonial Athletic Association, batting one-for-three with a home run. Lowengart broke an ankle in the fifth inning of the team’s first game, but stayed in the game and hit a home run in the 7th inning; he spent the remainder of the 2023 season recovering. He graduated from William & Mary with an MBA in May 2023.

== Professional career ==
=== New York Boulders ===
On February 9, 2024, Lowengart signed with the New York Boulders of the Frontier League. In 21 appearances for the Boulders, Lowengart slashed .154/.274/.365 with three home runs, 11 RBI, and two stolen bases.

=== Southern Maryland Blue Crabs ===
On March 4, 2025, Lowengart was traded to the Southern Maryland Blue Crabs of the Atlantic League of Professional Baseball in exchange for a player to be named later. However, he was released prior to the start of the regular season on April 24.

=== Great Falls Voyagers ===
On April 30, 2026, Lowengart signed with the Great Falls Voyagers of the Pioneer Baseball League. In 10 appearances for Great Falls, he went 5-for-21 (.238) with one home run, five RBI, and three stolen bases. Lowengart was released by the Voyagers on June 8.

== International career ==
Lowengart competed on the Israel national baseball team for qualification for the 2020 Olympics. He also played for the team at the Africa/Europe 2020 Olympic Qualification tournament in Italy in September 2019, which Israel won to qualify to play baseball at the 2020 Summer Olympics in Tokyo.

He played for Team Israel again in the 2023 World Baseball Classic, in Miami in March 2023. Lowengart played for Team Israel manager Ian Kinsler, and alongside two-time All Star outfielder Joc Pederson, starting pitcher Dean Kremer, and others.

Lowengart played second base and batted .273/.318/.407 for Team Israel in the 2023 European Baseball Championship in September 2023 in the Czech Republic.

== See also ==
- List of select Jewish baseball players
