= Kfar HaRif =

Moshav in southern Israel

Kfar HaRif: כְּפַר הָרִי״ף (Hebrew); كفار هريف (Arabic)
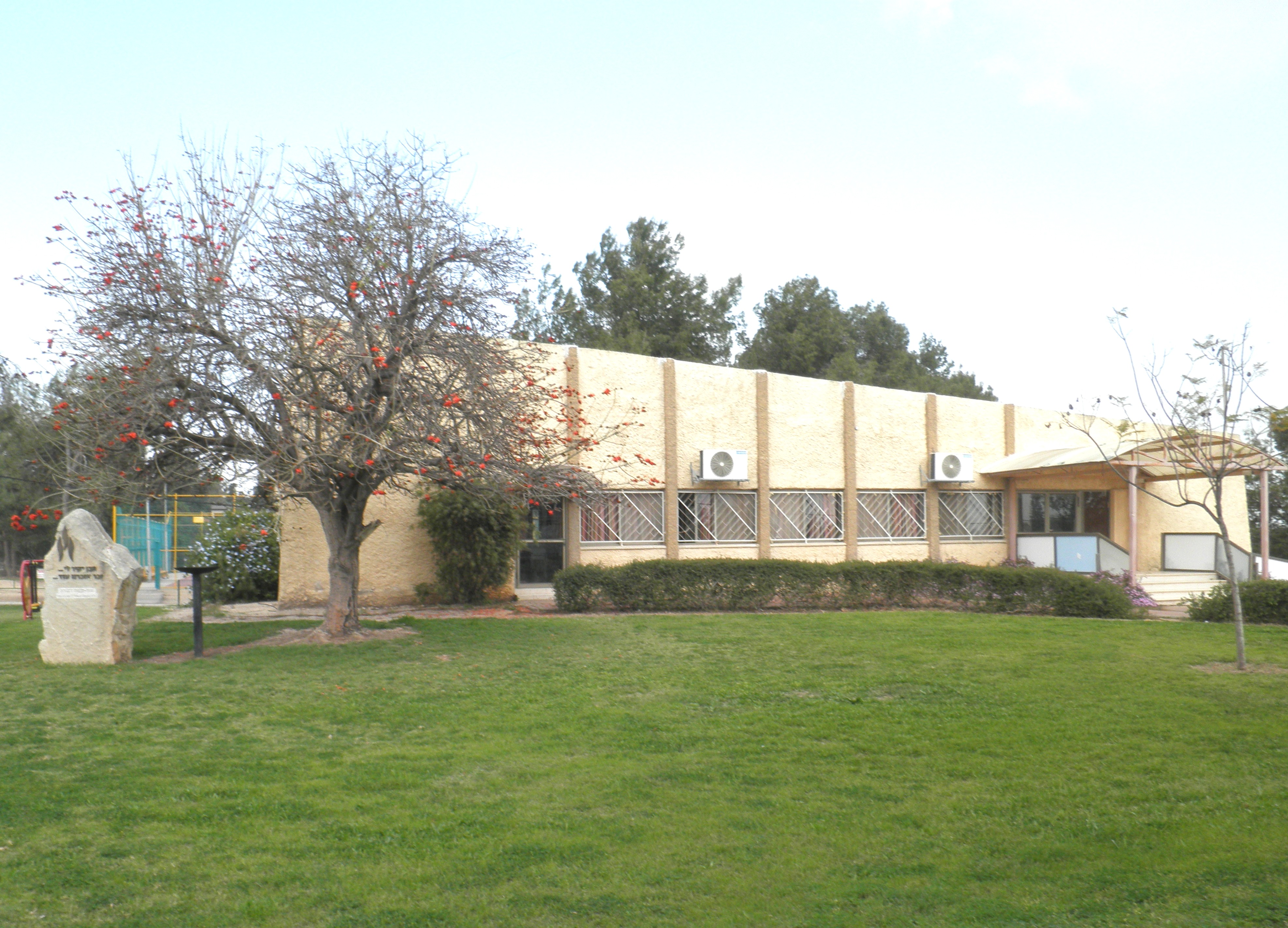
- Kfar HaRif communal hall

- Location within Ashkelon region of Israel
- Coordinates: 31°44′39″N 34°47′44″E
- Country: Israel
- District: Southern
- Subdistrict: Ashkelon
- Council: Yoav
- Affiliation: Agricultural Union
- Founded: 1956
- Founder: Moroccan Jews
- Population (2024): 836

Kfar HaRif (Hebrew: כְּפַר הָרִי״ף, lit. Village of the Rif) is a moshav in southern Israel. Located on the border of the Shephelah and the Israeli coastal plain around 2 kilometres northeast of Kiryat Malakhi, it is the largest community under the jurisdiction of Yoav Regional Council. In 2024 it had a population of 836.

The HaRif creek, named after the community, is located to the east of the village. Nearby are some wells.

== History ==
The moshav was founded at the end of 1956 by Jewish refugees and immigrants to Israel from Morocco, and was named after the Rif (medieval rabbi Isaac Alfasi), one of the great codifiers of Jewish law, who lived in Fez, Morocco. The founders were later joined by Jewish immigrants from several countries in Eastern Europe.)

Kfar HaRif was founded at a site near the former depopulated Palestinian Arab village of Al-Masmiyya al-Saghira.

When it was founded, it joined the sector "HaMa'amad HaBeinoni" (the middle position) – a group of moshavim where the people who settled there paid for the economy they constructed, as opposed to most moshavim, which received their property for free from the government. Today, the moshav is part of the Agricultural Union.)

In recent years, most residents have worked outside the community, while some continue to maintain an agricultural economy. The main branches of agriculture include orchards, vineyards, flowers and fowl.)
