= Kfar Warburg =

Moshav in southern Israel

Kfar Warburg: כפר ורבורג (Hebrew)
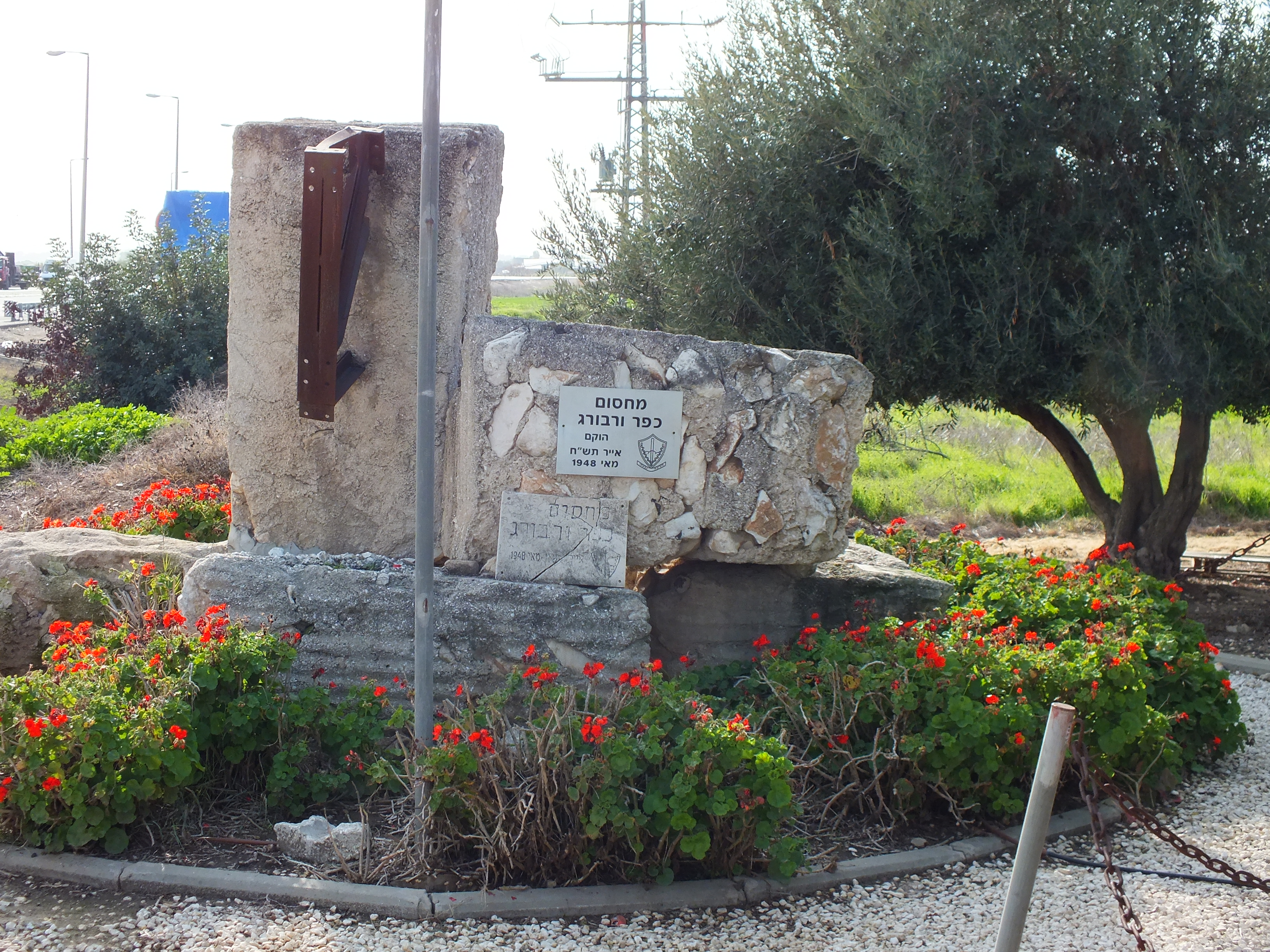
- Kfar Warburg

- Location within Ashkelon region of Israel
- Coordinates: 31°43′11″N 34°43′24″E
- Country: Israel
- District: Southern
- Subdistrict: Ashkelon
- Council: Be'er Tuvia
- Affiliation: Moshavim Movement
- Founded: 31 October 1939
- Founder: "Menachem" members
- Population (2024): 1,199
- Website: www.kfar-warburg.com

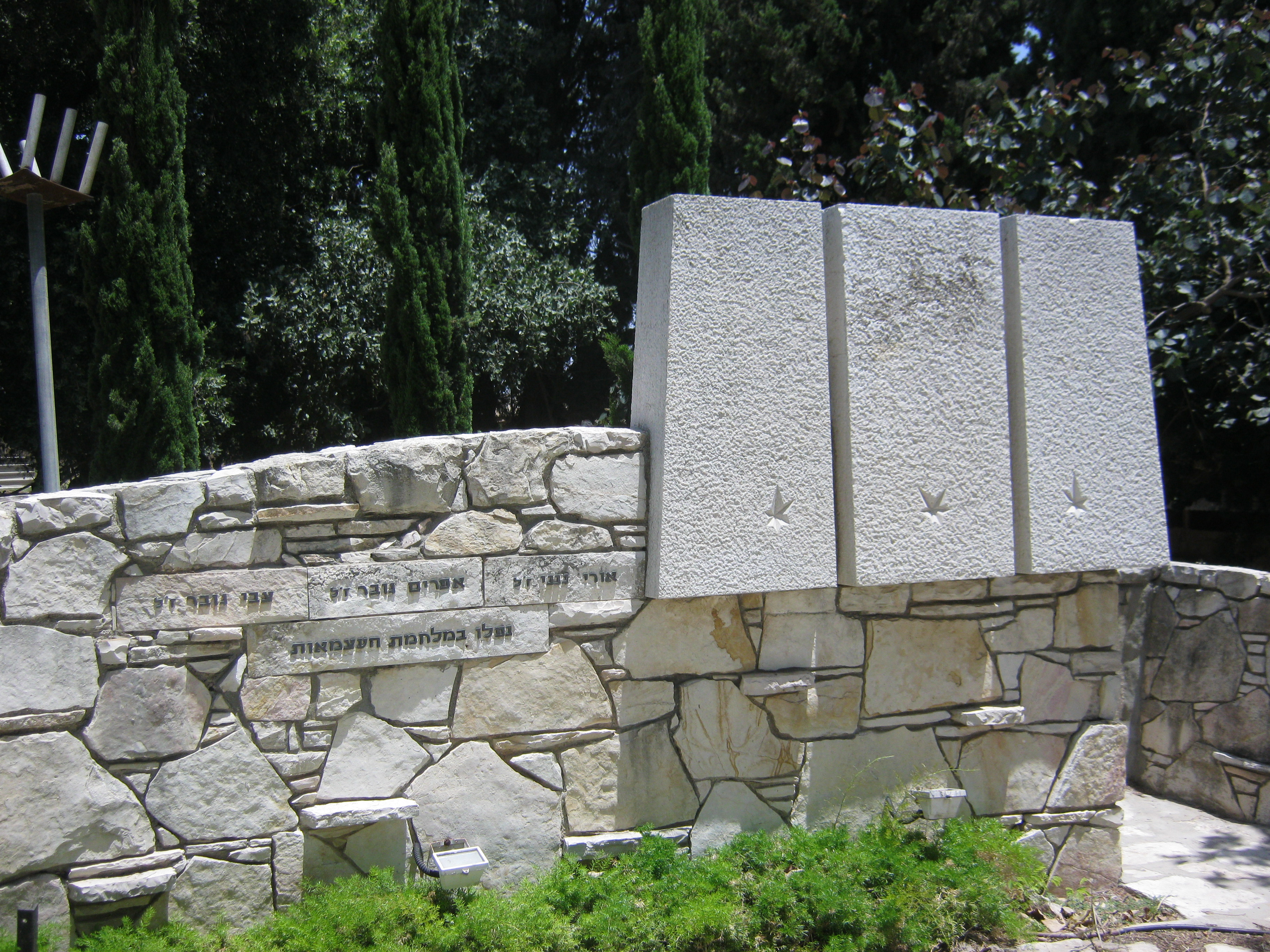
A memorial for three Jewish Israeli troops who were killed during the 1948 Arab–Israeli War along with Hebrew-language inscription

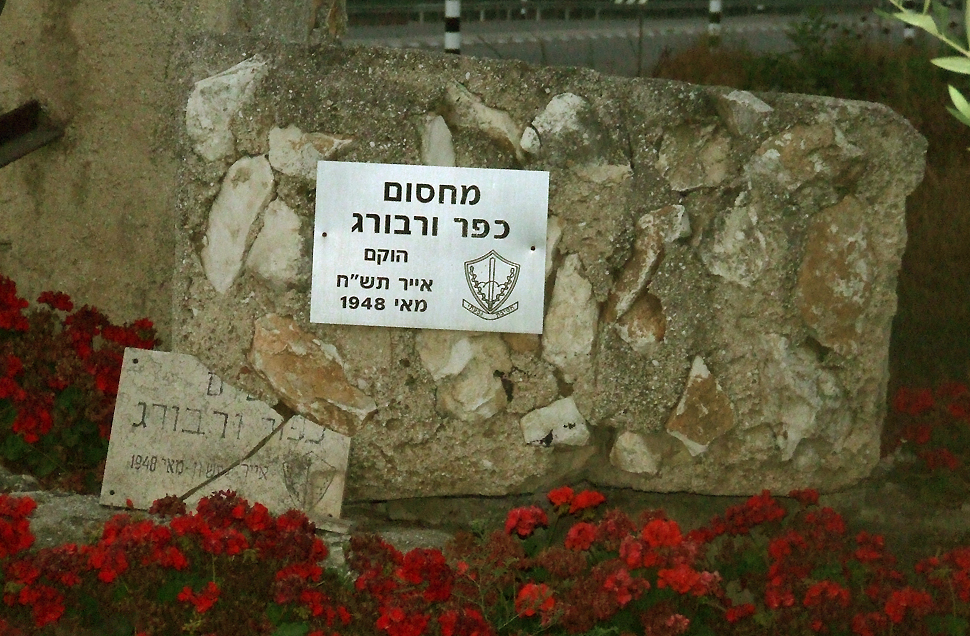
A gate to the moshav with its name written in Hebrew

Kfar Warburg (Hebrew: כְּפַר וַרְבּוּרְג, lit. 'Warburg Village') is a large moshav in south-central Israel. Located near Kiryat Malakhi with 98 farms covering an area of 6,000 dunams, it falls under the jurisdiction of Be'er Tuvia Regional Council. In 2024 it had a population of 1,199.

== History ==
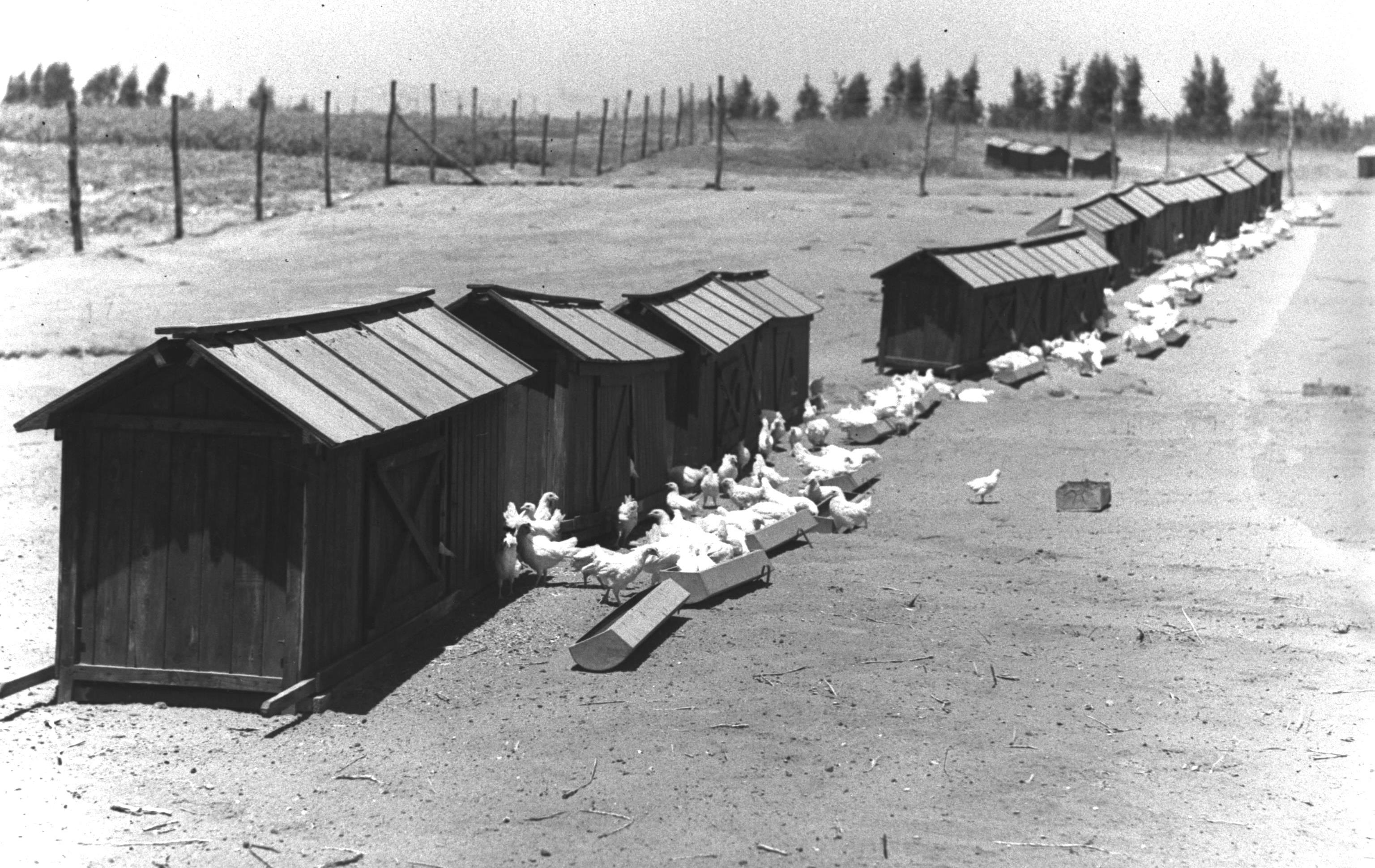
Chicken coops at Kfar Warburg, 1938

The moshav was founded on 31 October 1939 by members of the "Menachem" organisation. It was named after Felix M. Warburg, one of the leaders of the Jewish community in the United States and a founder of the American Jewish Joint Distribution Committee (JDC).

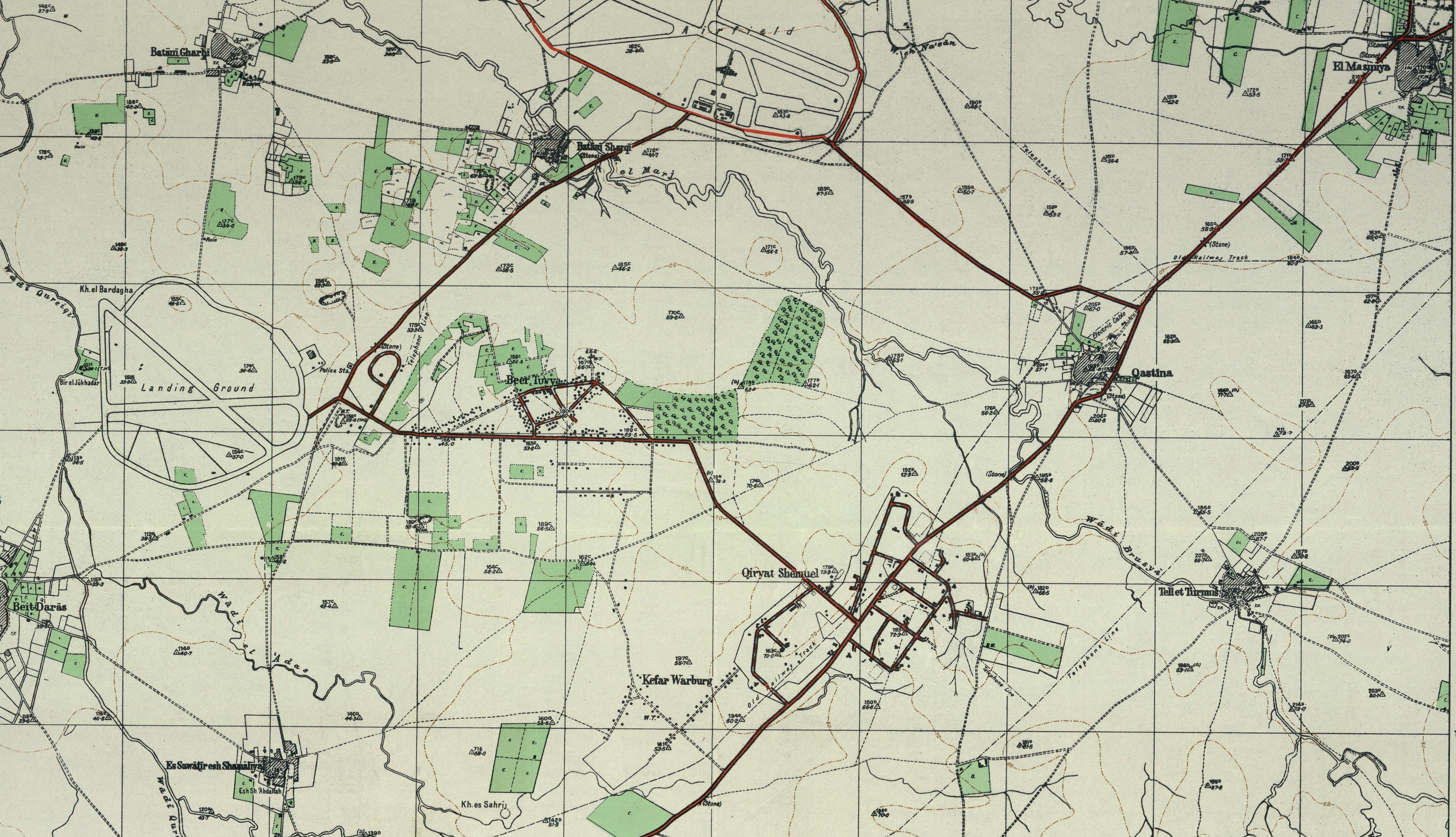
Kfar Warburg 1948 1:20,000 (bottom centre)

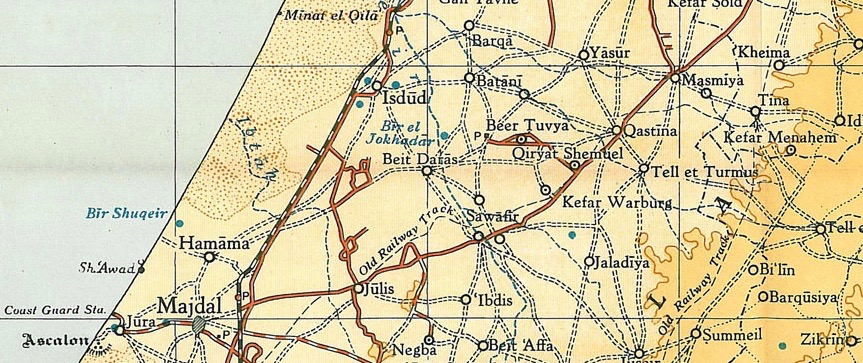
Kfar Warburg 1948 1:250,000

In the early 1950s, after the population of Kfar Warburg doubled, a culture hall with a 880-seat auditorium was built at the crossroads of the agricultural town's three main roads. Plays by the Habima and Cameri theaters were performed there almost every week.

== Notable residents ==
- Niv Eliasi, Israeli association footballer (goalkeeperr)
- Yigal Hurvitz, a former Minister of Finance, was buried in the moshav
- Aviva Rabinovich, professor of botany, chief scientist at the Israel Nature and Parks Authority and an environmental activist, spent her childhood in the moshav
