= Highway 75 (Israel) =

Road in Israel

Coordinates: 32°42′35″N 35°08′11″E

Highway 75
- כביש 75
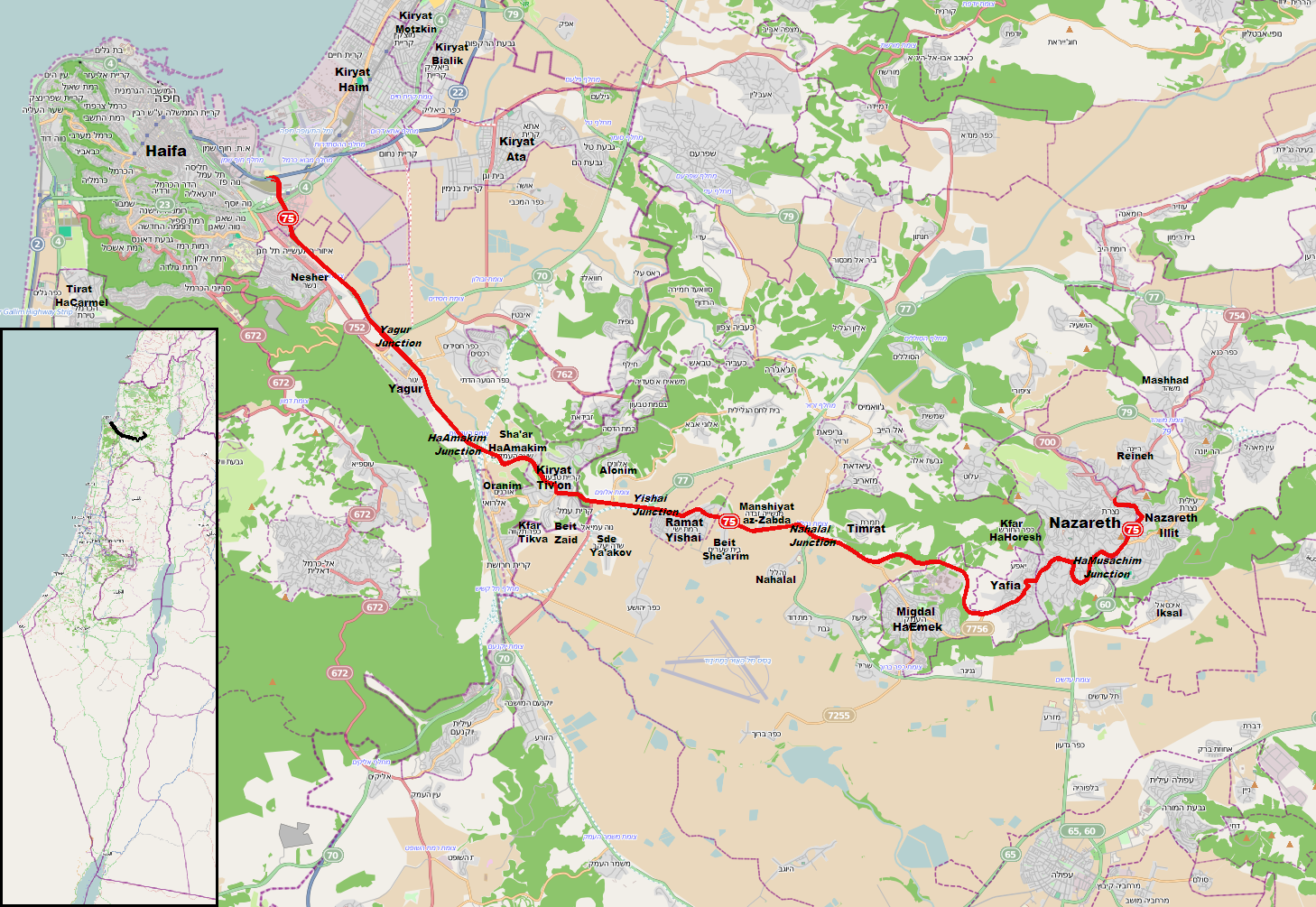

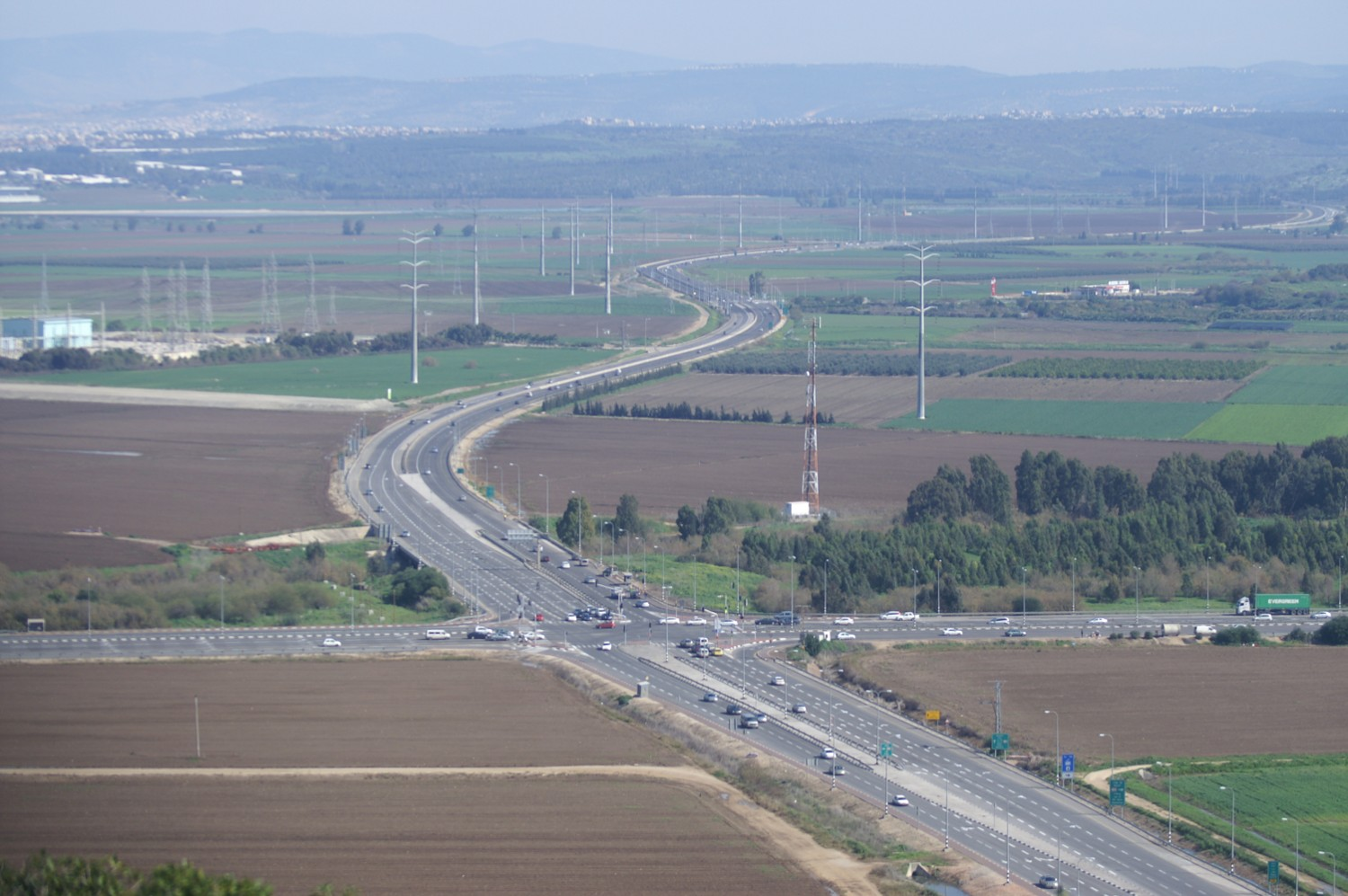
- Intersection of Highways 70 and 75, and Route 752 at Yagur Junction in 2009 before it was reconstructed as an interchange

Route information
- Length: 40 km (25 mi)

Major junctions
- West end: Kishon Interchange
- Yagur junction; HaAmakim Junction; Yishai Junction; Nahalal Junction; Migdal Ha'emek Junction; HaMusachim Junction
- East end: Natzrat Tzafon Junction

Location
- Country: Israel
- Major cities: Haifa, Kiryat Tiv'on, Migdal HaEmek, Yafia, Nazareth, Nof HaGalil

Highway system
- Roads in Israel; Highways
| ← Highway 73 | → Highway 77 |

Highway 75 is a 40 km long east-west highway in northern Israel. It runs from Haifa in the west to Nazareth and Nof HaGalil in the east.

== The Highway ==
Commonly known as the Haifa–Nazareth Highway, Highway 75 begins in its confluence with Highway 22 just east of Downtown Haifa, from where it stretches as an elevated carriageway through the industrial area of East Haifa Bay just above sea level, where it crosses Road 4. It then runs south-eastward for about ten kilometers passing below the steep northeast slopes of the Carmel Range. At Amakim Junction, the road turns east, rising to about 160m above sea level. as it passes through Kiryat Tiv'on. It then descends crossing the northern edge of the Jezreel Valley. It ascends to 265 m. passing just north of Migdal HaEmek, and to over 300 m. as it enters Yafia and the natural bowl of the Nazareth Range of the Lower Galilee.

In Yafia and continuing into Nazareth, the road becomes a local thoroughfare with frequent controlled intersections. At Nazareth South Junction, it detours around the southern edge of the Hirbat al-Dir neighbourhood reaching HaMusachim Junction with the northern terminus of Highway 60 south of the Old City. It then makes a half circle around Nazareth, turning east, then north and then west along the border of Nazareth and Nof HaGalil, reaching an altitude of 460 m. just before terminating at Nazareth North Junction with Route 754 at 430m.

== Development ==
By 2014, as part of the western extension of the road, a series of viaducts were constructed in order to connect it with the Carmel Tunnels and Highway 22 towards downtown Haifa.

== Junctions & Interchanges (west to east) ==
| km | Name | Type | Meaning | Location | Road(s) Crossed |
|---|---|---|---|---|---|
| 0 | מחלף קישון 1 (Kishon Interchange) | | Named after Kishon River | Haifa | Highway 22 Highway 23 |
| 1 | מחלף קישון 2 (Kishon Interchange) | | | Haifa | Highway 4 |
| 4.6 | מחלף נשר (Nesher Interchange) | | Named after Nesher Cement Factory | Haifa | Highway 4 |
↓Highway 75 concurrent with Highway 70 between Yagur and HaAmakim Junctions↓
| 6.9 | מחלף יגור (Yagur Interchange) | | Named after former location | Yagur | Highway 70; Route 752 |
| 10.9 | צומת העמקים (HaAmakim Junction) | | The Valleys | | Highway 70 |
↑Highway 75 concurrent with Highway 70 between Yagur and HaAmakim Junctions↑
| 11.5 | | | | Kiryat Tiv'on, Oranim Academic College, Kfar Tikva | Road 7213 |
| 12.8 | צומת שער העמקים (Sha'ar HaAmakim Junction) | | Gate of the Valleys | Sha'ar HaAmakim | |
| 14.7 | | | | Kiryat Tiv'on | Yitzhak Rabin St. Alonim St. |
| 15.2 | | | | Kiryat Tiv'on, Beit Zaid | Borochov St. |
| 15.9 | צומת השומרים (HaShomrim Junction) | | The Guards | Kiryat Tiv'on; Sde Ya'akov | Route 722 |
| 16.5 | צומת אלונים (Alonim Junction) | | Oaks | Alonim | Road 7513 |
| 17.7 | מחלף ישי (Yishai Interchange) | | Jesse | Ramat Yishai | Highway 77 |
| 18.4 | | | | Ramat Yishai | HaShikma St. |
| 19.5 | (eastbound only) | | | Ramat Yishai | HaAlon St. |
| 19.6 | | | | Ramat Yishai, Ramat Yishai; Industrial Zone | HaDekel St., Eucalyptus St. |
| 20.4 | | | House of Gates | Beit She'arim (moshav), Neve Ya'ar; Agricultural Research; Center | HaEtz HaGadol St. |
| 21.6 | | | | Manshiyat az-Zabda | |
| 23.2 | צומת נהלל (Nahalal Junction) | | Named after biblical location | Nahalal | Highway 73; Road 7626 |
| 23.9 | | | | Timrat | |
| 25.2 | צומת מגדל העמק מערב (Migdal Ha'emek Ma'arav Junction) | | Migdal HaEmek West | Migdal HaEmek | Road 7555 (HaBanim Blvd.) |
| 27.7 | צומת כפר החורש (Kfar HaHoresh Junction) | | Ploughman's Village | Kfar HaHoresh | local road |
| 27.8 | צומת מגדל העמק (Migdal Ha'emek Junction) | | The Valley Tower | Migdal HaEmek | Sha'ul Amor Blvd. |
| 30.2 | צומת מגדל העמק מזרח (Migdal Ha'emek Mizrah Junction) | | Migdal HaEmek East | Migdal HaEmek | Road 7756 (HaBanim Blvd.) |
| 30.7 | | | | Yafia | 111 St., 215 St. |
| 31.3 | | | | Yafia | 201 St. |
| 31.2 | | | | Yafia | 101 St., 130 St. |
| 31.8 | | | | Yafia | 310 St., 402 St. |
| 32.4 | | | | Yafia | 330 St. |
Derekh Haifa
| 32.9 | | | | Nazareth | 5104 St. |
| 33.2 | | | | Nazareth | 5070 St., 1004 St. |
| 33.3 | | | Western Quarter; Bir al-Amir | Nazareth | 1001 St., 5089 St. |
| 33.6 | צומת נצרת דרום (Natzrat Darom Junction) | | Nazareth South | Nazareth | Paulus HaShishi St., Marj ibn Amer St. |
Derekh HaTziyonut
| 34.4 | | | | Nazareth | 3002 St. |
| 35 | | | | Nazareth | 3008 St., Wadi al-Hajj St. |
| 35.4 | צומת המוסכים (HaMusakhim Junction) | | Auto Repair Shops | Nazareth | Highway 60, Tawfiq Ziad St. |
| 36.2 | | | | Nof HaGalil | Derekh HaEmek |
| 36.7 | | | | Nazareth; Nof HaGalil | A-Shuhada' St., Derekh HaHativot |
| 37.1 | | | | Nazareth; Nof HaGalil | Derekh Kiryat HaMemshala, Ma'ale Yitzhak Blvd. |
| 38.2 | | | | Nof HaGalil | Hermon St. |
| 40 | צומת נצרת צפון (Natzrat Tzafon Junction) | | Nazareth North | Nazareth | Route 754 (HaGalil St.) |

== See also ==
- List of highways in Israel
- Mount Carmel
- Jezreel Valley
- Zevulun Valley
