= Alexander Zaïd =

Co-founder of Jewish militias (1886–1938)

- אלכסנדר זייד
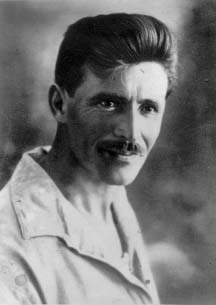
- Zaïd before 1935
- Born: 1886; Zima, Irkutsk Governorate, Russian Empire
- Died: July 11, 1938 (aged 51–52); Mandatory Palestine
- Military career
- Allegiance: Bar-Giora; Hashomer

Alexander Zaïd (Hebrew: אלכסנדר זייד; Russian: Александр Зайд; 1886 – 10 July 1938) was a prominent Russian Zionist. He was most known for co-founding several Jewish defense organizations, including Bar Giora and Hashomer.

== Biography ==
Alexander Zaïd was born in 1886 in Zima, a town in Irkutsk Governorate, in Siberia. His father had been deported from Vilna to Siberia due to revolutionary activity and his mother was a Subbotnik. In 1889, the family moved to Irkutsk. In 1901 they returned to Vilna, where his father remarried. Two years later, the father died, too. The orphaned teenager met Michael Helpern, a First Aliyah pioneer sent to Vilna to promote immigration to Palestine. Zaid moved to Palestine in 1904, under the auspices of the Zionist Labour Movement. He worked at the winery in Rishon LeZion, where he met Israel Shochat, as a construction worker in Ben Shemen and a stonemason in Jerusalem.

In 1907, he helped establish the first Jewish watchmen's organization, the clandestine "Bar-Giora". Two years later, in 1909, he was one of the founders of Hashomer, a Jewish defense organization, to safeguard the Jewish agricultural settlements in Palestine.

In 1926 Zaïd moved to Sheikh Abreik in the Valley of Jezreel, where he worked as a watchman, overseeing the lands of the JNF. The residents of the Arab village at the site had been evicted a few years earlier when the Sursuk family of Beirut sold the land as part of the Sursock Purchases. The locality was known to have archaeological importance but had never been excavated. In 1936, Zaid reported that he had found a breach in the wall of one of the known caves which led to another cave decorated with inscriptions. This led to the excavation of the site and its identification as Beit She'arim.

Zaïd survived two attacks by Arabs, but on the night of 10 July 1938, he was killed. He was ambushed by an Arab gang while on his way to meet members of kibbutz Alonim. The killer was Qassem Tabash, a Bedouin from the al-Hilaf tribe. In 1942, the Palmach killed Tabash in retaliation. Zaïd was survived by his wife and four children.

== Commemoration ==
Zaid is commemorated in the Alexander Zaid monument that was placed in 1941 near the Zaid family's pastures, near the Beit She'arim National Park in Kiryat Tivon. The monument is a statue of Zaid, riding his mare and overlooking the Jezreel Valley. The statue was created by the sculptor David Poulos who sculpted the mare named "Domia" after her sister. Also, the settlements Beit Zaid and Giv'ot Zaid, and streets throughout the country were named after Zaid.

The statue, which was made of iron mesh coated with concrete, wore out over time and was replaced in 1979 by a bronze statue made by the sculptor Dan Zaritsky. On October 5, 2007, the statue of Alexander Zeid was toppled by unknown persons, and on December 31, it was fixed (the movie "Half Ton of Bronze" was based on the incident).

The symbol of the Zaid memorial is used as a logo for the "Hashomer HaHadash" organization, as this organization also runs a leadership program for youth called the "Alexander Zaid Program".

At the point where he was shot and killed (the corner of "Jezreel" and "Hashomerim" streets in Kiryat Amal) a memorial garden was established and inside it was noted the place where Zaid was standing when he was shot as well as the place where, apparently, the murderers ambushed him. The date was set by his widow.

The poet Alexander Penn penned two poems in memory of Zaid, and both were composed by Mordechai Zeira. The most famous of them is "On the hills of Sheikh Abreik" or 'Adamah, 'Admati' ("Land, My Land"), in a Dabke rhythm. The second is called "Zaid's Song", and was performed by Ofira Gluska.

The writer Eliezer Smoli also immortalized the story of the life of Zaid and his family and the settlement throughout the Land of Israel and in Sheikh Abreik, in a number of books, among them "'Anshei Bereshit" (People of the Early Days), "Hayei Rishonim: miyomenei 'alexander zaid" (The Lives of Early Pioneers: Excerpts from Zaid's Diaries), and "Shomer Beyisra'el" (A Guard in Israel).

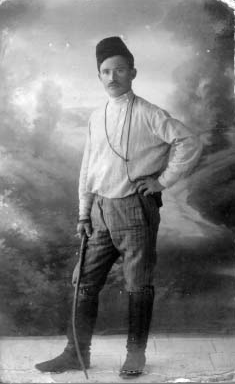
Alexander Zaid in his youth

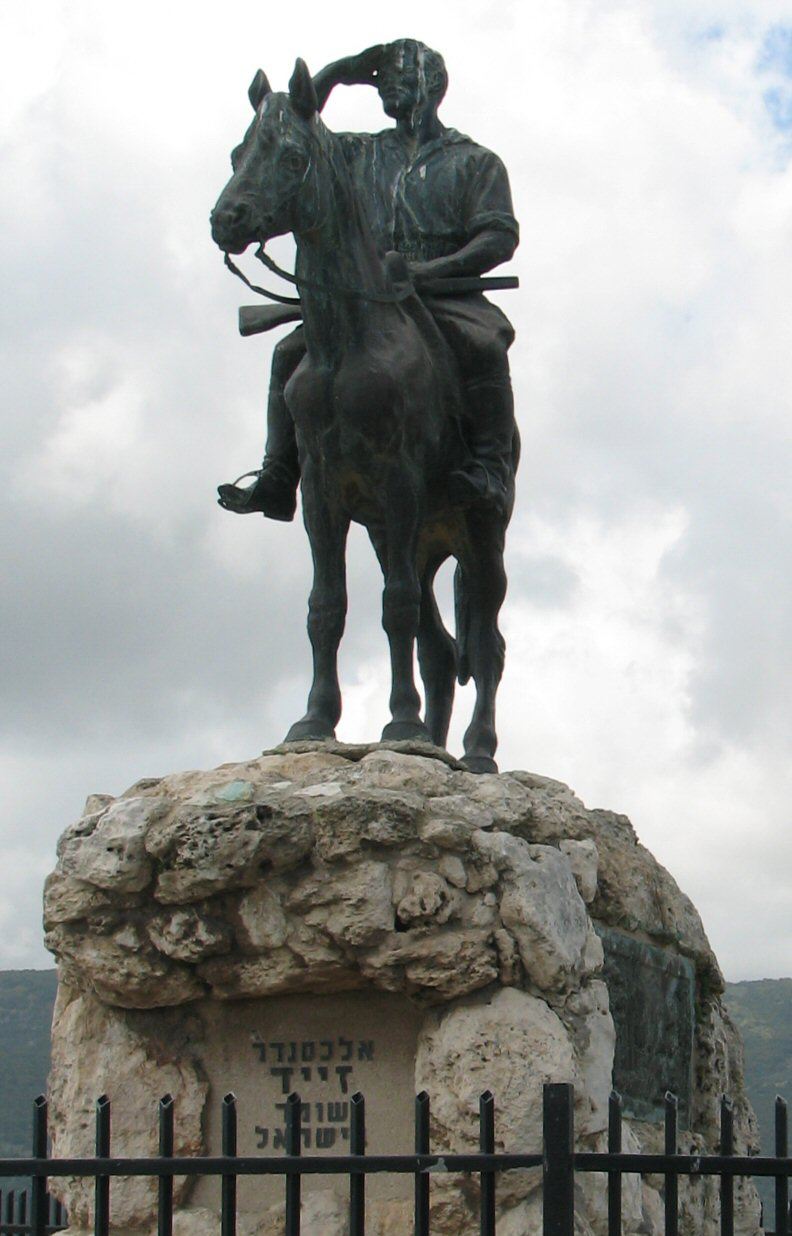
Monument in memory of Zaïd near Beit She'arim national park, statue by David Polus

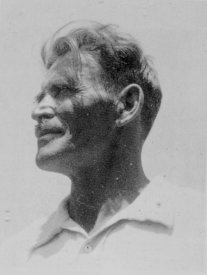
Alexander Zaid posing for a photograph.

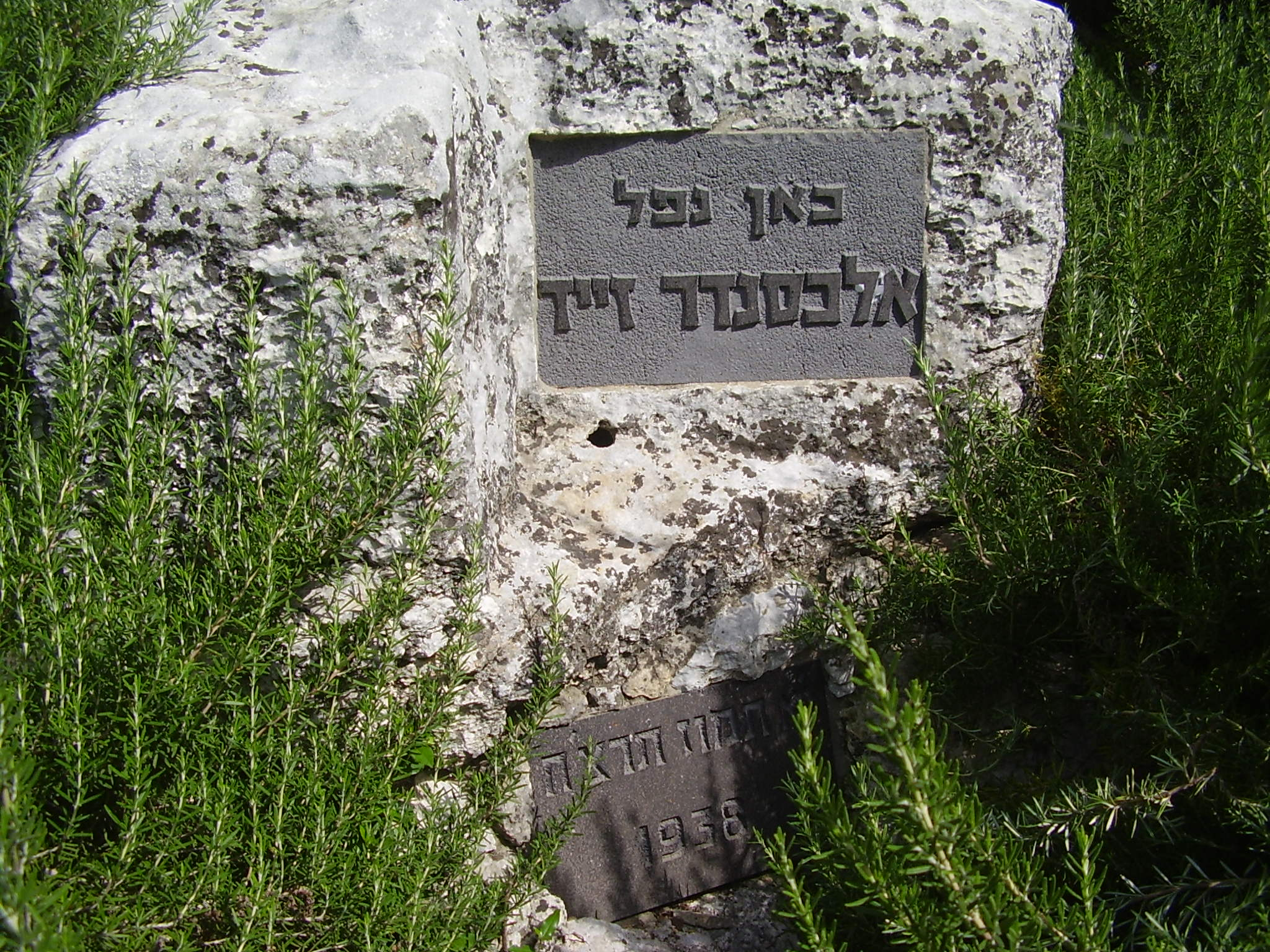
The spot where Alexander Zaid was killed
