= Highway 22 (Israel) =

Highway in Israel

Coordinates: 32°48′02″N 35°02′42″E

Highway 22
- כביש 22
- Bay Highway; Hebrew: נתיבי המפרץ, romanized: Netivey Ha'Mifratz
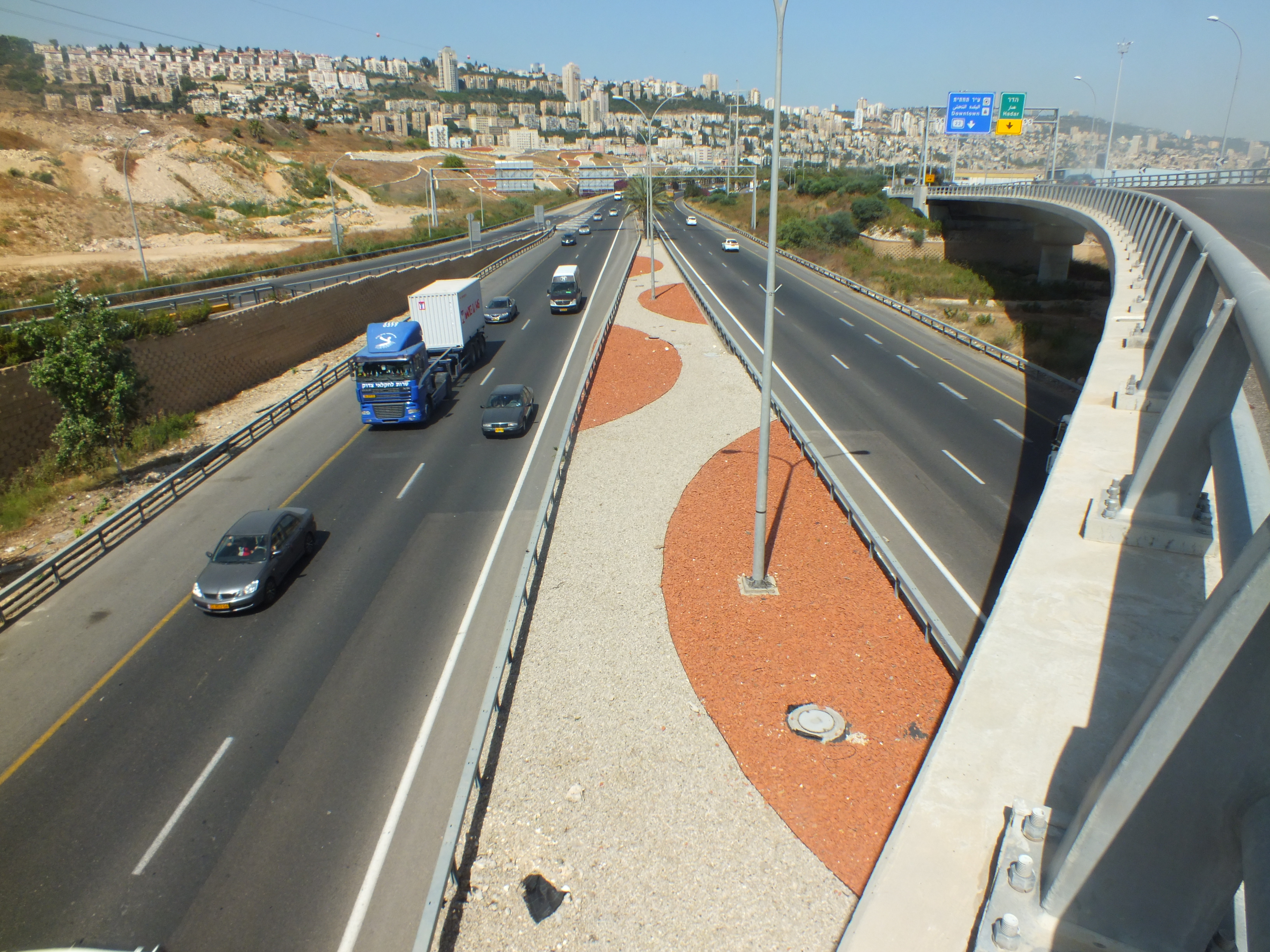

Route information
- Length: 16.79 km (10.43 mi)

Major junctions
- South end: Hiram Interchange
- HaHistadrut Interchange
- North end: Karei Na'aman Interchange

Location
- Country: Israel
- Major cities: Haifa, Kiryat Ata, Kiryat Bialik

Highway system
- Roads in Israel; Highways
← Highway 20	→ Highway 23

Highway 22 (Hebrew: כביש 22), also known as the Bay Highway, is a suburban freeway in the Haifa metropolitan area connecting downtown Haifa with the city's northern exit to the Krayot. From there it continues northwards as a bypass of the Krayot, providing an alternative route to Highway 4.

The highway is divided into two parts:

- The Kishon Road is a 5 km long urban section from the Hiram interchange in downtown Haifa to the Yigael Yadin interchange. The first stage of the Kishon Road was built by Haifa's municipal Yefe Nof company and opened in 2005. The Mevo Carmel Interchange opened on January 12, 2010, eliminating a dangerous railway crossing on the way to the Krayot.
- The Krayot Bypass is a 12 km long suburban section bypassing the Krayot area. There have been plans to create an alternative road to the congested Haifa - Acre road since the 1970s, however financial and bureaucratic issues prevented these plans from being realized for several decades. Shapir Marine and Civil Engineering Ltd. won the tender to construct this part of the highway, work on which commenced in 2010. The entire cost of this segment is estimated at NIS 1.9 billion (approximately US$500 million in 2010 dollars) and was managed by the National Roads Authority. Other works in the vicinity of the highway included the construction of connections from the highway to the Carmel Tunnels and Highway 75 and improvements to Highway 4 from the Karey Na'aman interchange to just south of Acre. The southern part of the Krayot Bypass, from Haifa to the Bialik Interchange was completed mid-September 2012, ahead of schedule. The last section leading to Karei Na'aman Interchange was completed in March 2013. A direct connection between the highway and the Carmel Tunnels (Highway 23) was completed in March 2014.

== Interchanges (South to North) ==
District	Location	km	mi	Name	Destinations	Notes
Haifa	Central Haifa	0.00	0.00	מחלף חירם (Hiram Interchange)	Highway 4	Named after King Hiram
Haifa	Port of Haifa	1.96	1.22	מחלף חוף שמן (Hof Shemen Interchange)	Salman Street; Kheletz Street	
Haifa	Port of Haifa	3.24	2.01	מחלף קישון (Kishon Interchange)	Highway 75	Named after Kishon River
Haifa	Port of Haifa	4.15	2.58	מחלף מבוא כרמל (Mevo Carmel Interchange)	Highway 23; Yigael Yadin Road	
Haifa	East Haifa	5.30	3.29	מחלף ההסתדרות (HaHistadrut Interchange)	Highway 4	Named after Histadrut labor federation
Haifa	Kiryat Ata	7.00	4.35	מחלף אתא דרום (South Ata Interchange)	Route 772	
Haifa	Kfar Bialik	8.90	5.53	מחלף אתא צפון (North Ata Interchange)	Route 781	
Haifa	Kiryat Bialik	12.35	7.67	מחלף ביאליק (Bialik Interchange)	Highway 79	Named after Hayim Nahman Bialik
Haifa	Kiryat Bialik	14.25	8.85	מחלף ביאליק צפון (North Bialik Interchange)	Hen Boulevard	
Haifa	Kfar Masaryk	16.79	10.43	מחלף כרי נעמן (Karei Na'aman Interchange)	Highway 4	
1.000 mi = 1.609 km; 1.000 km = 0.621 mi
