= Highway 41 (Israel) =

Highway in Israel

Coordinates: 31°49′40″N 34°42′37″E

Highway 41
- כביש 41

Route information
- Length: 4.87 km (3.03 mi)

Major junctions
- West end: Entrance to Port of Ashdod
- Namal Ashdod Junction; Nir Galim Junction
- East end: Ashdod Interchange

Location
- Country: Israel
- Major cities: Ashdod

Highway system
- Roads in Israel; Highways
← Highway 40	→ Highway 42

Highway 41 is an arterial road in south-central Israel. It connects Highway 4 and Highway 7 to the Port of Ashdod. The designation "41" also applied to the continuation of the road eastward to Gedera until that section of the road was upgraded and renamed "7".

== Upgrade ==
Within Ashdod, the road has been widened and reoriented. West of the former Hashmal Junction, instead of travelling west-southwest following Nir Galim Rd. and Tel Mor Rd. to Laskov Rd., the road has been rebuilt to continue due west ending at the new entrance to the Ashdod Port. A traffic light-controlled intersection now provides access to Nir Galim Rd to the southwest and a new road northward to Eshkol Power Station and new industrial and commercial zones associated with the port.

East of Ashdod, the highway has undergone reconstruction upgrading it to a controlled-access highway. Traffic-controlled junctions at Highway 4 and Highway 42 have been replaced by multi-level interchanges. Eastward between Highway 4 and Highway 40 the road has been widened, new interchanges built at Beit Rabban and Gedera, and the junction at Kannot Youth Village was eliminated. Upon completion in August 2014, this section of Highway 41 was renumbered "7" directly connecting to the existing Highway 7.

== Junctions and Interchanges (West to East) ==
District	Location	km	mi	Name	Destinations	Notes
Southern	Port of Ashdod	0	0.0	צומת נמל אשדוד (Port of Ashdod Junction)	Entrance road	
Southern	Eshkol Power Station	0.4	0.25	מחלף נמל אשדוד (Port of Ashdod Interchange)	Nir Galim Road	
Southern	Eshkol Power Station	0.75	0.47	צומת חשמל (Hashmal Junction)	HaHashmal Street	
Southern	Ashdod Industrial Zone 3	1.2	0.75	צומת המדע (HaMada Junction)	HaMada Street; Bnei Brit Blvd.	
Central	Nir Galim	2.48	1.54	צומת ניר גלים (Nir Galim Junction)	HaNeft Street	
Central	Bnei Darom	3.2	2.0	צומת בני דרום (Bnei Darom Junction)	Road 4003	
Central	Ashdod	4.87	3.03	מחלף אשדוד (Ashdod Interchange)	Highway 4; Highway 7; Highway 42	
1.000 mi = 1.609 km; 1.000 km = 0.621 mi: Closed/former

== See also ==
- List of highways in Israel
