= Yaacov Ayish =

Israeli diplomat

Maj. Gen. Yaacov Ayish
- יעקב עייש
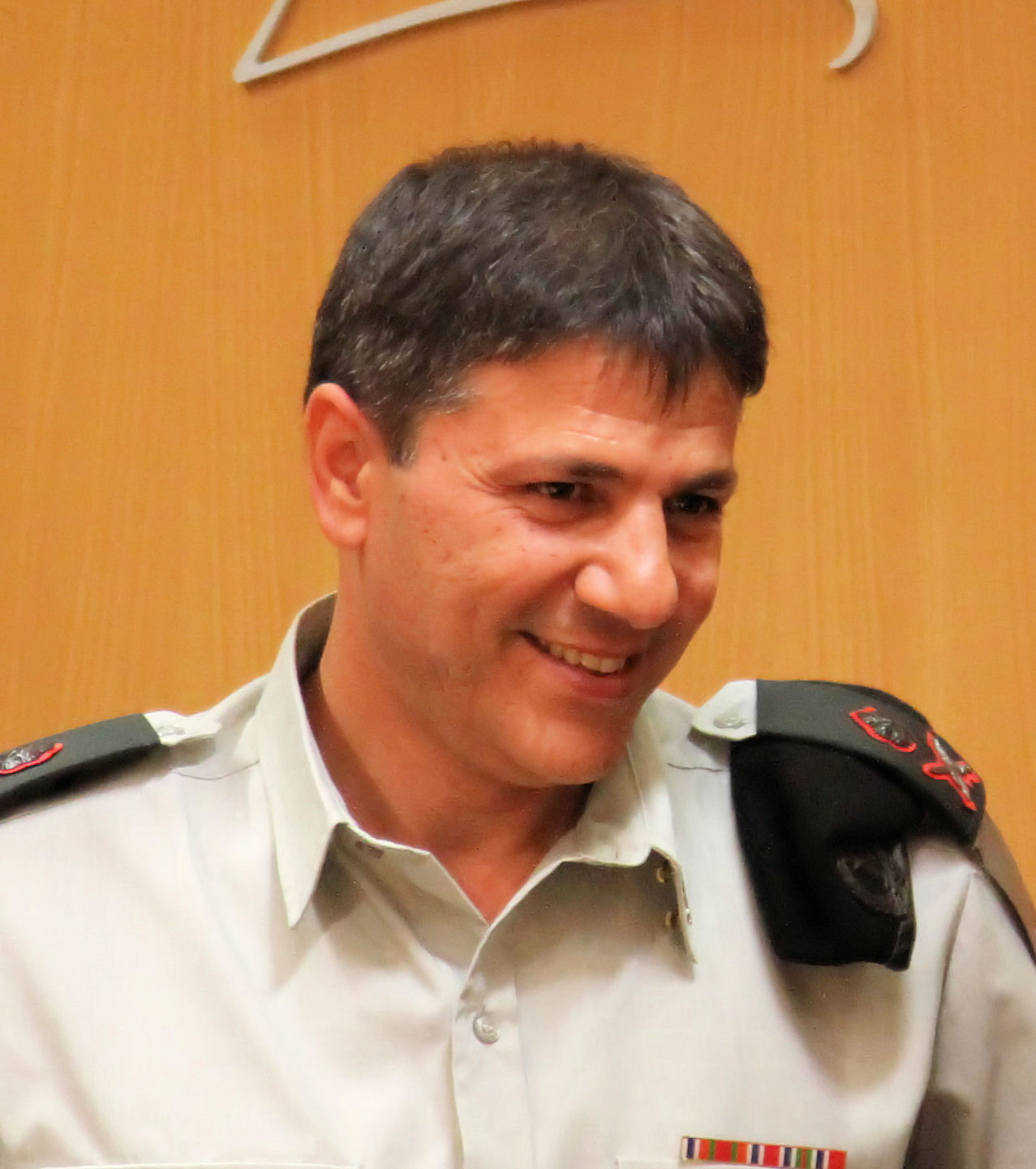
- Israeli Defense Attaché to the United States and Canada
- Born: 1962 December (age 63); Kiryat Tivon
- Spouse: Dalia
- Military career
- Allegiance: Israel
- Branch: Operations Directorate
- Service years: 1981–present
- Rank: Major General
- Commands: 7th Armored Brigade
- Conflicts: Second Intifada Second Lebanon War

Yaacov Ayish (Hebrew: יעקב עייש; born 1962) is the Israeli Defense Attaché to the United States and Canada (2012-). Ayish has served for 30 years in the Israeli Defense Force holding titles such as head of the Operations Branch in the General Staff and Ground Forces Command chief of staff during the Second Lebanon War.

== Early life and education ==
Ayish was born in December 1962 in the town of Kiryat Ti'von. Ayish received a political science degree from Haifa University, a M.A. in business administration from Tel-Aviv University and graduated from the Joint Staff and Command Course conducted by the British Army.

== Military career ==
Yaacov Ayish joined the Israeli Defense Force via the draft in 1981. He initially served in the Armor Corps. Ayish received experience in combat as an officer and company commander. In 1990, Ayish was appointed commander of the 82nd 'Gaash' Armor battalion of the 7th Armor Brigade and was promoted to lieutenant colonel In 1991, he was assigned to deputy brigade commander and operations officer of the 36th 'Gaash' Division in the Northern Command. In 1996, Ayish was promoted to colonel and appointed commander of a reserve armor brigade as well as commander of the Armor and Engineering Training Center at the IDF Northern Command. In 1999, Ayish was assigned as commander of the 7th Brigade in the Golan Heights Northern Command. In 2002 Ayish was again promoted to the head of the Operations Department in the Operations Branch at the General Staff. This period was a critical juncture for the Israeli Defense Force due to the Second Intifada . In 2004 Ayish assumed command of the 319 'Mapatz' Division North Command and promoted to brigadier general. In 2005 during the Second Lebanon War Ayish served as the Ground Forces Command chief of staff. At the conclusion of the assignment he was moved to the head of the 'Et Ha’asif' and Defense efficiency program. The program was executed in tandem with McKinsey and Company. After the program was concluded, Ayish was promoted to major general and assigned as head of Operations branch (J3) in the General Staff. In September 2012 Ayish was assigned to his current position as the Israeli Defense Force attaché to the United States and Canada.

== Israeli Defense Attaché to the United States and Canada ==
On May 31, 2012, on advice from the IDF chief of general staff Benny Gantz Yaacov Ayish was appointed defense attaché to the United States and Canada by Defense Minister Ehud Barak, replacing Gadi Shamni. Since being appointed to this position Ayish has been a prolific speaker lecturing at such locations the United States Senate, West Point, the AIPAC 2015 summit, and Pritzker Military Museum and Library, among others. On July 11, 2014, the Israeli Ambassador Ron Dermer and Defense Attaché Ayish were invited to the United States Senate Foreign Relations, Armed Services and Intelligence committees on Operation Protective Edge Operation Protective Edge was the Israeli defense force's overarching term for operations against targets in Palestine following conflict between Palestine and Israel in July 2014. At West Point Yaacov Ayish discussed the Military Academies Program (MAP) program sponsored by JINSA with the American superintendent of West Point David H. Huntoon At Pritzker Military Museum and Library Yaacov Ayish Spoke at the Symposium on Urban Warfare: Operation, Ethical and Legal Challenges. Ayish participated on a panel discussing the operational challenges of conducting urban moderated by John Allen Williams

== Personal life ==
Yaacov Ayish is married to Dalia and has one daughter and three sons.
