= Highway 42 (Israel) =

Road in Israel

Coordinates: 31°53′17″N 34°45′18″E

Highway 42
- כביש 42

Route information
- Length: 19 km (12 mi)

Major junctions
- North end: Ashdod Junction
- South end: Gan Rave Junction

Location
- Country: Israel

Highway system
- Roads in Israel; Highways
← Highway 41	→ Highway 44

Highway 42 is a north–south highway in central Israel. It leads from just south of Ashdod Interchange in the south to Gan Rave interchange in the north. The road is 19 km (12 mi) long.

== Junctions and interchanges on the highway ==
District	Location	km	mi	Name	Destinations	Notes
Southern	Ashdod	0	0.0	מחלף אשדוד (Ashdod Interchange)	Highway 4; Highway 7; Highway 41	
Central	Ben Zakai	4	2.5	צומת בן זכאי (Ben Zakai Junction)	Road 4102	
Central	Yavne	7	4.3	צומת יבנה (Yavne Junction)	Route 410; Du'ani Street	
Central	Yavne	8	5.0	צומת יבנה (Yavne Junction)	Road 4111	
Central	Kfar HaNagid	10	6.2	צומת כפר הנגיד (Kfar HaNagid Junction)	Entrance Road	
Central	Rehovot	11	6.8	צומת רחובות מערב (Western Rehovot Junction)	Route 411	
Central	Ayanot	12	7.5	צומת עיינות (Ayanot Junction)	Entrance road	
Central	Beit Oved	13	8.1	צומת בית עובד (Beit Oved Junction)	Road 4303	
Central	Beit Hanan	15	9.3	צומת בית חנן (Beit Hanan Junction)	Entrance road	
Central	Rishon Letzion	17	11	מחלף עין הקורא (Ein HaKoreh Interchange)	Route 431; Road 4311	
Central	Rishon Letzion	18	11	מחלף גן רווה (Gan Rave Interchange)	Highway 4 HaHistadrut Street	
1.000 mi = 1.609 km; 1.000 km = 0.621 mi

== See also ==
- List of highways in Israel
