= Highway 9 (Israel) =

Road in Israel

Highway 9
- כביש 9

Route information
- Length: 12.2 km (7.6 mi)

Major junctions
- West end: Cherobim Interchange
- Hadera Forest Junction Hadera South Interchange Habiba Square Interchange (under construction)
- East end: Baqa-Jatt Interchange

Location
- Country: Israel
- Districts: Central District, Haifa District
- Major cities: Hadera, Baqa-Jatt

Highway system
- Roads in Israel; Highways
← Highway 7	→ Highway 10

Highway 9 is an east–west limited-access expressway in Israel that opened to traffic on July 24, 2014.

It has four lanes, two in each direction. It is located south of Hadera, connecting the Trans-Israel Highway, Highway 4, and Highway 2 and was finished July 24, 2014. The maximum speed is 110 km/h. The highway is currently 10.2 km, but if the Baqa-Jatt Interchange is completed it will be 12.2 km long.

== History ==
Highway 9 was approved by the Supreme Court of Israel on October 24, 2010. The purpose of Highway 9 is to connect the Trans-Israel Highway, Highway 4, and Highway 2 in the center of the country. A small part of the route of Highway 9 already existed near the Baqa-Jatt Interchange and was called Highway 61.

On May 2, 2011, the National Roads Company of Israel released a tender for the construction of a four-lane road between Highway 4 and the Trans-Israel Highway at the cost of 700 million NIS with construction being completed in 2014 and Highway 9 being opened to the public on July 24, 2014.

Highway 9 was first built with two lanes in each direction, but preparation includes a future third lane in the center, to avoid damaging the side of the road during construction. Highway 9 includes a diamond interchange south of the city of Hadera, connecting the city to the national road system. In addition, five new bridges were built, two overpasses and three underpasses along Highway 9.

== Junctions & Interchanges ==
District	Location	km	mi	Name	Destinations	Notes
Central	Mikhmoret	0.00	0.00	מחלף חרובים (Cherubim Interchange)	Highway 2	Planned
Central	Hefer Valley	2.00	1.24	צומת יער חדרה (Hadera Forest Junction)	Highway 4	
Central	Elyakhin	5.22	3.24	מחלף חדרה דרום (Hadera South Interchange)	Road 5877	
Haifa	Maor	12.04	7.48	צומת חביבה (Haviva Junction)	Route 581	Under construction
Haifa	Baqa al-Gharbiyye	13.69	8.51	מחלף באקה-ג'ת (Baq'a-Jatt Interchange)	Highway 6	
1.000 mi = 1.609 km; 1.000 km = 0.621 mi: Proposed; Unopened

== See also ==
- List of highways in Israel
