= Highway 4 (Israel) =

Highway in Israel

Highway 4
- כביש 4
- Hebrew: כביש נהריה - אשקלון, romanized: Kvish Nahariyya–Ashqelon; Hebrew: כביש גהה, romanized: Kvish Geha; Hebrew: כביש חיפה - תל אביב הישן, romanized: Kvish Haifa–Tel Aviv HaYashan
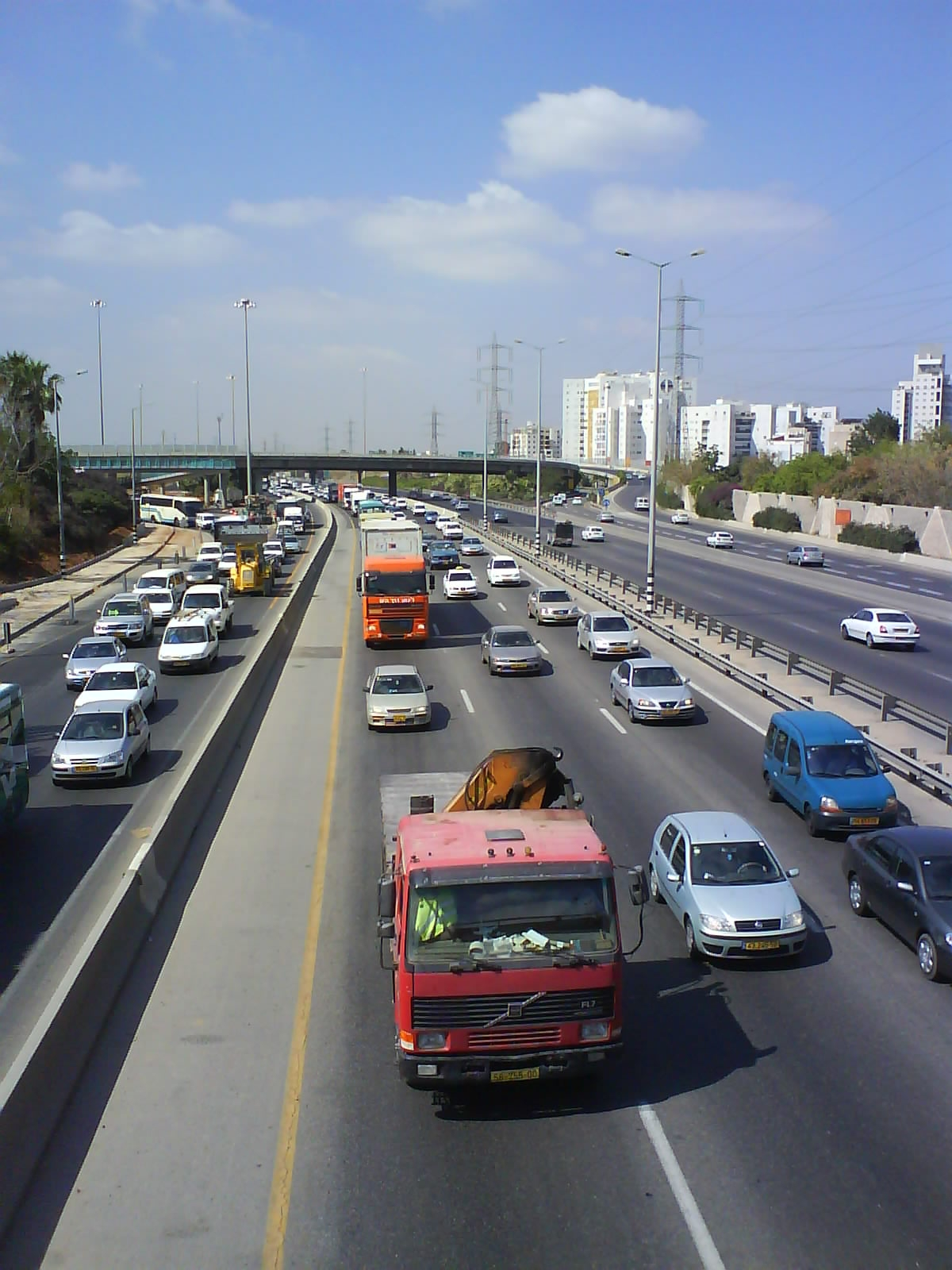
- Heavy morning traffic at Bar Ilan Interchange

Route information
- Part of (Ratified by Palestine but not by Israel)
- Length: 205 km (127 mi)

Major junctions
- South end: Erez Border Crossing with Gaza (Hevel Azzah Junction)
- Yad Mordechai Junction; Berekhya Junction; Abba Hillel Silver Junction; Ashkelon Junction; Ashdod Interchange; Holot Interchange; Gan Rave Interchange; HaShiv'a Interchange; Ganot Interchange; Morasha Interchange; HaSharon (Beit Lid) Junction; Nahal Hadera Junction; Fureidis Junction; Haifa Darom Interchange; Hiram Interchange; Kishon Junction; Afek Junction; Akko Mizrah Junction; Nahariya Junction
- North end: Rosh HaNikra Border Crossing with Lebanon

Location
- Country: Israel
- Major cities: Ashkelon, Ashdod, Yavne, Rishon LeZion, Holon, Tel Aviv, Ramat Gan, Givatayim, Bnei Brak, Petah Tikva, Ramat HaSharon, Hod HaSharon, Kfar Saba, Ra'anana, Netanya, Hadera, Pardes Hanna-Karkur, Zikhron Ya'akov, Tirat Carmel, Haifa, The Kerayot, Acre, Nahariya

Highway system
- Roads in Israel; Highways
← Highway 3	→ Highway 5

Highway 4 (Hebrew: כּֽבִישׁ אַרְבַּע, Kvish Arba' ) is an Israeli highway that runs along Israel's entire coastal plain of the Mediterranean Sea, from the Rosh HaNikra border crossing with Lebanon in the North to the Erez Border Crossing with the Gaza Strip in the South. The highway follows in part the route of the ancient Via Maris.

Until the 1990s and the withdrawal of Israel Defense Forces from most of the Gaza Strip due to the Oslo Accords, Highway 4 extended south all the way to Rafah and the Egyptian border. Since the 1990s, the part of the highway in the Gaza Strip has been renamed as Salah al-Din Road.

Although the highway is continuous, it is generally considered to be divided into five sections, each with its own nickname and characteristics such as a differing number of lanes and speed limits:

- Northern Coastal Highway (Rosh Hanikra–Haifa). This section passes through the Krayot, Acre and Nahariya in Northern Israel. The southern third of the highway bisects the densely populated Krayot area and frequently experienced heavy traffic congestion until Highway 22, a bypass freeway located several kilometers to the east of Highway 4 was constructed in the early 2010s.
- Haifa–Tel Aviv Highway (Haifa–Ra'anana). Commonly referred to in Israel as The Old Highway (Hebrew: הכביש הישן; כביש חיפה - תל אביב עם רמזורים) while Highway 2 is sometimes called The New Highway. The construction of this section started in the early 1930s, and by 1936, it had reached Khirbat Bayt Lid. During the 1936–39 Arab revolt in Palestine, the construction speed greatly increased in order to allow Jewish traffic from Tel Aviv and Petah Tikva to Haifa to bypass the Arab towns of Qalqilyah, Tulkarm and Jenin. The highway opened to traffic on 30 September 1937, reducing the travel distance between Tel Aviv and Haifa from 140 to 106 km. The distance was further reduced to 96 km by 1942, when a direct road opened between Hadera and Binyamina bypassing Pardes Hanna.
- Geha Highway, or First President Road (Ra'anana–Azor). This functions as an important arterial road in the eastern portion of the Tel Aviv Metropolitan Area. Designed as a shortcut to replace the southern section of the Old Haifa–Tel Aviv Highway, the construction of Geha Highway started in 1951, and was completed in 1968. The replaced section of the Old Highway was then re-designated as the northern section of Highway 40, and later in 2002, as Highway 402.
- Tel Aviv–Ashdod Highway (Azor–Ashdod) was constructed in the early 1970s to relieve congestion on Highway 42, caused by the freight traffic to the Port of Ashdod which opened in 1965.
- Southern Coastal Highway (Ashdod–Erez Crossing) is the oldest section of the highway: a road along this route had existed since before the Second World War.

The Tel Aviv–Ashdod and Geha sections are freeways. The rest of the highway consists of multiple lanes in each direction except between Erez Crossing and Yad Mordechai, Rosh HaNikra and Nahariya, and between Tirat Carmel just south of Haifa and Fureidis, which have a single lane of traffic in each direction. While there have been multiple proposals to widen the Haifa–Fureidis section, these have so far been blocked due to opposition from nearby residents who would like the highway in the area to retain its current rural character.

== Recent, current and planned construction ==
External videos
- Netivei Yisrael video (YouTube) – Renderings of the freeway upgrade project in the Sharon region

In 2014, the new Dror interchange between route 4 and route 553 was inaugurated.

As of 2016, Netivei Yisrael is planning a multi-billion Shekel project to convert the Sharon section of the highway (between the Dror Interchange and Highway 65 north of Hadera) into a freeway. The project includes a massive interchange at the junction with Highway 57 and a long cut-and-cover tunnel with a road and intersections above it at the entrance to Hadera to separate local and intercity traffic.

== Junctions and interchanges ==
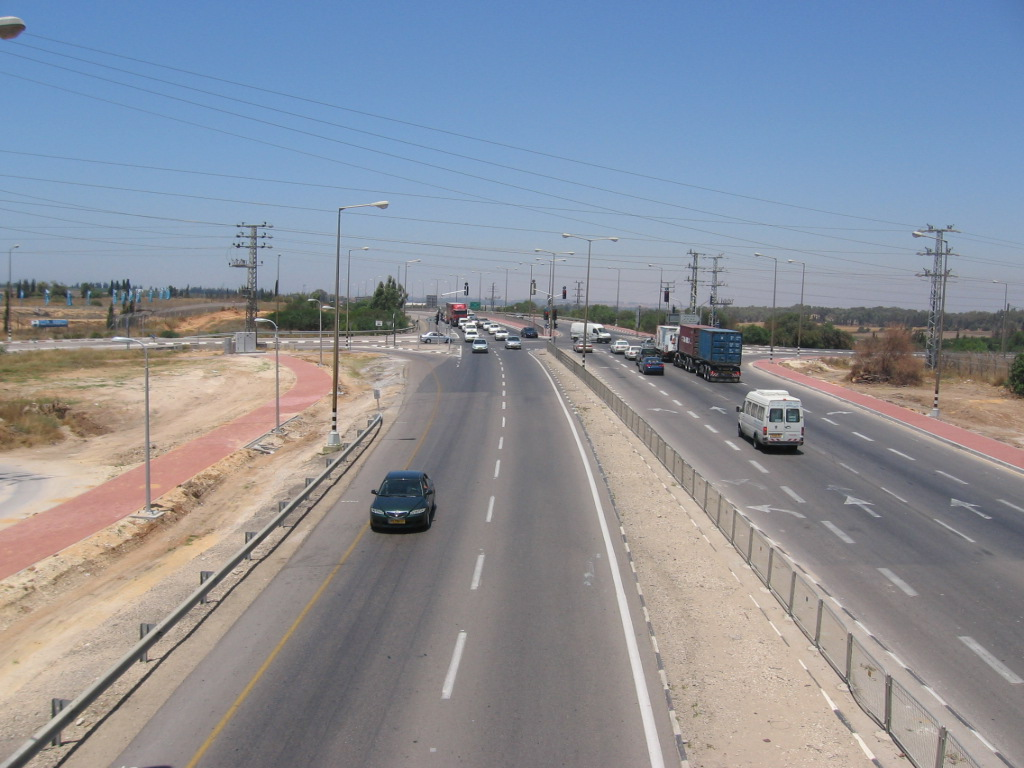
Abba Hillel Silver Junction

External videos
- Highway 4 video journey – driving on the Southern portion of the highway, from the Erez border crossing to just south of the Morasha Interchange (Highway 5).

km	Name	Type	Meaning	Location	Road(s) crossed
Southern Coastal Highway
0	צומת חבל עזה (Hevel 'Azza Junction)	Palestine	Gaza Strip	Erez border crossing	local road
1	צומת נתיב העשרה (Netiv HaAsara Junction)		Named after location	Netiv HaAsara	Highway 25
4	צומת יד מרדכי (Yad Mordechai; Junction)		Named after location	Yad Mordechai	Highway 34
6	צומת זיקים (Zikim Junction)		Named after location	Zikim	Road 3411
8	צומת מבקיעים (Mavki'im Junction)		Named after location	Mavki'im	local road
9	צומת אשקלון דרום (Ashkelon Darom Junction)		Ashkelon South	Ashkelon	Bar-Lev Blvd.
11	צומת בת הדר (Bat Hadar Junction)		Named after location	Bat Hadar	local road
12	צומת בית שיקמה (Beit Shikma Junction)		Named after nearby Beit Shiqma	Beit Shikma	Road 3412
13	צומת אשקלון (Ashkelon Junction)		Named after location	Ashkelon	Ben Gurion Blvd.
14	צומת ברכיה (Berekhya Junction)		Named after location	Berekhya	Highway 35
15	צומת אבא הלל (Abba Hillel Junction)		Named after Abba Hillel Silver	Kfar Silver	Highway 3
15.5				Ashkelon (North)	Menachem Begin Blvd.
21	צומת אשכולות (Eshkolot Junction)		Named after nearby Eshkolot Farm	Nitzanim	Route 232
22	צומת ניצנים (Nitzanim Junction)		Named after location	Nitzan	Road 3631
24	צומת בית עזרא (Beit Ezra Junction)		Named after location	Beit Ezra	HaEla St.
25	צומת אמונים (Emunim Junction)		Named after nearby Emunim	Ezer	Road 3711
27	צומת שדה עוזיהו (Sede uziyahu junction)		Named after location	Sde Uziyahu	Road 3712
27	צומת עד הלום (Ad Halom Junction)		Named after location	Ashdod (Ad Halom Industrial Area)	local road
29	מחלף עד הלום (Ad Halom Interchange)		Ashdod South	Ashdod	Menachem Begin Blvd.
30	צומת גן יבנה (Gan Yavne Junction)		Named after location	Gan Yavne	Menachem Begin Blvd.
Tel Aviv–Ashdod Highway (Ashdod interchange - Morasha interchange freeway)
36	מחלף אשדוד (Ashdod Interchange)		Named after location	Port of Ashdod	Highway 7 Highway 41; Highway 42 local road
44	מחלף יבנה (Yavne Interchange)		Named after location	Yavne	Road 4111
51	מחלף חולות (Holot Interchange)		Sand Dunes	Rishon LeZion only from/to south	Highway 20
53	מחלף ראשון דרום (Rishon Darom Interchange)		South Rishon LeZion	Rishon LeZion	Highway 431
55	מחלף גן רווה (Gan Rave Interchange)		Named after nearby Gan Raveh; Regional Council	Rishon LeZion	Highway 42
57	מחלף ראשון לציון (Rishon LeZion; Interchange)		Named after location	Rishon LeZion	Route 441
60	מחלף חולון מזרח (Holon Mizrah Interchange)		East Holon	Holon, Rishon LeZion	Jerusalem Blvd.
61	מחלף השבעה (HaShiv'a Interchange)		Named after location	Mishmar HaShiv'a	Highway 44
62	מחלף גנות (Ganot Interchange)		Named after location	Ganot	Highway 1
63	מחלף מסובים (Mesubim Interchange)		Named after Kfar Mesubim, a past ma'abara at the location	Ramat Ef'al	Route 461
65	מחלף אלוף שדה (Aluf Sadeh Interchange)		Named after Aluf Yitzhak Sadeh	Ramat Gan	Aluf Sadeh St.
66	מחלף בר-אילן (Bar Ilan Interchange)		Named after nearby Bar-Ilan University	Ramat Gan	Route 471
67	מחלף גבעת שמואל (Giv'at Shmuel Interchange)		Named after location	Giv'at Shmuel, Bnei Brak	Mivtza Kadesh St.
69	מחלף גהה (Geha Interchange)		Named after Geha Hospital torn down to build interchange	Petah Tikva	Route 481 (Jabotinski Road)
70	מחלף אם המושבות (Em HaMoshavot Interchange)		Named after intersecting street	Petah Tikva, Bnei Brak	Route 482 (Em HaMoshavot Rd.)
73	מחלף מורשה (Morasha Interchange)		Named after location	Ramat Hasharon	Highway 5
Haifa–Tel Aviv Highway
78	מחלף רעננה-כפר סבא דרום (Ra'anana Darom Interchange)		South Ra'anana	Ra'anana, Kfar Saba	Route 554 (Tchernichovsky St.) to Route 531
78	צומת רעננה (Ra'anana Junction)		Named after location	Ra'anana, Kfar Saba	Route 541 (Ahuza St.); Route 402 (HaShalom Rd.)
80	מחלף רעננה-כפר סבא צפון (Ra'anana-Kfar Saba Tzafon; Interchange)		Named after location	Ra'anana, Kfar Saba	Begin Blvd. Weizmann St.
83	מחלף בצרה (Batzra Interchange)		Named after location	Batzra	Kibbutz Galuyot St.
84	צומת בני ציון (Bnei Zion Junction)		Named after location	Bnei Zion	Road 5511
86	מחלף הדרים (Hadarim Interchange)		Citrus fruit	Tel Mond	Route 551
88	מחלף דרור (Dror Interchange)		Named after location	Bnei Dror, Even Yehuda	Route 553
91	צומת הדסים (Hadasim Junction)		Named after location	Kadima-Tzoran, Hadassim Youth Village, Even Yehuda	Herzl St.
94	צומת פרדסיה (Pardesiya Junction)		Named after location	Pardesiya	Road 5613 (HaNassi Blvd.)
96	צומת השרון (HaSharon Junction)		Named after Sharon Plain	Nordia	Highway 57
98	צומת רופין (Rupin Junction)		Named after location	Ruppin Academic Center, Kfar Monash	Road 5711
99	צומת העוגן (Ha'Ogen Junction)		Named after location	HaOgen, Ma'abarot	Road 5700
102	צומת חפר (Hefer Junction)		Named after Hefer Valley	Kfar Vitkin	Road 5720
104	צומת הרואה (Haroeh Junction)		Named after location	Kfar Haroeh	Route 581
106	צומת יער חדרה (Ya'ar Hadera Junction)		Hadera Forest	Hefer Valley	Highway 9
109	צומת חדרה (Hadera Junction)		Named after location	Hadera	Shimoni St, Herbert Samuel St.
111	צומת חרושת (Haroshet Junction)		Factory	Hadera	HaShalom St.
113	צומת נחל חדרה (Nahal Hadera Junction)		Hadera River	Hadera	Highway 65
115	צומת פל ים (Pal-Yam Junction)		Named after location	Caesarea	Route 651
117	צומת אור עקיבא (Or Akiva Junction)		Named after location	Or Akiva	Weizman Blvd.
119	צומת בנימינה (Binyamina Junction)		Named after location	Binyamina, Or Akiva	Route 653
121	צומת בית חנניה (Beit Hanania Junction)		Named after location	Beit Hanania	Road 6531
124	מחלף מעגן מיכאל (Ma'agan Michael Interchange)		Named after location	Ma'agan Michael	local road
125	צומת זכרון יעקב (Zikhron Ya'akov Junction)		Named after location	Zikhron Ya'akov	Nili Blvd.
128	צומת פוריידיס (Fureidis Junction)		Named after location	Fureidis, Zikhron Ya'akov	Highway 70
129	צומת נחשולים (Nahsholim Junction)		Named after location	Nahsholim	Road 7011
132	צומת עין איילה (Ein Ayala Junction)		Named after location	Ein Ayala	HaRimon St.
133	צומת עופר (Ofer Junction)		Named after location	Ofer, Kerem Maharal	Road 7021
134	צומת צרופה (Tzrufa Junction)		Named after location	Tzrufa	local road
136	צומת גבע כרמל (Geva Carmel Junction)		Named after location	Geva Carmel	local road
137	צומת עין כרמל (Ein Carmel Junction)		Named after location	Ein Carmel	local road
140	צומת עין הוד (Ein Hod Junction)		Named after location	Ein Hod	Road 7111
142	צומת אורן (Oren Junction)		Named after nearby kibbutz Beit Oren	Atlit	Road 7110, Route 721
143	צומת מגדים (Megadim Junction)		Named after location	Megadim	local road
145	צומת החותרים (HaHoterim Junction)		Named after location	HaHotrim	local road
147	צומת טירת כרמל (Tirat Carmel Junction)		Named after location	Tirat Carmel	Jabotinski St.
147	צומת כפר גלים (Kfar Galim Junction)		Named after location	Kfar Galim	local road
151	מחלף חיפה דרום (Haifa Darom Interchange)		South Haifa	Haifa; MATA"M Industrial Park	Highway 2 Highway 23
Northern Coastal Highway
153	צומת דרך הים (Dereh HaYam Junction)		Road of the Sea (Via Maris)	Haifa; Ramat Haviv	Route 672; Etzel Street
156	מחלף אלנבי (Allenby Interchange)		Named after intersecting street	Haifa; German Colony, Wadi Nisnas	Allenby Road
160	מחלף חירם (Hiram Interchange)		King Hiram I	Haifa; Hadar HaCarmel only from/to southbound	Highway 22 (Kishon Road)
162	מחלף גשר פז (Gesher Paz Interchange)		Paz Bridge	Haifa; Neve Yosef, Neve Sha'anan	HaHashmal St.
162	מחלף גדוד 21 (Gedud 21 Interchange)		21st Battalion	Haifa to Technion	HaHashmal St.
163	מחלף הקריות / צ'קפוסט (HaKerayot Interchange/ Checkpost)		Krayot (British) Checkpost	Haifa, Nesher	Route 752
164	מחלף קישון (Kishon Interchange)		Kishon River	Haifa	Highway 75
167	צומת וולקן (Vulcan Junction)			Haifa Airport	Moshe Dayan Road
168	מחלף מוטה גור (Motta Gur Interchange)		Named after Motta Gur	Kiryat Haim, Kiryat Ata	Halutzei HaTa'asiya St., HaDshanim St., Haifa Road
169	צומת קרית חיים (Kiryat Haim Junction)		Named after location	Kiryat Haim, Kiryat Ata	Ahi Eilat Blvd., HaAmakim St. to Route 781 (Bialik St.)
170	צומת השופטים (HaShoftim Junction)		Book of Judges	Kiryat Bialik, Kiryat Motzkin	Jerusalem Blvd., Goshen Blvd.
171	צומת העשור (HaAsor Junction)		Decade	Kiryat Bialik, Kiryat Motzkin	Ben-Gurion Blvd., Weizman Blvd.
173	צומת אפק (Afek Junction)		Tel Afek	Kiryat Bialik	Highway 79
173	צומת עין אפק (Ein Afek Junction)		Ein Afek	Kiryat Bialik	Road 7911
173.7				Kiryat Bialik	Giora St. Gush Halav St.
174	צומת צור שלום (Tzur Shalom Junction)		Named after location	Kiryat Bialik	Jerusalem Blvd.
174.3				Kiryat Bialik, Kiryat Bialik; Industrial Zone	Hen Blvd.
175.7				Kiryat Bialik, Kiryat Bialik; Industrial Zone	Yosef Levi Blvd.
176	מחלף כרי נעמן (Karei Na'aman Interchange)		Named after Karei Na'aman; Nature Reserve	Kiryat Bialik, Kfar Masaryk	Highway 22 (Krayot Bypass)
177	צומת כפר מסריק (Kfar Masaryk Junction)		Named after location	Kfar Masaryk	local road
179	צומת עין המפרץ (Ein HaMifratz Junction)		Named after location	Ein HaMifratz, Akko	David Remez St.
181	צומת עכו מזרח (Akko Mizrah Junction)		East Akko	Akko	Highway 85
184	צומת שומרת (Shomrat Junction)		Named after location	Akko	Road 8510
186	צומת לוחמי הגטאות (Lohamei HaGeta'ot Junction)		Named after location	Lohamei HaGeta'ot	local road
188	צומת רגבה (Regba Junction)		Named after location	Regba; Shavei Tzion	Road 8611 (HaIrus St.)
188.4				Mazra'a	local road
189	צומת עברון (Evron Junction)		Named after location	Nahariya	Zalman Shazar St.
189.8				Nahariya, Evron	Isi laMolino Street
190.8				Nahariya, Evron	Irit Street
191	צומת נהריה (Nahariya Junction)		Named after location	Nahariya	Highway 89
191.2	northbound only			Nahariya	Derech Yechi'am
191.3				Nahariya	HaMiyasdim Street
192				Nahariya	Har Tabor Street
193.3				Nahariya	Masryk Street
192.6				Nahariya	Trumpeldor Street
193.1				Nahariya	Har Meron Street
193.4				Nahariya	David Ben Gaon Street
193.5	צומת סער (Sa'ar Junction)			Sa'ar	local road
194.3				Nahariya North; Industrial Zone	HaYotzrim Street
195.2				Nahariya North; Industrial Zone	local road
197.7	צומת גשר הזיו (Gesher HaZiv Junction)		Named after location	Gesher HaZiv	local road
198.1				Achziv Beach; National Park	local road
200.3	צומת לימן (Liman Junction)		Named after location	Liman	HaTamar St.
200.7				Achziv Milu'ot; Industrial Zone	local road
201.7	צומת בצת (Betzet Junction)		Named after location	Betzet	Route 899
203.7	צומת ראש הנקרה (Rosh HaNikra Junction)		Named after location	Rosh HaNikra	local road
205.2	מעבר הגבול ראש הנקרה (Rosh HaNikra; Border Crossing)	Lebanon	Named after location	Rosh HaNikra grottoes	
