= Highway 73 (Israel) =

Highway in Israel

Coordinates: 32°39′40″N 35°15′50″E

Highway 73
- כביש 73
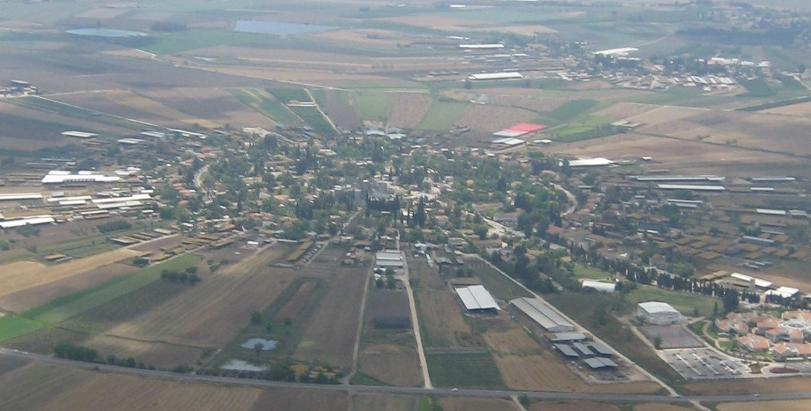
- Route 73 at the bottom of the picture near Nahalal

Route information
- Length: 11.6 km (7.2 mi)

Major junctions
- West end: Nahalal Junction
- Barukh Junction
- East end: Adashim junction

Location
- Country: Israel
- Major cities: Migdal HaEmek

Highway system
- Roads in Israel; Highways
← Highway 71	→ Highway 75

Highway 73 is a highway in the Jezreel Valley in northern Israel. It proceeds from the Nahalal junction in the west toward the Adashim junction in the east. It is 12 km long.

== History ==
With the establishment of Gvat and Sarid and settlement in the area of the Sharon Group and the Ayanot Group (which later established Ramat David) in 1926, representatives of the localities began to demand that the government pave the road that would connect the new localities to Afula-Nazareth Road and Haifa-Nazareth Road. The first section of the road, which connected Route 60 with Ginegar, was paved in 1930.

Before it was paved, passengers used the road's route from Jerusalem and Tel Aviv to Haifa to bypass Nazareth. Towards the end of 1934, an agreement was reached between the government and the surrounding localities on the construction of the road between Ginegar and Nahalal, but in July 1935 the governor of the Nazareth district announced that the construction would be delayed for budgetary reasons. Haim Gvati hypothesized that the lack of paving of the road stems from the desire to prevent the diversion of traffic to Haifa from passing through Nazareth in a way that could harm trade in the city. Preliminary work to pave the road began in early 1936. With the outbreak of the Arab Revolt, pressure increased from the Jewish community to pave the road due to attacks on vehicles of Jews passing through Nazareth. In August 1936 the High Commissioner issued an official statement that the road was defined as a public project for land expropriation. The work was handed over to Solel Boneh and the paving of the road began in September 1936. The settlers in the surrounding localities participated in paving the road, for which they purchased a truck, which later became known thanks to the children's song "Our big green car" (version of Vi gå över daggstänkta berg).

In November 1936, the work was stopped due to the rains, and it was renewed in March 1937, and the road was completed in July 1937. The road was paved at a width of 5.5 meters and a length of 11.6 kilometres. In March 1938, repairs were made to the road near kibbutz Sarid.

Initially, there was talk of paving a 3-meter-wide road for 3,000 pounds, with the localities participating in half the cost. Later, however, it was decided on a 5.5-meter-wide road for 17,500 pounds, and the government demanded that the localities participate in 5,000 pounds. On the advice of Moshe Sharett, the localities agreed, as part of the amount was promised by other localities in the area that also benefited from the paving of the road.

== Junctions & Interchanges (West to East) ==
District	Location	km	mi	Name	Destinations	Notes
Northern	Nahalal	0.00	0.00	צומת נהלל (Nahalal Junction)	Highway 75; Road 7626	
Northern	Nahalal	0.50	0.31	מסעף נהלל (Nahalal Branch)	Entrance to Nahalal	
Northern	Ramat David	2.50	1.55	צומת רמת דוד (Ramat David Junction)	Entrance to Ramat David	
Northern	Gvat	3.44	2.14	צומת גבת (Gvat Junction)	Entrance to Gvat	
Northern	Yifat	4.11	2.55	צומת יפעת (Yifat Junction)	Entrance to Yifat	
Northern	Sarid	5.39	3.35	צומת שריד (Sarid Junction)	Entrance to Sarid	
Northern	Migdal HaEmek	6.34	3.94	צומת ברוך (Barukh Junction)	Road 7255	
Northern	Ginegar	8.32	5.17	צומת גניגר (Ginegar Junction)	Entrance to Ginegar	
Northern	Tel Adashim	11.60	7.21	צומת עדשים (Adashim Junction)	Highway 60	
1.000 mi = 1.609 km; 1.000 km = 0.621 mi

== See also ==
- List of highways in Israel
