= Highway 7 (Israel) =

Highway in Israel

Coordinates: 31°48′03″N 34°46′41″E

Highway 7
- כביש 7

Route information
- Length: 13.64 km (8.48 mi)

Major junctions
- West end: Ashdod Interchange
- Beit Rabban Junction; Gedera Interchange
- East end: Sorek Interchange

Location
- Country: Israel
- Districts: Southern, Central
- Major cities: Ashdod, Beit Rabban, Kannot, Gedera, Yad Binyamin

Highway system
- Roads in Israel; Highways
← Highway 6	→ Highway 9

Highway 7 is a highway in the South District of Israel from Ashdod to Yad Binyamin. It connects the Port of Ashdod with the Trans-Israel Highway (Highway 6).

== Upgrade ==
The road was rebuilt to include additional lanes and interchanges to create a continuous controlled-access highway between Ashdod Interchange with Highway 4 in the west and Highway 3 in the east. Upon completion in August 2014, the section previously numbered Highway 41 between Highway 4 and Highway 40 was renumbered "7".

== Junctions (West to East) ==
District	Location	km	mi	Name	Destinations	Notes
Southern	Ashdod	0.00	0.00	מחלף אשדוד (Ashdod Interchange)	Highway 4; Highway 41; Highway 42	
Central	Beit Rabban	2.40	1.49	צומת בית רבן (Beit Rabban Junction)	Road 4000; Road 4102	
Central	Kannot	5.10	3.17	צומת כנות (Kannot Junction)	local road	Closed in 2014
Central	Gedera	6.18	3.84	מחלף גדרה (Gedera Interchange)	Highway 40	Presumed biblical location (probably incorrect)
Central	Yad Binyamin	12.89	8.01	מחלף שורק (Sorek Interchange)	Highway 6	Named after nearby Brook of Sorek
Central	Yad Binyamin	13.64	8.48	מחלף שורק (Sorek Interchange)	Highway 3	
1.000 mi = 1.609 km; 1.000 km = 0.621 mi: Closed/former

== See also ==
- List of highways in Israel
