= Kfar Tikvah =

Israeli village for people with disabilities

Coordinates: 32.7013°N 35.1150°E

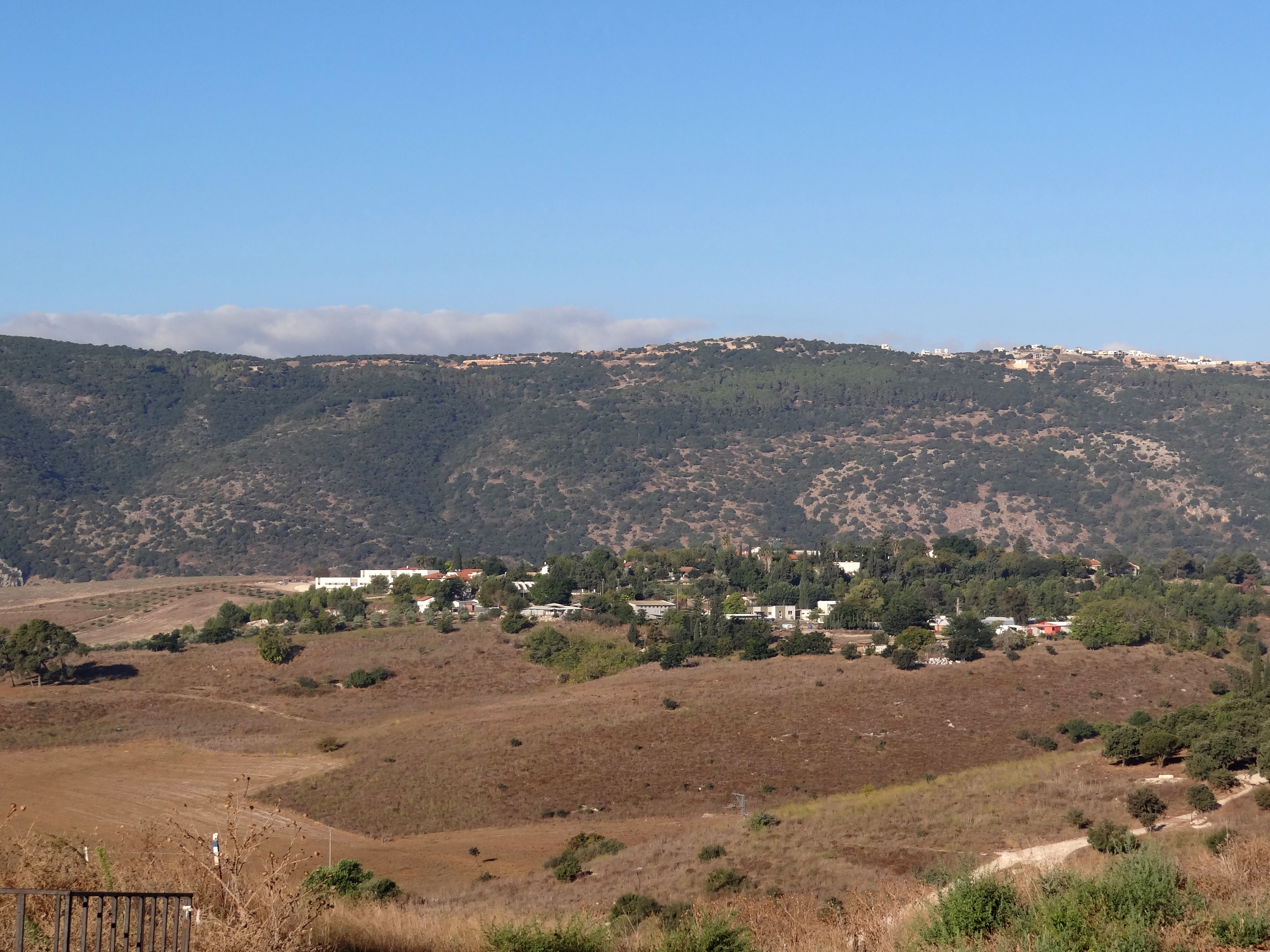
Kfar Tikvah

Kfar Tikvah (Hebrew: כפר תקוה, in English means: Village of Hope) is a kibbutz-style village near Kiryat Tiv'on, Israel for people with disabilities .

== History ==
Kfar Tikvah was founded in 1963 under the leadership of Sigfried Hirsch by a group of Israelis on the top of a mountain near Kiryat Tiv'on. With the help of German volunteers from a German association and with the help of some German donors, they started to implement the vision of the founders in the same year. The establishment was inaugurated in 1964.

== Idea ==
Sigfried Hirsch and his co-workers founded Kfar Tikvah on the site of the abandoned Kibbutz Givat Zaid. Here Hirsch's idea of disabled people living like other people became a reality: "They should live like us!" he declared at the inauguration ceremony. Kfar Tikvah today sees itself as a kibbutz of a special kind even though it does not belong to the kibbutz movement. The disabled people of the village consider themselves kibbutz members and assume, as far as possible, tasks and duties for the community. Since the construction of the village on the site of the former Kibbutz Givat Zaid, which took place in 1963 with the help of German volunteers, Kfar Tikvah has become something of a sign of German-Israeli relations.

== Structure ==
Basically, the structure of the village corresponds to that of a kibbutz. The management consists of parents or ward representatives, employees and representatives of the disabled. This is the main difference from other facilities. In Kfar Tikvah, the disabled people have a right to speak, also on a leadership level. Their elected representatives have the right of co-determination and co-decision on occupational matters, community projects, and acceptance of new members.

== Work ==
Kfar Tikvah provides jobs for 200 disabled people. In addition to daily work in gardening, laundry and housekeeping, the business enterprises on the grounds of the village offer additional job opportunities.

== Business operations ==
Kfar Tikvah runs a winery, a dog breeding farm and a candle factory. Residents of the village work in these businesses. A ceramic workshop has also opened.

== Learning ==
Kfar Tikvah was the first disabled facility to convince the University of Haifa to offer its educational programs for the disabled. Since then, the university has been using the program for the training of students in social professions and offers the chaverim (members) and their families the opportunity to work out an individual learning program together. In this way, a unique project that benefits both sides, the university and its students in training and Kfar Tikvah, was created by the special support of its members.

== German-Israeli cooperation ==
Without this cooperation Kfar Tikvah would not have been conceivable. They were German volunteers from the association, which in 1963 designed the buildings of the former Kibbutz Givat Shaul for the disabled. Since then, Kfar Tikvah has been an active and special sign of German-Israeli and Christian-Jewish cooperation. Here, German, Israeli, Jewish and Christian volunteers work together with the other chaverim (members). This cooperation is repeatedly appreciated by the visit of the German delegations and the German foreign affairs minister.
