= Beit Zaid =

Beit Zaid: בית זייד (Hebrew)
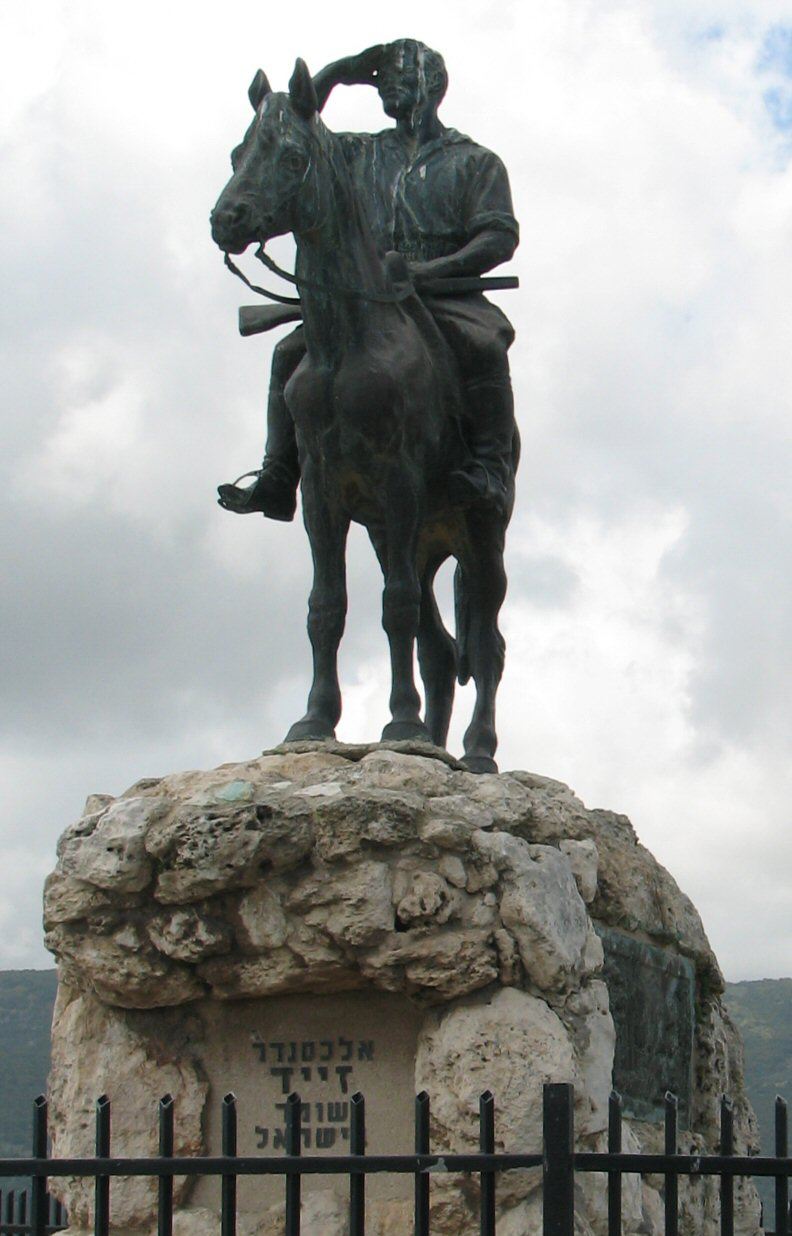

- Location within Jezreel Valley region of Israel Location within Israel
- Coordinates: 32°42′9″N 35°7′54″E
- Country: Israel
- District: Northern
- Subdistrict: Jezreel
- Council: Jezreel Valley
- Founded: 1951
- Founder: Former residents of Giv'ot Zaid
- Population (2024): 84

Beit Zaid (Hebrew: בֵּית זַיִיד, lit. 'House of Zaid') is a moshav in northern Israel. Located near Kiryat Tiv'on, it falls under the jurisdiction of Jezreel Valley Regional Council. In 2024 it had a population of 84.

== History ==
The area was first settled in 1926 by Alexander Zaïd, one of the founders of Hashomer, his wife and four children. In 1940 a new kibbutz, Giv'ot Zaid (named for Zaïd) was founded to the north of Zaïd's former residence (he had been murdered in 1938) and was joined by several members of Zaïd's family. However, it collapsed in 1950. In 1951 the former residents of Giv'ot Zaid moved to the site inhabited by the family and founded Beit Zaid.
