= Yiddishpiel =

Yiddish theatre in Tel Aviv, Israel

Coordinates: 32.0733°N 34.7710°E

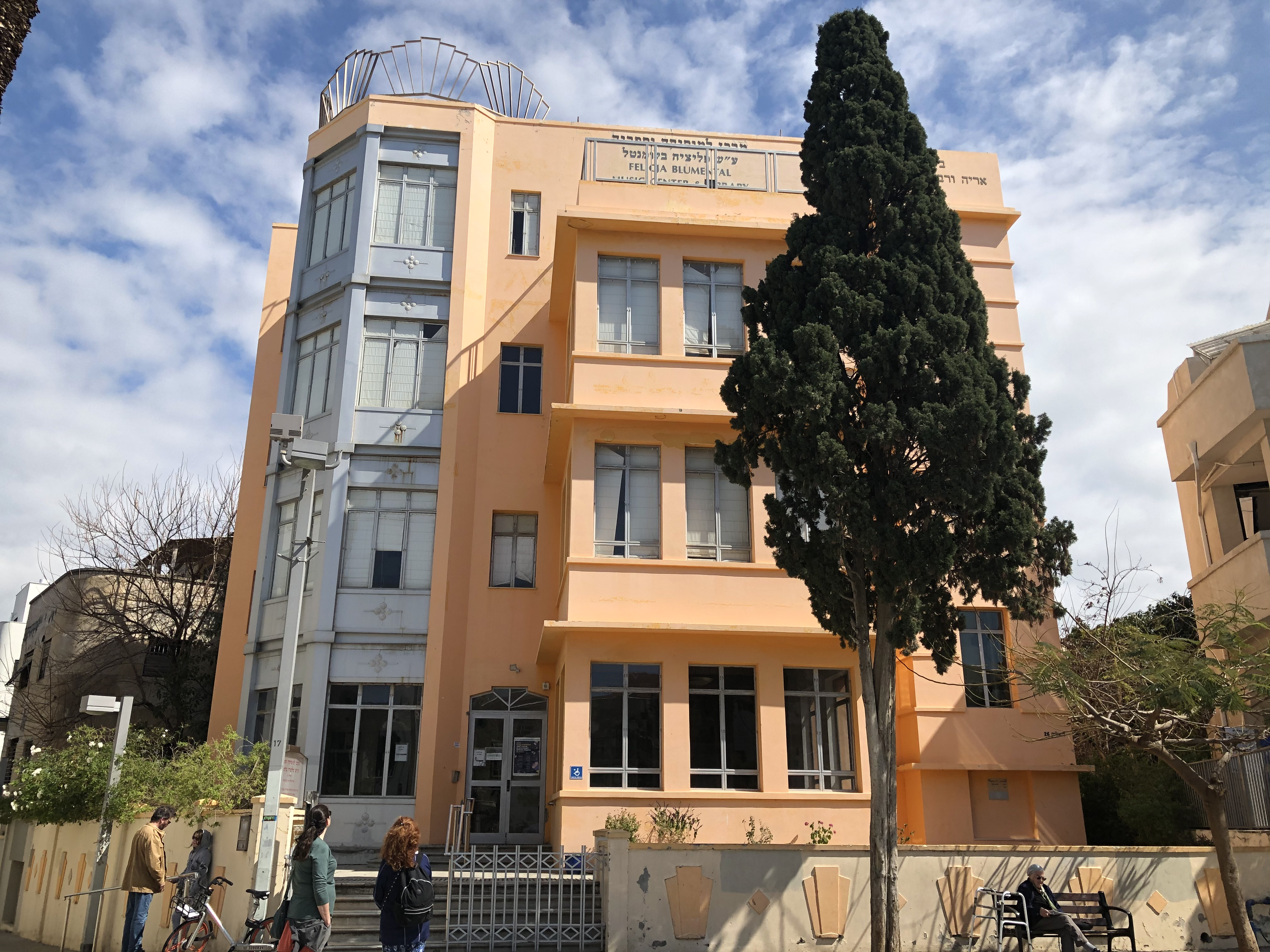

Yiddishpiel (combination of "Yiddish" and "spiel" - "play"), is a Yiddish theatre in Tel Aviv, Israel. The theatre was established in 1987.

The theatre was established with the support of former Tel Aviv mayor Shlomo Lahat, Chairman of Mercantile Discount Bank Moshe Noiderfer, and Shmuel Etsyon, who also served as its chairman and artistic director until November 2011, when he was replaced by Sasi Keshet.

Yiddishpiel's main goals are to commemorate and keep Yiddishkeit alive. The theater has a regular audience, most of which consists of relatively old people. The theater's offices are located on Carlebach Road 7, Tel Aviv.

In 1996, the Knesset approved a bill establishing a national authority for Yiddish and Ladino (Judeo-Spanish) culture, whose role is to create a strong base for the two languages and their cultures in Israel.

Since its establishment, the theater has performed 42 productions in front of large audiences in Israel and in other countries. Throughout the years, the theater has performed in Israeli festivals as well as important foreign festivals and has taken the stage in Wiesbaden, London, Frankfurt, Amsterdam, Vienna, Los Angeles, and Vilnius.

The theater has a wide selection of actors, including veterans such as Yaakov Bodo and Yaakov Alperon, and younger actors, who serve as the successors of Yiddish theater and culture, among them Dudu Fischer, Gadi Yagil, Anat Atzmon, Monica Vardimon, Jonathan Rozen, Yoni Eilat, and Amitai Kedar. Actor Carol Marcovicz also performed at Yiddishpiel until his death in 2006.

Repertory plays by a variety of playwrights are brought to the stage at the theater. Throughout every play, there are Hebrew and Russian subtitles, as well as audio, for the benefit of those who do not speak Yiddish.

In each theatrical season, Yiddishpiel presents four new plays, one per quarter. Some of the plays presented are by playwrights such as Shakespeare, Moliere, and others, translated into Yiddish; other plays are adapted into Yiddish (by Shalom Aleichem and others); and others are local plays (by Yehoshua Sobol and others).

== Prizes ==
- The "Entertainment Award of the Year" 2010 for the play "Sparkling Stars", chosen as the year's most entertaining play by members of the academy of the Israeli Theater Prize of 2010.
- "Comedy of the Year" 2001 for the play "Golden Youth" by Neil Simon, chosen as the year's best comedy by members of the academy of the Israeli Theater Prize of 2001.
- The "Theater Prize" of 1999, for the theater's work in promoting and enhancing Israeli theater, given by Shim'on Peres.
- "Keren Klor Prize" 1998, given to the theater at the president's residence Jubilee to the Independence of Israel party for bringing Yiddish theater into the lives of the Israeli audience and the elderly.
- "Itzik Manger Prize" 1997, given to the theater for their original plays in Yiddish.
