= Kiryat Tiv'on =

Kiryat Tiv'on קִרְיַת טִבְעוֹן كريات طبعون
- Local council (from 1958)

Hebrew transcription(s)
  - ISO 259: Qiryat Ṭibˁon
  - Also spelled: Qiryat Tiv'on (official)
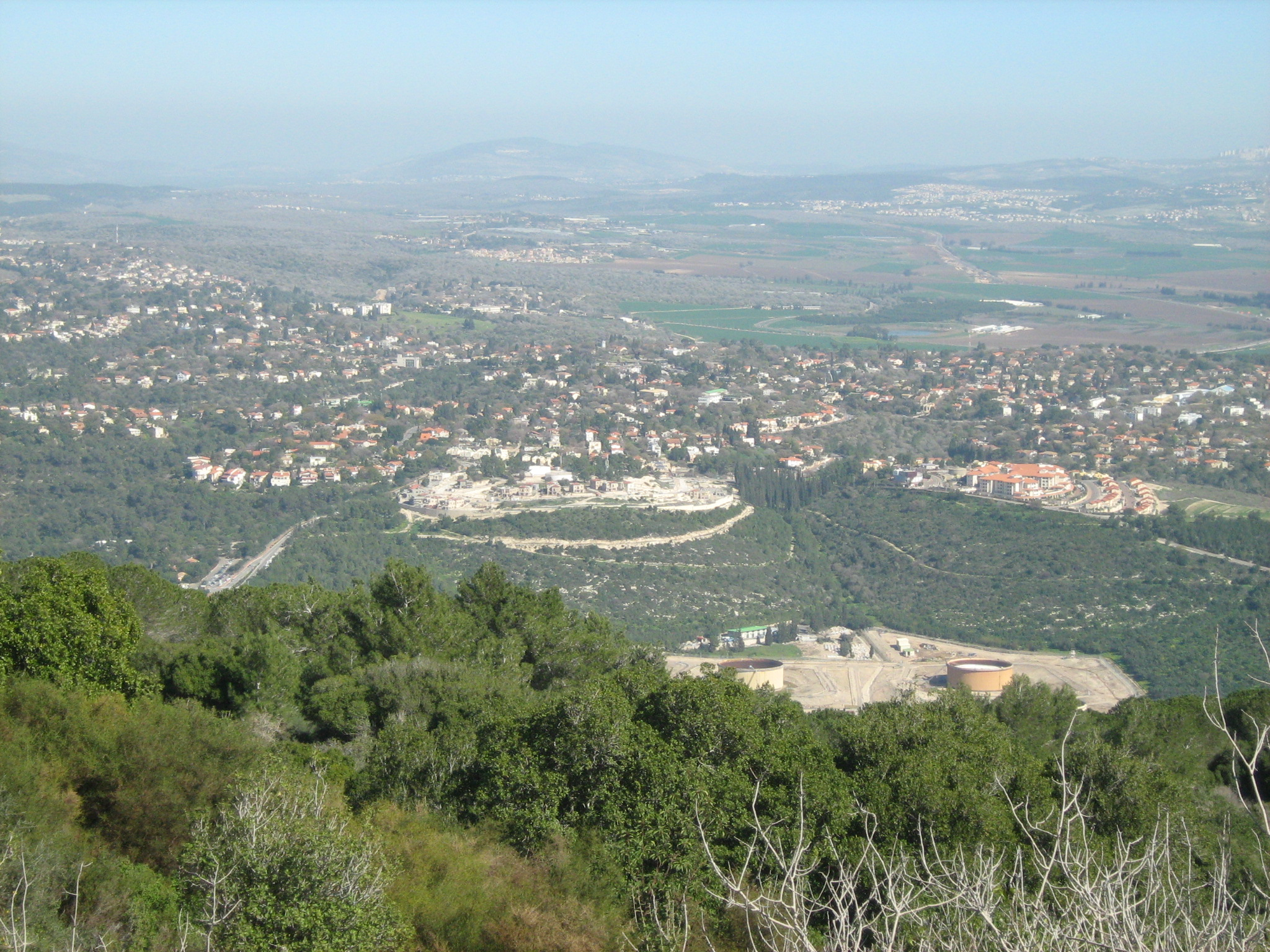
- View of Kiryat Tivon

- Location within Haifa region of Israel Location within Israel
- Coordinates: 32°43′26″N 35°7′38″E
- Country: Israel
- District: Haifa
- Subdistrict: Haifa

Government
  - Head of Municipality: Ido Greenblum

Area
  - Total: 8,419 dunams (8.419 km^{2}; 3.251 sq mi)

Population (2024)
  - Total: 19,158
  - Density: 2,276/km^{2} (5,894/sq mi)

Ethnicity
  - Jews and others: 99.3%
  - Arabs: 0.7%

Kiryat Tiv'on (Hebrew: קִרְיַת טִבְעוֹן, also Qiryat Tiv'on) is a town in the Haifa District of Israel, in the hills between the Zvulun (Zebulon) and Jezreel valleys. Kiryat Tiv'on is located 15 kilometres (9.3 mi) southeast of Haifa, on the main road to Nazareth. Kiryat Tiv'on is the result of the municipal merger of several older settlements, Tiv'on (est. 1946), Elro'i (est. 1935), Kiryat Haroshet (est. 1935) and Kiryat Amal (est. 1937). On the outskirts of Tiv'on is a Bedouin township called Basmat Tab'un. In 2022 Kiryat Tiv'on had a population of 19,130.

In the area of Kiryat Tivon, one can find the National Park and the World Heritage Site Beit She'arim, the Sanhedrin's Seat and the burial place of Rabbi Judah ha-Nasi, as well as the sculpture of Alexander Zaid, who resided in the area with his family and was murdered nearby.

== History ==
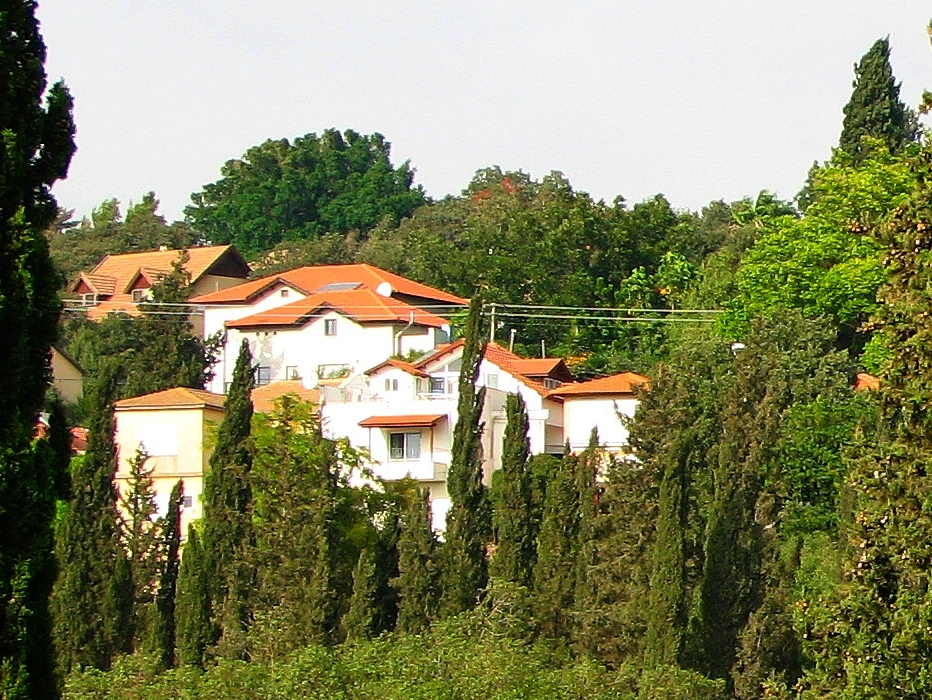
View of Kiryat Tivon from Beit She'arim National Park

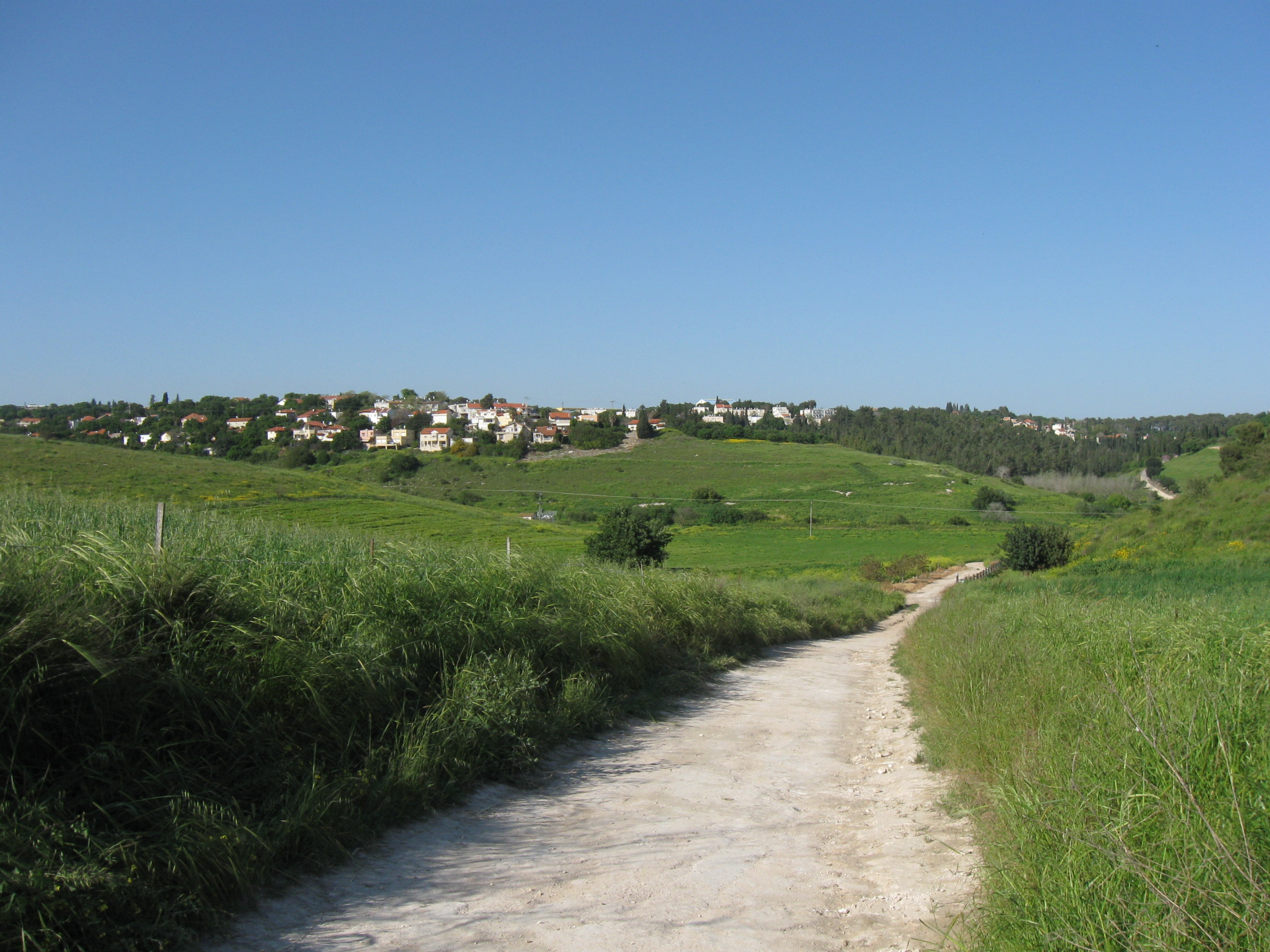
The southern houses of Tivon

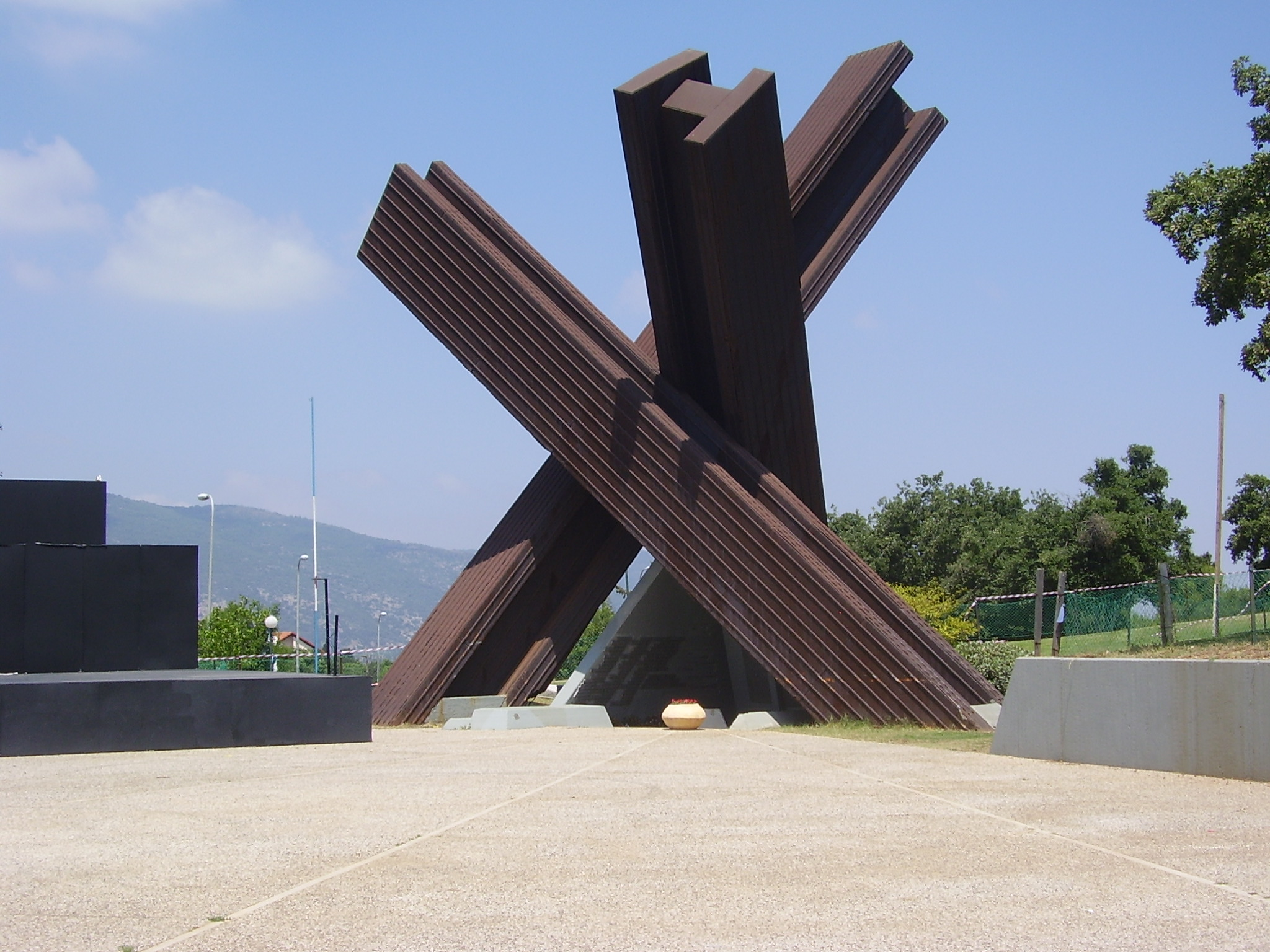
War Memorial in Kiryat Tivon - Yad Labanim

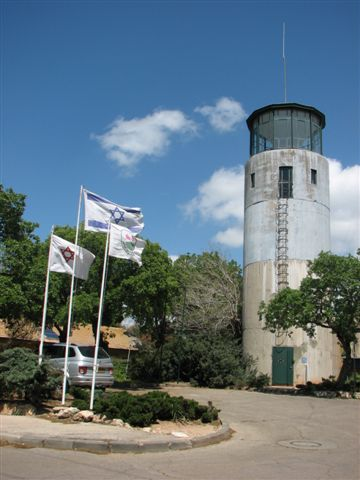
The water tower in Tivon

=== Ancient Israel ===
An ancient Jewish town called Tiv'on existed in the general area. It was mentioned in the Talmud and Mishnah. It is mentioned several times in Talmudic literature in connection with various sages, some of whom lived there.

=== Ottoman Empire ===
In 1859, the village of Tubaun was estimated to have a tillage of 22 feddans. In 1875, Victor Guérin found that the village had 200 inhabitants. In 1881, the PEF's Survey of Western Palestine (SWP) described Tubaun as a small adobe village, on high ground, at the edge of the wood. A population list from about 1887 showed that Tuba'un had about 90 inhabitants; all Muslims.

=== British Mandate ===
The 1922 census of Palestine showed that Tub'un had 151 inhabitants, all Muslim.

The area was acquired by the Jewish community as part of the Sursock Purchase. In 1925 a Zionist organisation purchased 30 feddans in Kiskis (present Alonim) and Tabaun (present Kiryat Tiv'on) from the Sursuk family of Beirut. At the time, there were 36 families living there. In the 1931 census Tabun had a population of 239, still all Muslim, in a total of 48 houses. From 1931 to 1935, a significant land controversy arose from competing claims by the Jewish Agency and Arab tenant farmers over the area, culminating in a violent clash between local Bedouins and Jewish watchmen in 1935.

In the 1945 statistics, al Tivon (Alonim) (previously Qusqus Taboun) had 370 Muslim and 320 Jewish inhabitants, with a total land area of 5,823 dunams. Of this, 141 dunams were used for plantations and irrigable land, 2,038 for cereals, while 3,644 dunams were classified as non-cultivable land.

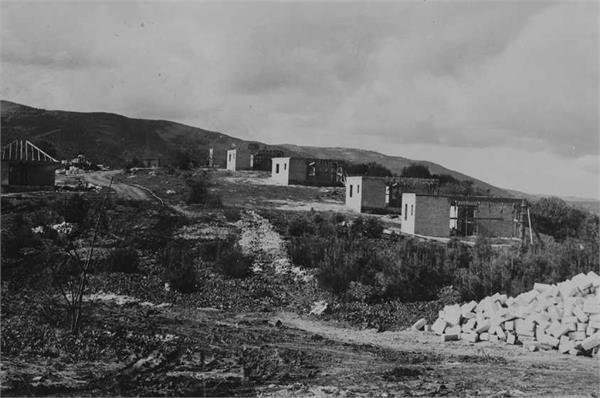
Kiryat Amal 1938

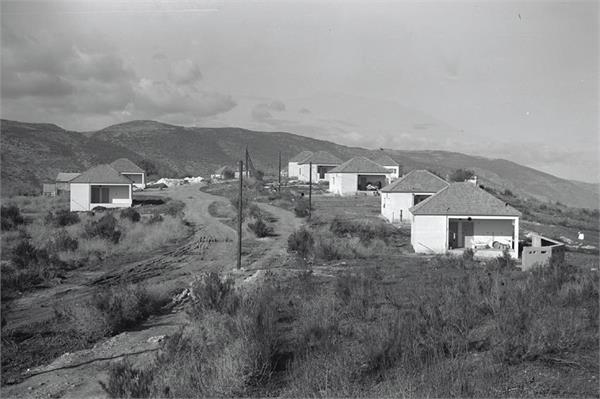
Kiryat Amal 1939

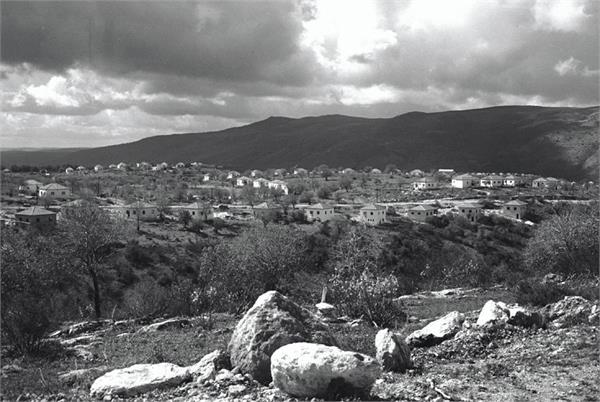
Tiv’on 1945

=== Modern Israel ===
Kiryat Tiv'on was established in 1958 merging three small villages Tiv'on (founded in 1947), Kiryat Amal (founded in 1937) and Elro'i (founded in 1935). Kiryat Haroshet, founded by a rabbi from Jablona, Poland who settled there with his followers in 1935, became part of Kiryat Tiv'on in 1979.

Tiv'on was built on land owned by a British Jewish couple who bought the land in early 1945. It was later developed by the Jewish National Fund based on an urban plan drawn up by Alexander Klein, a Russian Jewish architect who was commissioned by the Jewish National Fund.

The symbol of Kiryat Tiv'on is the cyclamen, a flower that grows between the rocks, reflecting the town's appreciation of nature and its efforts to preserve the landscape and safeguard the environment.

== Population ==
Historical population
Year	Pop.	±%
1972	10,200	—
1983	10,900	+6.9%
1995	12,500	+14.7%
2008	16,300	+30.4%
2022	17,944	+10.1%
2024	19,157	+6.8%

According to data from the Israel Central Bureau of Statistics (as of the end of September 2020, an estimate), there are 18,312 residents living in Kiryat Tivon. The population has been growing at an annual rate of 3%. The percentage of those eligible for a matriculation certificate among 12th-grade students in the academic year 2020-2021 was 84.1%. The average monthly salary of an employee in 2019 was 12,598 NIS (national average: 9,745 NIS).

== Characteristics of Kiryat Tivon ==
Kiryat Tivon is characterized by low-rise construction, tree groves, and extensive gardening. This style attracts strong population groups, so there is an inclination to preserve it while developing and constructing new neighborhoods. Additionally, there is a council decision not to establish industries or factories with air, water, or ground pollutants. The settlement was an early adopter of recycling back in the 1980s, at a time when most of Israel lacked infrastructure for waste disposal, waste separation, recycling facilities, and more. In every household in the settlement, there were two bins - one for regular waste and one for wet waste, collected on different days. However, research conducted by a local newspaper found that due to negligence, people did not separate the waste properly, and both bin contents were thrown into the garbage truck, effectively rendering the double bin system redundant.

=== Climate ===
The climate conditions in the area are considered comfortable. The annual average temperature difference is 19 Celsius degrees. The average temperature between day and night is 10 degrees Celsius. The average humidity is 65% - 70%. The number of sunny days per year ranges from 20 to 40 days, and heavy overcast days range from 3 to 6 days. The average annual rainfall is 700 millimeters.

=== Flora ===
In the hilly area within the boundaries of the settlement and its vicinity, grow remnants of the Quercus ithaburensis forest, Styrax officinalis, Pistacia atlantica, a Mediterranean forest, as well as a new intensive forest of Pine trees planted by the Jewish National Fund (AKA Keren Kayemet LeYisrael). Among the Tabor oak trees stands the ancient oak tree with a trunk circumference of 5.3 meters. Benches have been placed around it as a corner of remembrance for the soldier Ilan Gabbai, a paratrooper officer who died in the Second Lebanon War.

One-third of the settlement's area is covered with trees.

=== Livelihood Sources ===
Since Kiryat Tivon lacks industries, factories, and many institutions, most of the residents work outside of Tivon.

== Education ==
- Oranim Academic College, for educational studies.
- Ramat Hadassah youth village, founded by the Jewish Agency for Israel.
- Kfar Tikvah, village for disabled people.

== Landmarks ==
The town is best known for the national park, Beit She'arim, which borders it on the southwest. Beit Shearim was an important Jewish spiritual center and necropolis during the Roman period, and was once the seat of the Sanhedrin.

== Voting Patterns ==
In the 2022 election, 76 percent of voters in Kiryat Tiv'on voted for the parties of the center-left coalition led by Yair Lapid, while 20 percent voted for the parties of the right-wing coalition led by Benjamin Netanyahu and 1 percent voted for the Arab parties.

In the 2026 election, 78 percent of voters in Kiryat Tiv'on voted for the parties of the center-left coalition led by Gadi Eisenkot, while 16 percent voted for the parties of the right-wing coalition led by Benjamin Netanyahu and 1.3 percent voted for the Arab parties. An additional 2.8 percent voted for the Reservists, and 1.5 percent voted for Amcha Yisrael. Voter turnout increased 24 percent from the 2022 election.

== Notable people ==
- David Elazar, former Chief of Staff of the Israel Defense Forces
- Mordechai Gur, former Chief of Staff of the Israel Defense Forces
- Tal Friedman, actor and comedian
- Yoni Eilat, actor and singer
- Tomer Hemed, footballer
- Frank Lowy, Australian businessman and third richest man in Australia as of 2016
- Rina Mor, lawyer, Miss Israel 1976 and Miss Universe 1976
- Hilla Nachshon, TV host, model and actress.
- Sara Netanyahu, wife of Israeli prime minister Benjamin Netanyahu
- Eliezer Smoli, children's author
- Yaacov Ayish, Israeli Defense Attaché
- Ze'ev Razieli, Head of the Local Committee of Tivon 1949–1950

== Twin towns – sister cities ==
Kiryat Tiv'on is twinned with:

- Braunschweig, Germany
- Compiègne, France
- Čakovec, Croatia

== See also ==
- Alexander Zaid

== Bibliography ==
- Avneri, Arieh L. (1984). The Claim of Dispossession: Jewish Land-settlement and the Arabs, 1878-1948. Transaction Publishers. ISBN 0-87855-964-7.
- Barron, J.B., ed. (1923). Palestine: Report and General Abstracts of the Census of 1922. Government of Palestine.
- Conder, C.R.; Kitchener, H.H. (1881). The Survey of Western Palestine: Memoirs of the Topography, Orography, Hydrography, and Archaeology. Vol. 1. London: Committee of the Palestine Exploration Fund.
- Government of Palestine, Department of Statistics (1945). Village Statistics, April, 1945.
- Guérin, V. (1880). Description Géographique Historique et Archéologique de la Palestine (in French). Vol. 3: Galilee, pt. 1. Paris: L'Imprimerie Nationale.
- Hadawi, S. (1970). Village Statistics of 1945: A Classification of Land and Area ownership in Palestine. Palestine Liberation Organization Research Center.
- Palmer, E.H. (1881). The Survey of Western Palestine: Arabic and English Name Lists Collected During the Survey by Lieutenants Conder and Kitchener, R. E. Transliterated and Explained by E.H. Palmer. Committee of the Palestine Exploration Fund.
- Schumacher, G. (1888). "Population list of the Liwa of Akka". Quarterly Statement - Palestine Exploration Fund. 20: 169–191.
