= Yoni Eilat =

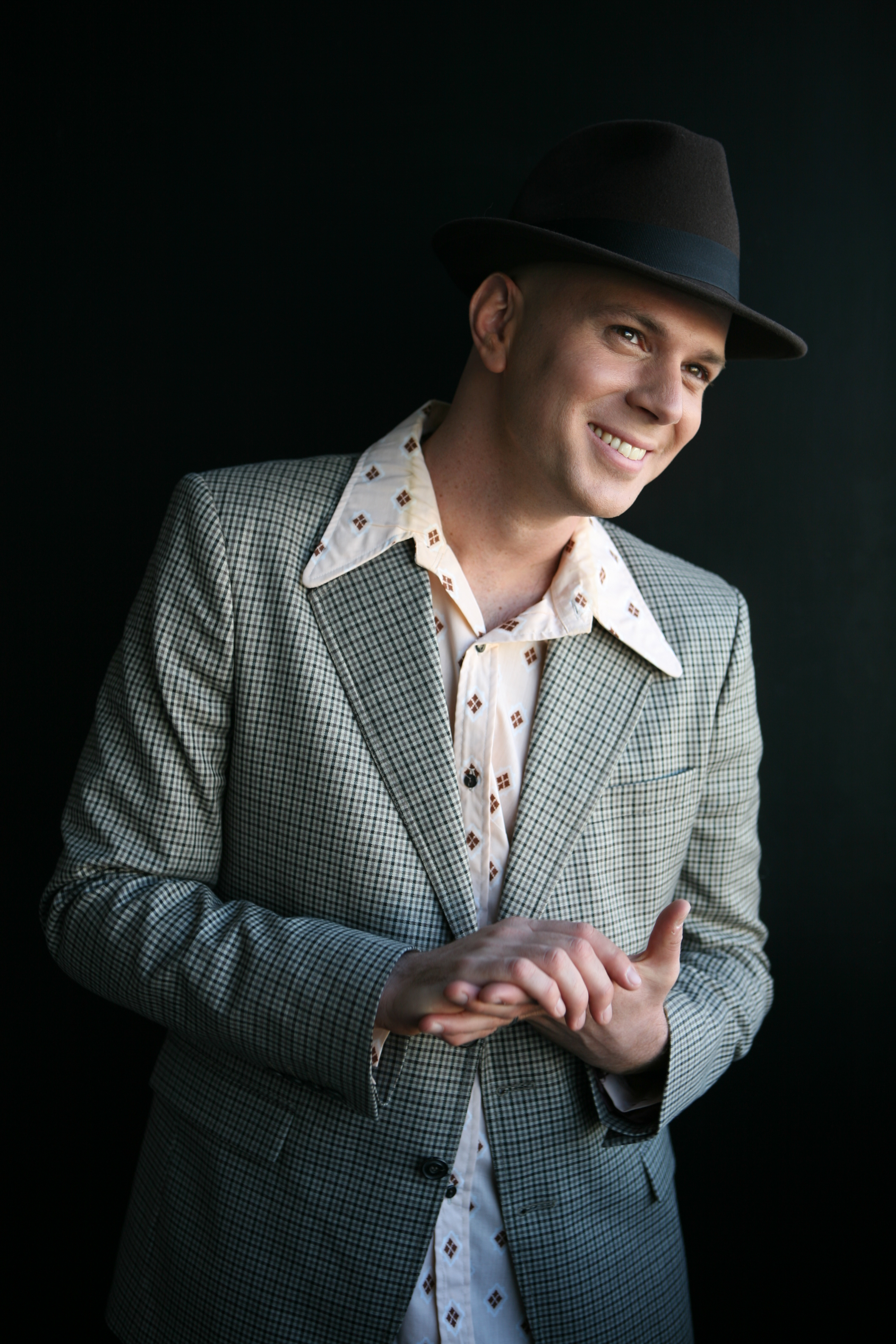
Yoni Eilat

Yoni Eilat (Hebrew: יוני אילת; November 5, 1975) is an Israeli actor and singer.

== Life and career ==
Eilat is a graduate of Beit Zvi, the Academy of Performing Arts in Israel. He has been performing since 2001 in different theater productions, children's plays and musicals. He is best known for his solo performances of Yiddish and Israeli songs ("shira betzibur"), which he performed throughout Israel and the world.

He is an ensemble member at Yiddishpiel Theater - the Israeli National Yiddish Theater. For his contribution to the Yiddish culture he is a winner of three Yiddishpiel Awards.

In 2010, Eilat released his first album, Zigayner Neshume (ציגיינער נשמה, Gypsy Soul): 11 Yiddish versions of Gypsy folk music. The songs were performed by Eilat as part of the 2011 International Jewish Music Festival in Amsterdam.

In 2012, he was in Poland when he participated in the joint Israeli-Polish production “Szpera 42” at the Chorea Theater.

In 2013 he directed and played in Yiddishpiel's production "The Kishke Monologues". The play, that described as a "musical-culinary journey" was based mainly on texts from cookbooks and included monologues in Hebrew and Yiddish songs. For his work Yoni was nominated as a director of the year at Israeli Theater award. In 2015 the show took part at the Kulturfest in NYC, and in 2016 at the Festival of Jewish Culture in Warsaw.

In 2015 he directed and played in another Yiddishpiel's production: "Zigayner Neshume", based on the songs from his album by that name.

In 2016 he directed "Will he return" - a play based on songs composed by Manos Hadjidakis, which was performed at The Goodman Acting School of the Negev.

In 2017, he directed and participated a third Yiddishpiel play: "A Yiddishe Mameh", a musical dealing with the image of the Jewish mother in theater, films and music.
