= Giv'ot Zaid =

Former kibbutz in northern Israel, established in 1943

Giv'ot Zaid: גבעות זייד (Hebrew)
- Kibbutz

Hebrew transcription(s)
  - Standard: Giv'ot Zaid
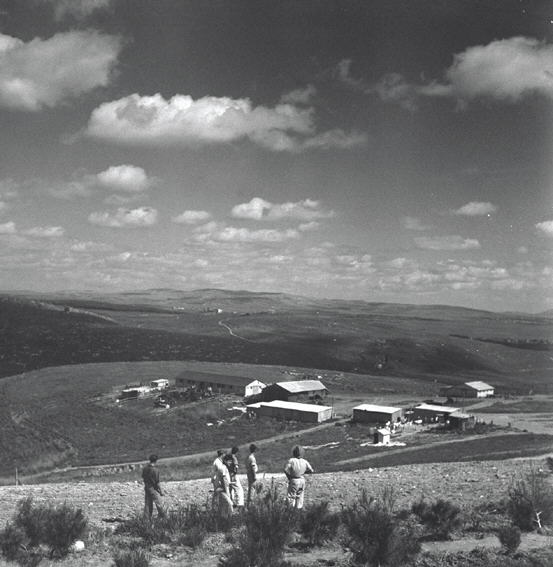
- Giv'ot Zaid in 1945
- Etymology: Hills of Zaid
- Location within Jezreel Valley region of Israel
- Coordinates: 32.7013°N 35.1150°E
- Country: Israel
- Founded: 1943
- Founder: Yerushalayimi gar'in, graduates of Mikveh Israel, immigrants from Poland and Romania
- Area: 2,300 dunams (2.3 km^{2}; 0.89 sq mi)

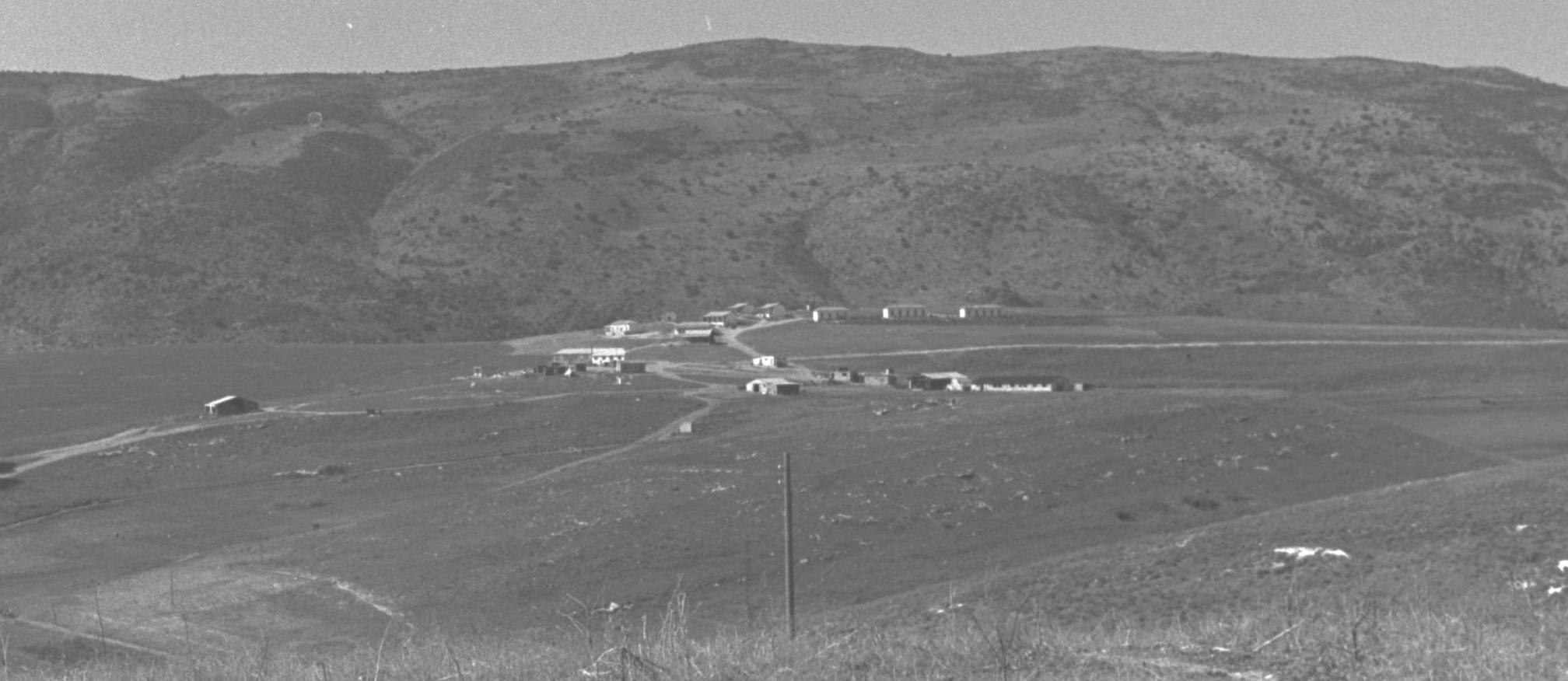
Giv’ot Zaid in 1946

Giv'ot Zaid (Hebrew: גבעות זייד, lit. 'Hills of Zaid') was a kibbutz in northern Israel.

== History ==
The kibbutz was established in 1943, to the north of the former home of Alexander Zaïd (from whom it took its name), who was murdered in 1938. The founders were made up of members of the Yerushalayimi gar'in organised by Yohanan Zaïd, graduates of Mikveh Israel organised by Yiftah Zaïd, and immigrants from Poland and Romania. By 1947 it had 135 members, with 2,300 dunams being cultivated.

In 1950 the kibbutz was dissolved due to disagreements between the residents. In 1951, some of them established the village of Beit Zaid on the site of Zaïd's residence. In 1960 a centre for adults with special needs, Kfar Tikvah was founded on the site of Givat Zaid.
