= Carmel Tunnels =

Highway in Israel

Coordinates: 32°47′24.06″N 35°0′18.52″E

Highway 23
- כביש 23
- Carmel Tunnels; Hebrew: מנהרות הכרמל, romanized: Minharot HaCarmel
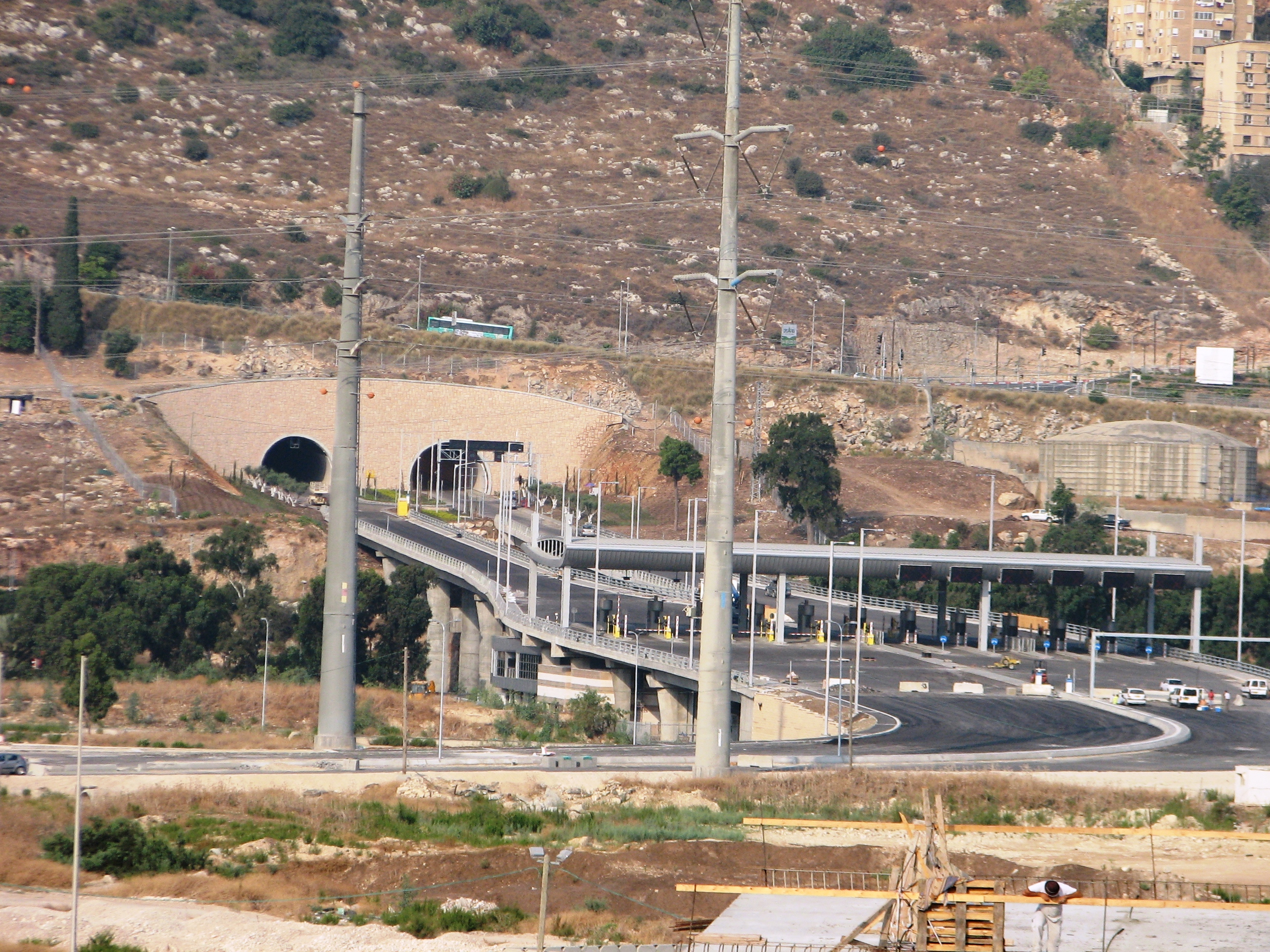
- Entrance to the tunnel at Check Post

Route information
- Length: 9.23 km (5.74 mi)
- Existed: December 2010–present

Major junctions
- West end: Haifa Darom Interchange
- Ruppin Interchange
- East end: Mevo Carmel Interchange

Location
- Country: Israel
- Major cities: Haifa; Neighborhoods: Hof HaCarmel, Neve Sha'anan, Check Post

Highway system
- Roads in Israel; Highways
← Highway 22	→ Highway 25

Highway 23, more-commonly known as the "Carmel Tunnels" (Hebrew: מנהרות הכרמל, Minharot HaCarmel), are a set of toll tunnels in Haifa, Israel. The tunnels' purpose is to reduce road congestion in the Haifa area and to provide an alternative route for reaching the eastern and central parts of the city, Haifa Bay and the Krayot area to and from Israel's central coastal plain without having to travel through traffic-congested downtown Haifa, having to drive up and across Mount Carmel, or bypassing Haifa from the east – along the edge of the Jezreel Valley (via Highway 70 for example). The tunnels cut the travel time from the Haifa South interchange in the west to the Checkpost interchange in the east from 30 to 50 minutes down to 6 minutes.

The tunnels were built and are operated as a BOT project. They were opened to traffic on 1 December 2010.

== Overview ==
The entire project is 8.6 km long. There are four tunnels (two sets of twin tunnels), the 3.5 km long western set and the 1.6 km long eastern set, containing two lanes of traffic in each tunnel. The tunnels were bored in Mount Carmel, essentially under the city of Haifa and have three portals: one from the west, near the MATAM business park (with a connection to the Coastal Highway and the Old Haifa–Tel Aviv Highway), one in the center off Ruppin Road (next to the Grand Canyon Shopping Mall), and from the east connecting to the Krayot (aka the "Checkpost") interchange and Highway 22 at the Yadin/Mevo Carmel interchange.

The project was built by Carmelton, a subsidiary of Ashtrom and Shikun UVinui, two of the largest infrastructure companies in Israel, and the tunnels were bored by China Civil Engineering Construction Corporation (CCECC), a Chinese company specializing in tunnel boring.

In January 2009, boring was completed on the westbound tunnel in the eastern portion of the project. Boring of the last tunnel was completed on June 1, 2009. The cost for drivers is 8.7 NIS for each segment (a drive to the central portal is considered one segment and driving the entire east–west route is composed of two segments). Payment can be made in cash at a toll booth or by video tolling using automatic number plate recognition for subscribers who arrange a billing relationship or by video or transponder tolling for Highway 6 subscribers. The project's total cost was estimated at 1.2 billion NIS (approx. US$300 million in 2008 dollars).

In early March 2014 construction was completed on a connector between the tunnels' eastern portal and Highway 22. This connector is the final link between a series of controlled-access highways that together form an inter-city highway corridor stretching along most of Israel's Mediterranean coast, from Acre (Akko) in the north to Ashdod in the south. This corridor consists of whole or parts of highways 22, 23, 2, 20 and 4.

== History ==
Plans for the tunnels were first proposed as early as 1992, and the winning tender for the construction of the tunnels was awarded to Carmelton in 1997. In 1999 Carmelton obtained financing for the project, but construction was delayed due to objections and other legal matters, at which point Israel Discount Bank backed out of its obligation to provide credit for the project. A lengthy legal suit followed, which eventually forced the bank to carry out its financial obligations.

Six hundred Chinese workers were brought in for the project by CCECC. The project was first delayed just one week after the cornerstone was laid in April 2007, following concerns over electromagnetic radiation standards. Work finally resumed on June 19, 2007.

The project was once again delayed in September 2008, when CCECC demanded that the contract with Carmelton be re-negotiated due to the increase in costs which CCECC had to deal with, mainly due to a rise in construction materials costs. Construction work was disrupted for over a month, slowing down and eventually stopping completely. Work was resumed on October 23, 2008.

Despite these delays, Carmelton opened the tunnels on December 1, 2010, six months ahead of schedule.

== Junctions and Interchanges ==
District	Location	km	mi	Name	Destinations	Notes
Haifa	Haifa	0.00	0.00	מחלף חיפה דרום (Haifa Darom Interchange)	Highway 2	
Haifa	Haifa	0.78	0.48	מחלף חיפה דרום (Haifa Darom Interchange)	Highway 4	
Haifa	Hof HaCarmel	1.51	0.94	שער אגרה (Toll Gate)		
Haifa	Hof HaCarmel	1.65	1.03	מנהרות הכרמל (Carmel Tunnels)		2 lanes, 3.2 km
Haifa	Neve Sha'anan	4.90	3.04	מחלף רופין (Ruppin Interchange)	Simcha Golan Road; Ruppin Road	named after Arthur Ruppin
Haifa	Neve Sha'anan	5.23	3.25	מנהרות הכרמל (Carmel Tunnels)		2 lanes, 1.65 km
Haifa	Haifa, Check Post	7.20	4.47	שער אגרה (Toll Gate)		
Haifa	Haifa, Check Post	7.33	4.55	מחלף הקריות (HaKrayot Interchange)	Highway 4 Route 752	
Haifa	Port of Haifa	9.23	5.74	מחלף מבוא כרמל (Mevo Carmel Interchange)	Highway 22; Yigael Yadin Road	
1.000 mi = 1.609 km; 1.000 km = 0.621 mi
