= Eliezer Smoli =

Israeli writer

- אליעזר שׂמֹאלי
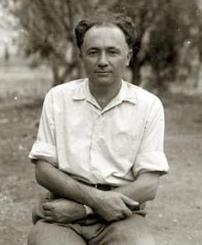
- Smoli as a teacher in Nesher, 1929
- Born: 1901; Volhynia, Russian Empire (now Ukraine)
- Died: 1985 (aged 83–84); Israel
- Occupation: Writer
- Writing career
- Language: Hebrew
- Genre: Children's literature
- Notable awards: Israel Prize (1957)
- Education: Berlin University

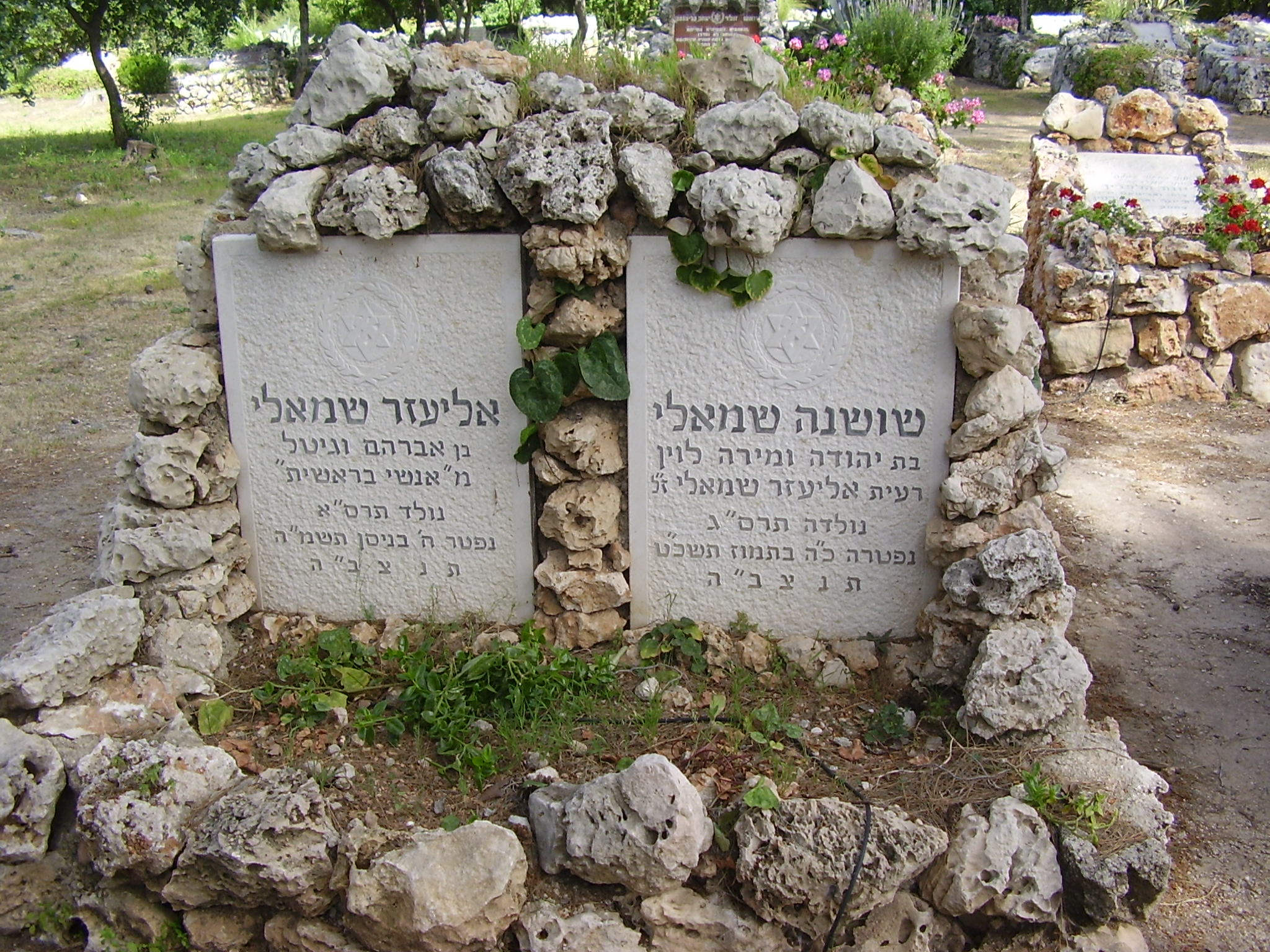
Graves of Eliezer Smoli and his wife Shoshana in Kiryat Tivon

Eliezer Smoli (Hebrew: אליעזר שׂמֹאלי; 1901–1985) was an Israeli writer known for his children's books.

== Biography ==
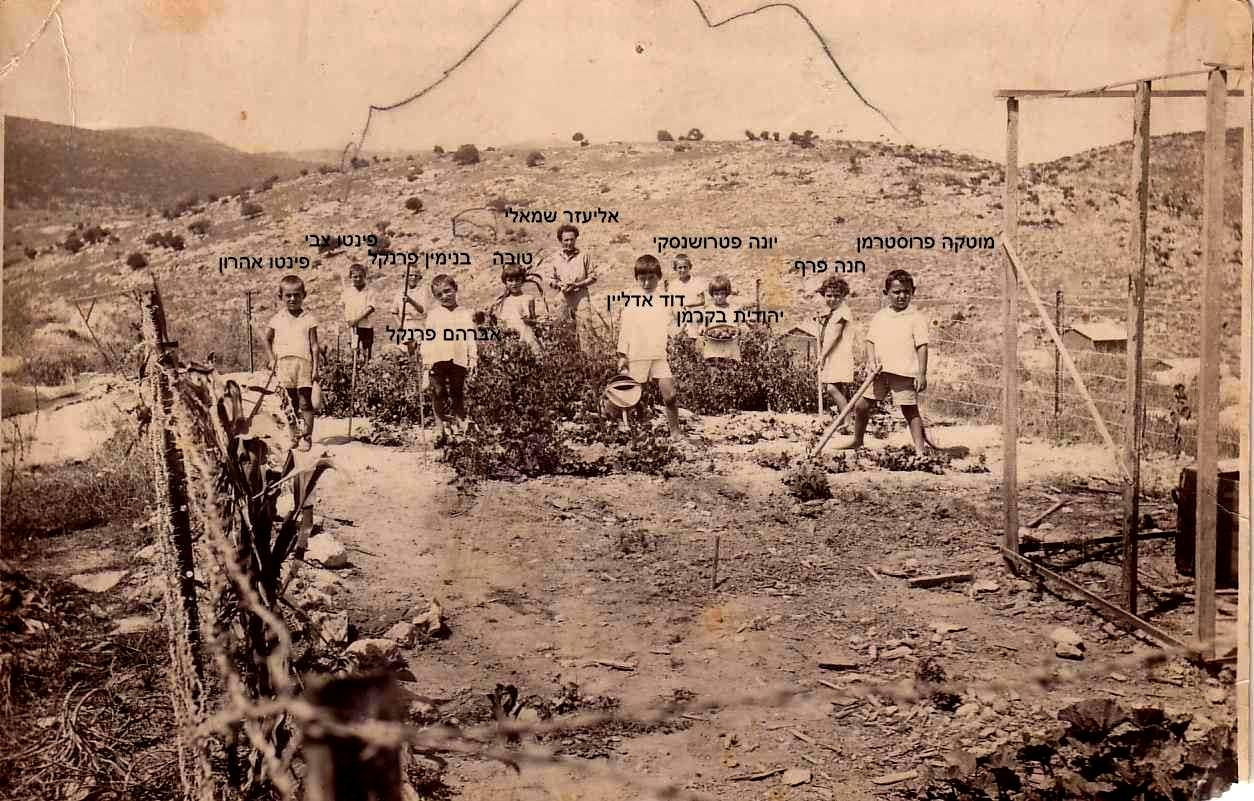
Smoli as a teacher in Nesher, 1929

Eliezer Smoli was born in the Volhynia region of western Ukraine (then in the Russian Empire). He began writing at the age of ten, After immigrating to British-ruled Palestine in 1920, he founded a labor movement school for workers' children in Nesher.

From 1936 to 1942, Smoli studied natural sciences at Berlin University.

== Awards and recognition ==
- In 1957, Smoli was awarded the Israel Prize for Children's literature.

== See also ==
- List of Israel Prize recipients
