= Malakhi Natural Region =

Coordinates: 31°43′44″N 34°44′46″E

- Natural Region
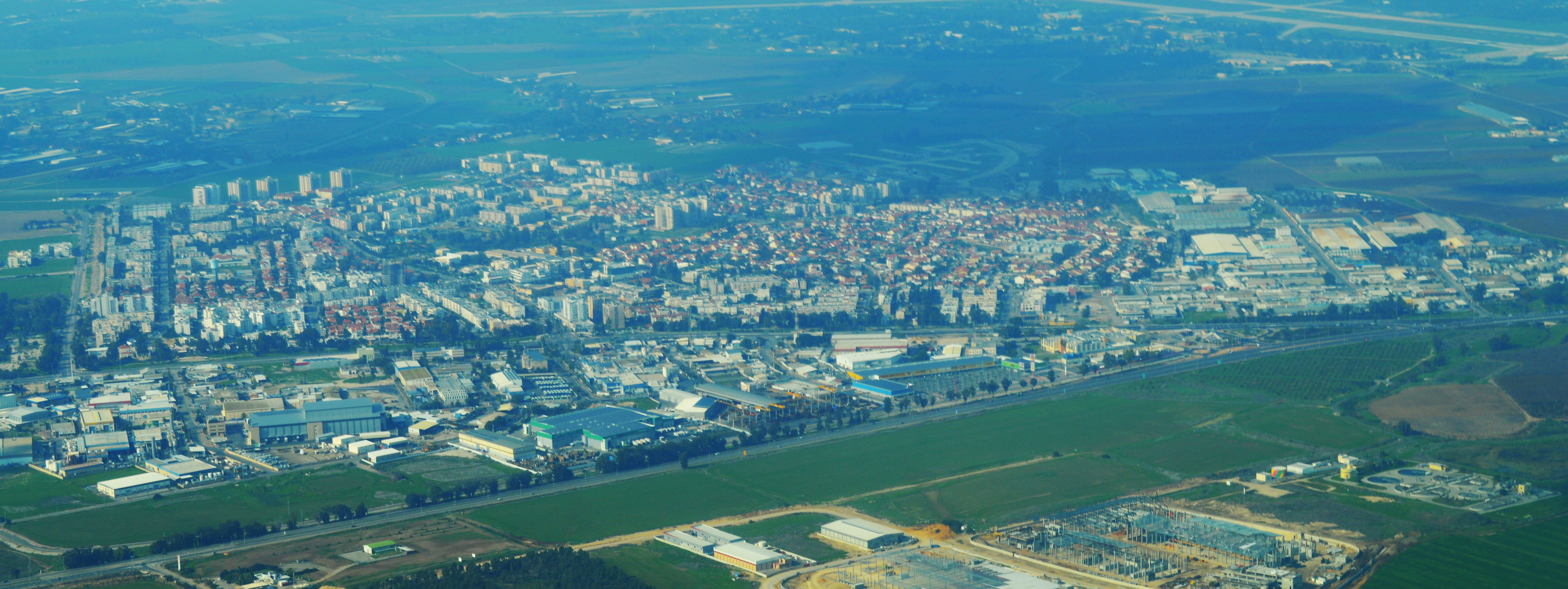
- View of Kiryat Malakhi
- Country: Israel
- District: Southern
- Subdistrict: Ashkelon
- Largest City: Kiryat Malakhi

Area
  - Total: 322 km^{2} (124 sq mi)

Population (2024)
  - Total: 71,300

Ethnicity
  - Jews and others: 94.0%
  - Arabs: 0.5%

The Malakhi Natural Region or Mal'akhi Natural Region is a natural region in the Ashkelon Subdistrict, in the Southern District of Israel. Kiryat Malakhi is the largest city in the natural region.

== Geography ==
Districts, Subdistricts and Natural Regions of the State of Israel, 2018

The natural region consists of a portion of south-central Israel, bounded by Ashdod and Ashkelon to the west, Gan Yavne and Gedera to the north, Beit Shemesh to the east, and Kiryat Gat to the south. It has an area of 322 km^{2}. The largest city in the natural region is Kiryat Malakhi, the natural region's namesake, which contains 39 percent of the natural region's population. There are no other localities in the natural region with more than 3,000 people. The natural region contains the Be'er Tuvia Regional Council along with portions of the Lakhish, Shafir, and Yoav regional councils.

== Demographics ==
The vast majority of the residents of the Lakhish Natural Region are Jewish. 0.5 percent of the residents are Arab, roughly half of whom live in the small village of al-'Azi.

Historical population
Year	Pop.	±%
1972	24,600	—
1983	28,200	+14.6%
1995	37,300	+32.3%
2008	51,360	+37.7%
2022	68,011	+32.4%
2024	71,300	+4.8%

== Administrative local authorities ==
Cities	Local Councils	Villages
Kiryat Malakhi	[None]	Be'er Tuvia: Ahva; Arugot; Avigdor; Azrikam; Be'er Tuvia; Beit Ezra; Bitzaron; Emunim; Ezer; Giv'ati; Hatzav; Hatzor; Kannot; Kfar Ahim; Kfar Warburg; Neve Mivtah; Nir Banim; Orot; Sde Uziyahu; Shtulim; Talmei Yehiel; Timorim; Yinon; Lakhish: Menuha; Shafir: Aluma; Ein Tzurim; Masuot Yitzhak; Merkaz Shapira; Komemiyut; Shafir; Zavdiel; Zrahia; Yoav: al-'Azi; Gal'on; Gat; Kedma; Kfar HaRif; Kfar Menahem; Nahala; Negba; Revadim; Sde Yoav; Sgula; Vardon

== Voting Patterns ==
In the 2022 election, 63 percent of voters in the natural region voted for the parties of the right-wing coalition led by Benjamin Netanyahu, while 34 percent voted for the parties of the center-left coalition led by Yair Lapid and 0.3 percent voted for the Arab parties.

In the 2026 election, 61 percent of voters in the natural region voted for the parties of the right-wing coalition led by Benjamin Netanyahu, while 33 percent voted for the parties of the center-left coalition led by Gadi Eisenkot and 0.4 percent voted for the Arab parties. An additional 3.3 percent voted for the Reservists, and 1.8 percent voted for Amcha Yisrael. Voter turnout increased 11 percent from the 2022 election.
