= Yasur, Gaza =

Yasur ياصور
- Etymology: personal name
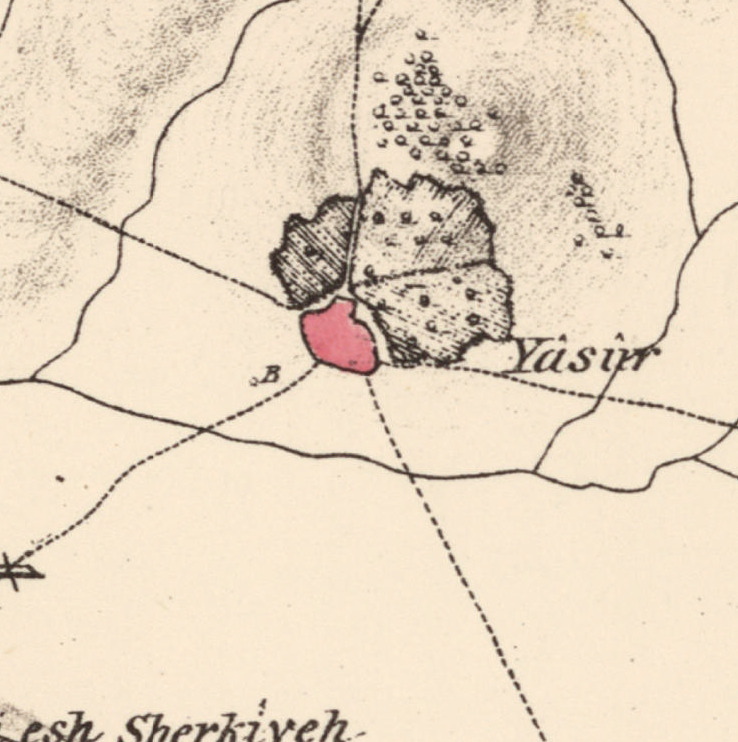
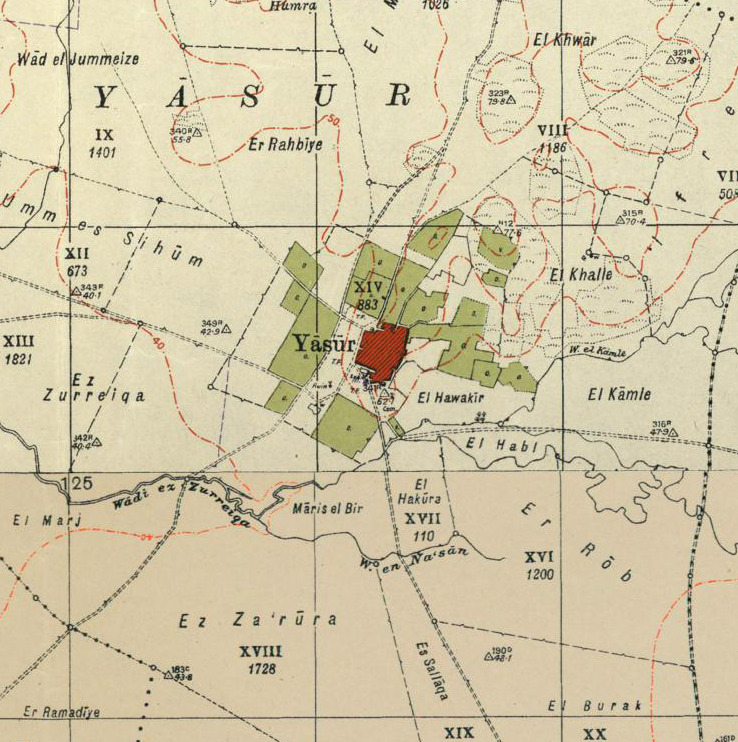
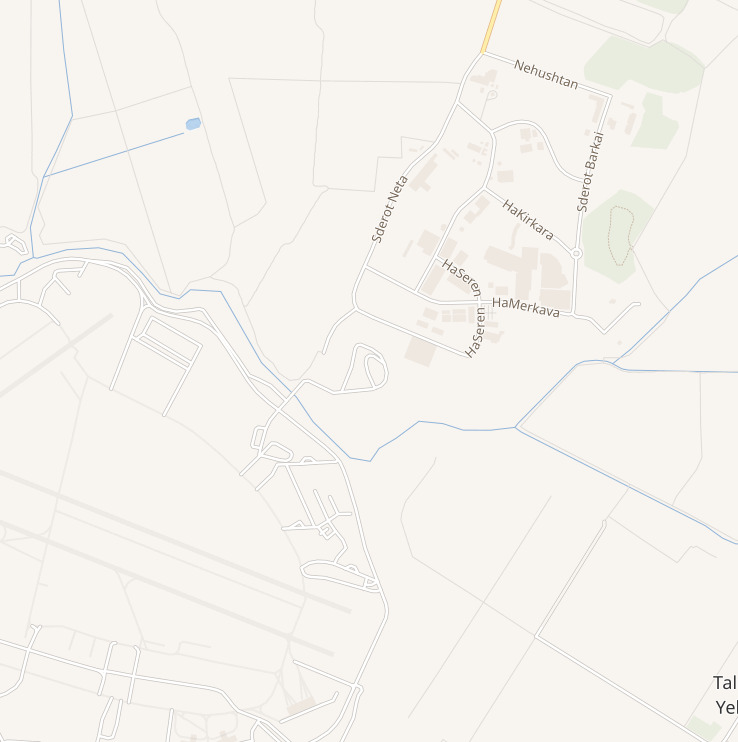
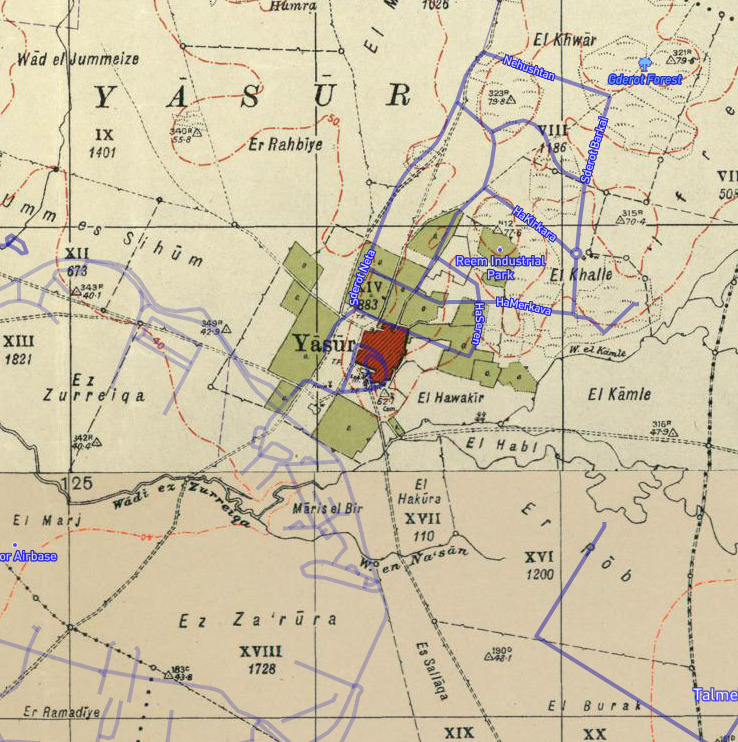
- 1870s map 1940s map modern map 1940s with modern overlay map A series of historical maps of the area around Yasur, Gaza (click the buttons)

- Location within Mandatory Palestine
- Coordinates: 31°45′56″N 34°44′53″E
- Palestine grid: 126/130
- Geopolitical entity: Mandatory Palestine
- Subdistrict: Gaza
- Date of depopulation: 11 June 1948

Area
  - Total: 16,390 dunams (16.39 km^{2}; 6.33 sq mi)

Population (1945)
  - Total: 1,070
- Cause(s) of depopulation: Military assault by Yishuv forces
- Current Localities: Talmei Yehiel, Bnei Ayish

Yasur (Arabic: ياصور) was a Palestinian village, located 40 kilometres northeast of Gaza, that was depopulated during the 1948 Arab–Israeli War. Its inhabitants fled a military assault by the First Battalion of Israel's Givati Brigade on 9 June 1948, part of Operation Barak.

The village consisted of an estimated 244 houses, an elementary school for boys, and a village mosque. Following the war the area was incorporated into the State of Israel and Talmei Yehiel and Bnei Ayish were established on the former lands of Yasur. The ruins of the built area of the village were demolished, and the site is today located in an industrial park between Bnei Ayish and the Hatzor Airbase.

== History ==
Ceramics from the Byzantine times have been found at Yasur.

During the Mamluk period (1205-1517), a mail station between Gaza and Damascus was located in Yasur, although this was later transferred to the village of Bayt Daras.

=== Ottoman era ===
It was incorporated into the Ottoman Empire in 1517 with the rest of Palestine, and in the 1596 tax records it was located in the nahiya (subdistrict) of Gaza part of Sanjak of Gaza, with 55 all Muslim households, an estimated population of 303. The villagers paid a fixed tax rate of 25% for the crops that they cultivated, which included wheat, barley, fruit, and sesame as well as on other types of property, such as goats, beehives and water buffaloes, a total of 16,000 akçe. All of the revenue went to a Muslim charitable institution.

The American scholar Edward Robinson travelled through Palestine in 1838, and noted Yasur, as a Muslim village, located in the Gaza district.

James Turner Barclay mentions passing Yasur, Bayt Dajan and al-Sarafand, on his travels between Jaffa and Haifa in The City of the Great King: Or, Jerusalem as it Was, as it Is, and as it is, 1858.

In 1863, French explorer Victor Guérin found the village situated on a hill and containing 450 villagers. The houses were built with sun baked bricks, and surrounded by tobacco plantations and olives. The only ancient remains he saw was a column of mutilated, gray-white marble near a well. An Ottoman village list from about 1870 found that Jasur had a population of 103, in 72 houses, though the population count included men, only.

In 1882 the PEF's Survey of Western Palestine described Yasur as an "ordinary adobe village"". It had a well to the south and large gardens to the north and east.

Yasur was also mentioned in The Life and Letters of Thomas Hodgkin (1918).

=== British Mandate era ===
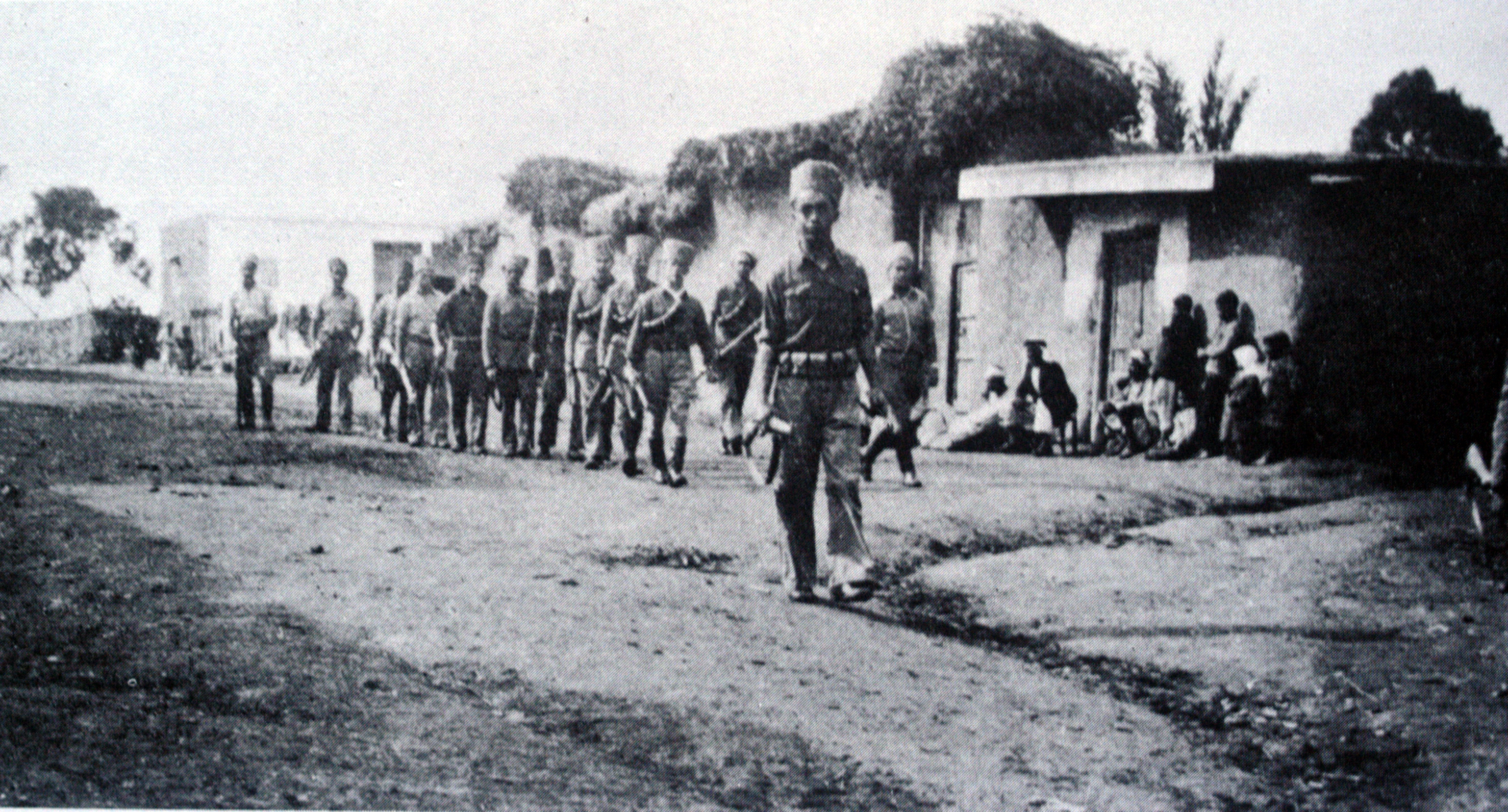
A FOSH unit passes through Yasur, 1938–39

In the 1922 census of Palestine conducted by the British Mandate authorities, Yasur had a population of 456 inhabitants, all Muslims. In the 1931 census, Yasur had 129 occupied houses and a population of 648 Muslims, 5 Christians and 1 Jew.

In the 1945 statistics the population of Yasur consisted of 1,070 Muslims and the total land area was 16,390 dunams, according to an official land and population survey. Of this, Arabs used 636 dunams for citrus and bananas, 180 for plantations and irrigable land, 12,173 for cereals, while 35 dunams were built-up areas.

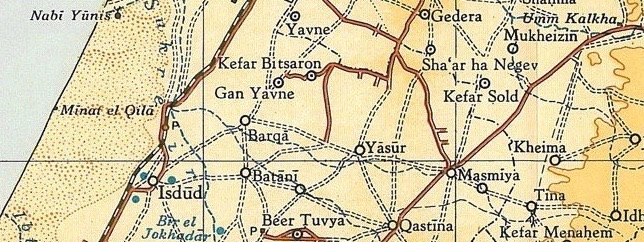
Yasur, Gaza District,1945, 1:250,000

=== 1948 and after ===
In early 1949 it was reported that many of the residents of Yazur were living in tents in what became Maghazi refugee camp in the Gaza Strip.

According to Walid Khalidi, 1992:

"The village is a closed, fenced-in military zone. At the village entrance there is a sign: 'TAT Aircraft Parts Industrial Firm.' A single undemolished house stands some 10 m away from the entrance. Next to it is a demolished one and a number of cactuses. A dirt road, lined by cactuses and olive and almond trees, passes by the southern boundary of the fence. The area inside and outside the fence has also been planted with eucalyptus trees"

== See also ==
- Yas'ur
- Depopulated Palestinian locations in Israel

== Bibliography ==
- Barclay, J. T. (1858). The City of the Great King: Or, Jerusalem as it Was, as it Is, and as it is. Philadelphia: J. Challen and sons.
- Barron, J. B., ed. (1923). Palestine: Report and General Abstracts of the Census of 1922. Government of Palestine.
- Conder, C.R.; Kitchener, H. H. (1882). The Survey of Western Palestine: Memoirs of the Topography, Orography, Hydrography, and Archaeology. Vol. 2. London: Committee of the Palestine Exploration Fund.
- Dauphin, C. (1998). La Palestine byzantine, Peuplement et Populations. BAR International Series 726 (in French). Vol. III : Catalogue. Oxford: Archeopress. ISBN 0-860549-05-4.
- Department of Statistics (1945). Village Statistics, April, 1945. Government of Palestine.
- Guérin, V. (1869). Description Géographique Historique et Archéologique de la Palestine (in French). Vol. 1: Judee, pt. 2. Paris: L'Imprimerie Nationale.
- Hadawi, S. (1970). Village Statistics of 1945: A Classification of Land and Area ownership in Palestine. Palestine Liberation Organization Research Center.
- Hartmann, M. (1883). "Die Ortschaftenliste des Liwa Jerusalem in dem türkischen Staatskalender für Syrien auf das Jahr 1288 der Flucht (1871)". Zeitschrift des Deutschen Palästina-Vereins. 6: 102–149.
- Hull, E (1886). The Survey of Western Palestine: Memoir on the Physical Geology and Geography of Arabia Petraea. Committee of the Palestine Exploration Fund. ( p. 64)
- Hütteroth, W.-D.; Abdulfattah, K. (1977). Historical Geography of Palestine, Transjordan and Southern Syria in the Late 16th Century. Erlanger Geographische Arbeiten, Sonderband 5. Erlangen, Germany: Vorstand der Fränkischen Geographischen Gesellschaft. ISBN 3-920405-41-2.
- Khalidi, W. (1992). All That Remains: The Palestinian Villages Occupied and Depopulated by Israel in 1948. Washington D.C.: Institute for Palestine Studies. ISBN 0-88728-224-5.
- Mills, E., ed. (1932). Census of Palestine 1931. Population of Villages, Towns and Administrative Areas. Jerusalem: Government of Palestine.
- Morris, B. (2004). The Birth of the Palestinian Refugee Problem Revisited. Cambridge University Press. ISBN 978-0-521-00967-6. (pp. 179, 260)
- Palmer, E. H. (1881). The Survey of Western Palestine: Arabic and English Name Lists Collected During the Survey by Lieutenants Conder and Kitchener, R. E. Transliterated and Explained by E.H. Palmer. Committee of the Palestine Exploration Fund.
- Robinson, E.; Smith, E. (1841). Biblical Researches in Palestine, Mount Sinai and Arabia Petraea: A Journal of Travels in the year 1838. Vol. 2. Boston: Crocker & Brewster.
- Robinson, E.; Smith, E. (1841). Biblical Researches in Palestine, Mount Sinai and Arabia Petraea: A Journal of Travels in the year 1838. Vol. 3. Boston: Crocker & Brewster.
- Socin, A. (1879). "Alphabetisches Verzeichniss von Ortschaften des Paschalik Jerusalem". Zeitschrift des Deutschen Palästina-Vereins. 2: 135–163.
