= Neve Mivtah =

Moshav in southern Israel

Neve Mivtah: נווה מבטח (Hebrew); نفي مفتاح (Arabic)
- Location within Ashkelon region of Israel
- Coordinates: 31°48′19″N 34°44′28″E
- Country: Israel
- District: Southern
- Subdistrict: Ashkelon
- Council: Be'er Tuvia
- Affiliation: Moshavim Movement
- Founded: 1950
- Founder: Polish Jewish immigrants
- Population (2024): 775

Neve Mivtah (Hebrew: נְוֵה מִבְטַח, lit. Oasis of Confidence) is a small moshav in southern Israel. Located near Bnei Ayish and Gedera, it falls under the jurisdiction of Be'er Tuvia Regional Council. In 2024 it had a population of 775.

== Etymology ==
The moshav is surrounded by military bases, such as Hatzor Airbase and Tel Nof Airbase. Because of this, a feeling of security and confidence was over the founders, and the moshav was given its name meaning "Oasis of Confidence". The inspiration for the name came from the Book of Psalms:
" 'O God of our salvation; the confidence (=mivtah) of all the ends of the earth' (Psalms 65:6)"

== History ==
The moshav was founded in 1950, on the land of the depopulated Palestinian village Bashit, and nowadays is inhabited by about 120 families. At first it was a temporary ma'abara to sixty immigrant families of Jewish Holocaust survivors from Poland, serving as an expansion to the older moshav Bitzaron. Its residents were housed in tin dwellings, supplied by the Jewish Agency for Israel. Since it was not an independent moshav, the future residents had to redeem the food coupons, supplied by the Agency, at Bitzaron centre. The residents of Bitzaron were given favour as to the food supply, and thus many times had the inhabitants of the ma'abara to return empty-handed. They have decided to cut themselves off from Bitzaron, and on 1950, only a short while after placing the ma'abara, Neve Mivtah was founded.
