= Tal Al-Farani =

الفراني (Farani) تل الفراني (Tal Al-Farani) تل بوران ،بالعبريةתל פורן
- تل (Tal)
- Country: Israel
- Region: Southern Region
- Elevation: 38 m (125 ft)
- Time zone: UTC+2 (Eastern European Time)
  - Summer (DST): UTC+3 (Eastern European Summer Time)

Tal Al-Farani (Arabic: تل الفراني), a place mentioned in the Torah located in Israel, about 3.5 km to the east of the Mediterranean Sea, between Ashdod and Ashkelon, and an area of about 10 hectares, was inhabited and populated during the first three stages of the ancient Bronze Age and only during the third phase of Ancient Bronze Age.

Tal Al-Farani is considered one of the archaeological sites in the town of Hamama, where this landmark is an archeological hill where the remains of a population from the Canaanite era until the Byzantine era. The excavations revealed Canaanite fortifications on this hill. The Farani Hill is located in the north-east of Hamama, Al-Abtah to the west directly from the railway line between Lod and Gaza, and this hill is located in the property of the Farani family (Hamamiya).
