= Be'er Tuvia Regional Council =

Coordinates: 31°46′N 34°43′E

Be'er Tuvia Regional Council מועצה אזורית באר טוביה مجلس إقليمي بئر طوفيا
- Regional council
- Seal
- Interactive map of Be'er Tuvia Regional Council
- Country: Israel
- District: Southern
- Subdistrict: Ashkelon
- Natural region: Malakhi
- Founded: 1896
- Incorporated: 1950

Government
  - Head of Council: Ben Cohen

Area
  - Total: 127,560 dunams (127.56 km^{2}; 49.25 sq mi)

Population (2025)
  - Total: 24,966
  - Density: 195.72/km^{2} (506.91/sq mi)
- Time zone: UTC+2 (IST)
  - Summer (DST): UTC+3 (IDT)
- Website: www.beer-tuvia.org.il

Be'er Tuvia Regional Council (Hebrew: מועצה אזורית באר טוביה, Mo'atza Azorit Be'er Tovia) is a regional council in the Southern District of Israel.

It borders Yoav and Nahal Sorek regional councils in the east; Hof Ashkelon regional council, the Mediterranean Sea, the city of Ashdod and Gan Yavne local council in the west; Gederot, Hevel Yavne regional councils and Gedera, Bnei Aish local councils in the north; Shafir regional council in the south. The town of Kiryat Malakhi is enclaved in the middle.

Be'er Tuvia was incorporated as a regional council in 1950, with a land-area of approximately 140,000 dunams (140 km^{2}). According to the Israel Central Bureau of Statistics, the regional council had a population of 24,873 in 2024.

== Economy ==
Initially all settlements in the area were built as agricultural. There are lot of plantations and crop fields can be seen. Farms producing beef and milk are also developed. The Buffalo Ranch in Bitzaron is very famous.

Yet, over the years the local government developed industry on the lands that belongs to the regional council.

Today there are four industry zones:

- Kannot industry zone - located on junction between Highway 40 and Highway 41. It became an important logistic center and site of several function halls.
- Be'er Tuvia industry zone - located near Kiryat Malakhi on junction between Highway 3 and Highway 40. It contains numerous factories and workshops.
- Ad Halom industry zone - located on Highway 4 south of Ashdod. Some of its factories cause air pollution in Ashdod. The municipality of Ashdod wants to take control over the zone, since it stands near Tel Ashdod - location of an ancient Philistine city of Ashdod.
- Mivza - Re'em industrial zone - a small industry area south of Bnei Aish.

Hatzor Airbase of the Israeli Air Force is located in the council's territory.

== List of settlements ==
There are 23 communities including nineteen moshavim, one kibbutz, one community settlement, a youth village and a service centre.

- Ahva
- Arugot
- Avigdor
- Azrikam
- Be'er Tuvia
- Beit Ezra
- Bitzaron
- Ezer
- Emunim
- Giv'ati
- Hatzav
- Hatzor
- Kannot
- Kfar Ahim
- Kfar Warburg
- Neve Mivtah (1950)
- Nir Banim
- Orot
- Sde Uziyahu
- Shtulim
- Talmei Yehiel
- Timorim
- Yinon
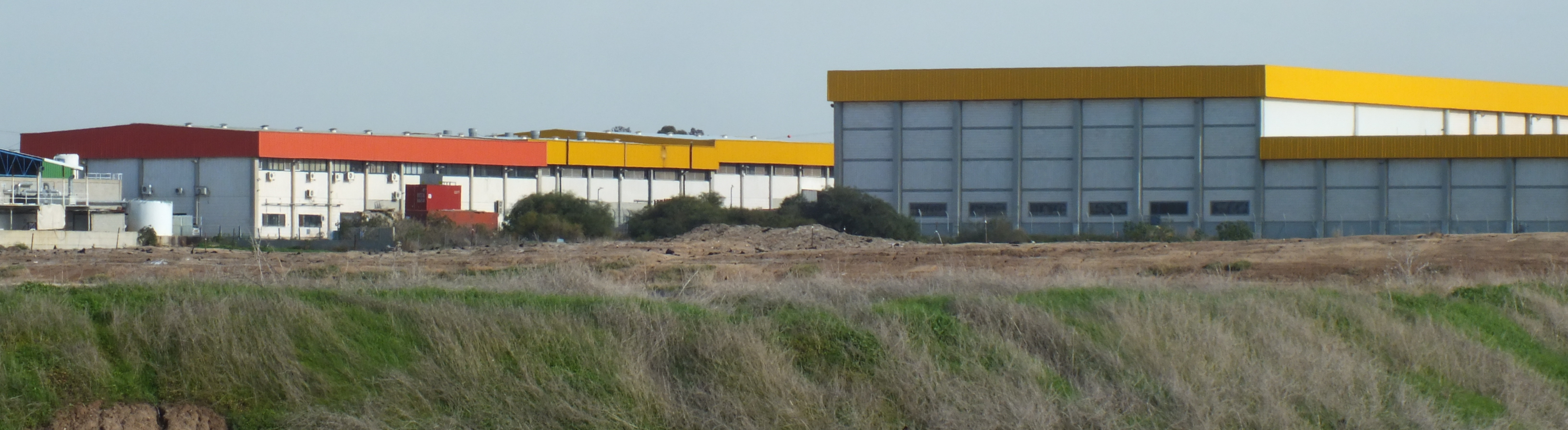
Be'er Tuvia industry zone in Kiryat Mal'achi

== Demographics ==
Historical population
Year	Pop.	±%
1972	9,600	—
1983	9,600	+0.0%
1995	11,600	+20.8%
2008	18,950	+63.4%
2022	24,412	+28.8%
2024	24,873	+1.9%

== Voting patterns ==
In the 2022 election, 53 percent of voters in the regional council voted for the parties of the center-left coalition led by Yair Lapid, while 47 percent voted for the parties of the right-wing coalition led by Benjamin Netanyahu and 0.6 percent voted for the Arab parties.

In the 2026 election, 52 percent of voters in the regional council voted for the parties of the center-left coalition led by Gadi Eisenkot, while 42 percent voted for the parties of the right-wing coalition led by Benjamin Netanyahu and 0.2 percent voted for the Arab parties. An additional 3.9 percent voted for the Reservists, and 1.7 percent voted for Amcha Yisrael. Voter turnout increased 5 percent from the 2022 election.
