= Emunim =

Moshav in southern Israel

Emunim: אֱמוּנִים (Hebrew); إمونيم (Arabic)
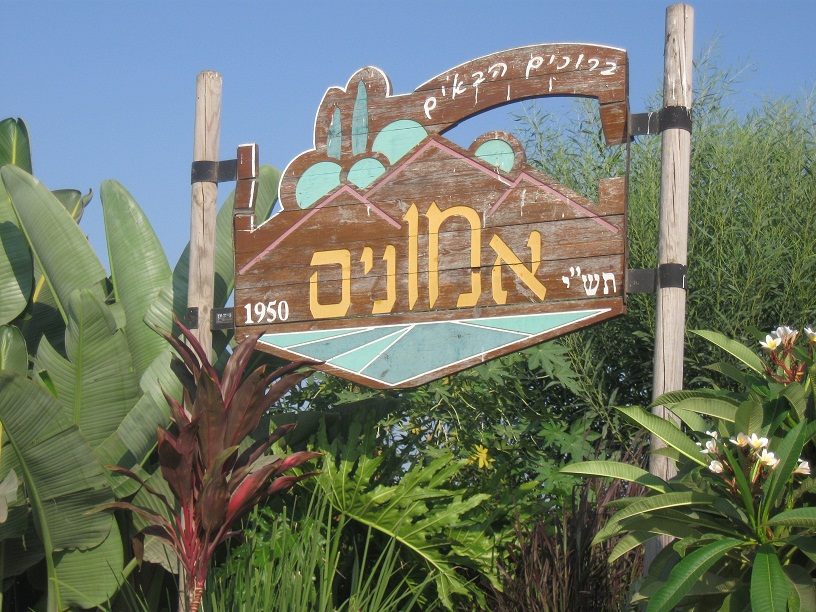
- Sign at the entrance to the Moshav

- Location within Ashkelon region of Israel Location within Israel
- Coordinates: 31°44′37″N 34°40′32″E
- Country: Israel
- District: Southern
- Subdistrict: Ashkelon
- Council: Be'er Tuvia
- Affiliation: Moshavim Movement
- Founded: 1950
- Founder: Egyptian Jewish immigrants and refugees
- Population (2024): 1,075

Emunim (Hebrew: אֱמוּנִים, lit. the faithful) is a moshav in central Israel. Located near Ashdod, it falls under the jurisdiction of Be'er Tuvia Regional Council. In 2024 it had a population of 1,075.

== History ==
The moshav was founded in 1950 by Jewish immigrants and refugees from Egypt, on the lands of the former depopulated Palestinian town of Bayt Daras. The main source of income for the residents was animal and arable farming.

Like many of the other moshavim in the area, its name is symbolic and taken from the Tanakh, Psalm 31:23: "the Lord preserves the faithful".
