= Azrikam =

Moshav in southern Israel

Azrikam: עַזְרִיקָם (Hebrew); عزريكام (Arabic)
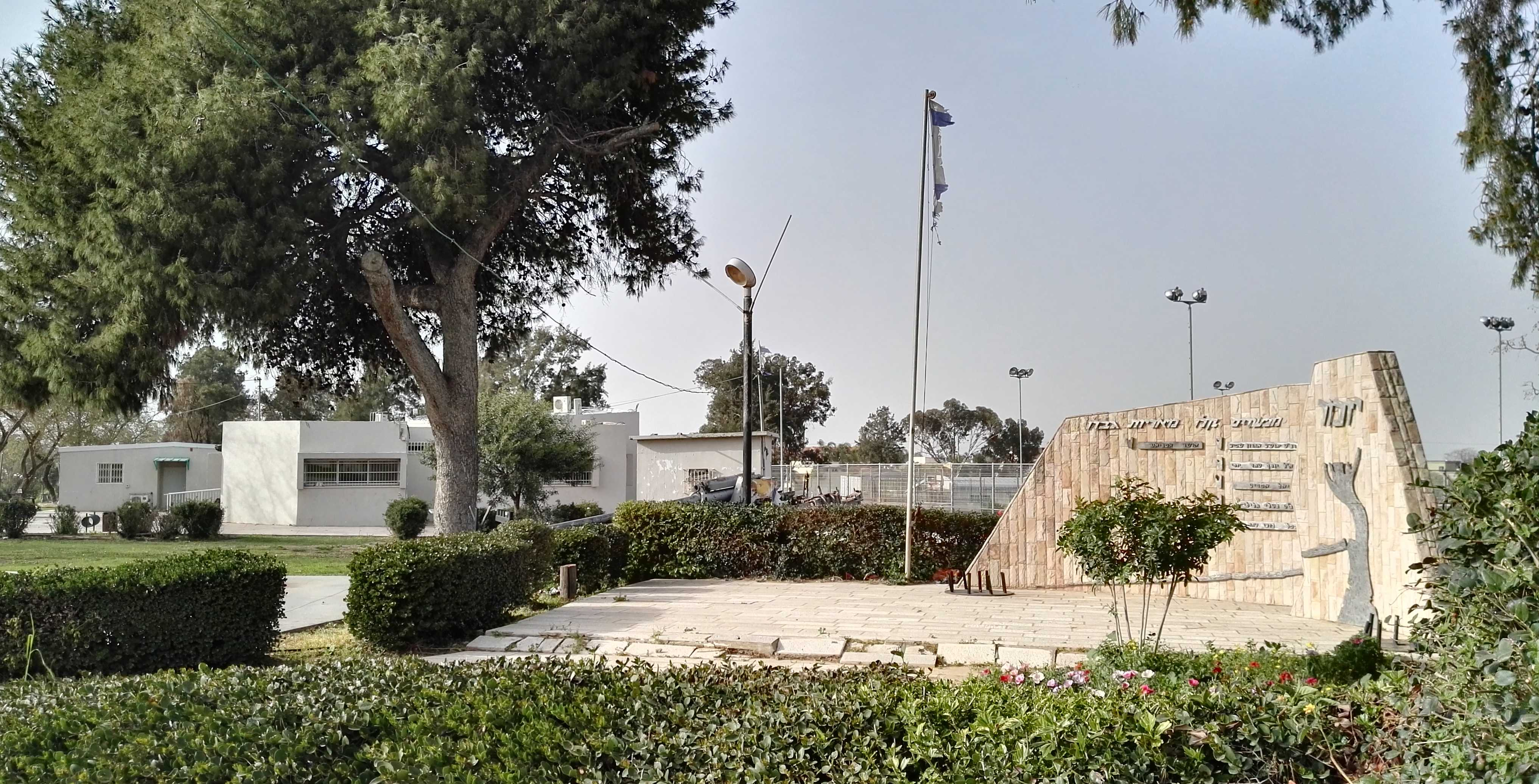

- Location within Ashkelon region of Israel Location within Israel
- Coordinates: 31°45′1″N 34°41′45″E
- Country: Israel
- District: Southern
- Subdistrict: Ashkelon
- Council: Be'er Tuvia
- Affiliation: Moshavim Movement
- Founded: 1950
- Founder: Tunisian Jews
- Population (2024): 1,671

Azrikam (Hebrew: עַזְרִיקָם) is a moshav in southern Israel. Located near Ashdod, it falls under the jurisdiction of Be'er Tuvia Regional Council. In 2024 it had a population of 1,671.

== Etymology ==
The village is named after "Azrikam, a descendant of Zerubbabel." (1 Chronicles 3:23)

== History ==
The moshav was established in 1950 by Jewish refugees from Tunisia. The site is located near the former depopulated Palestinian villages of Bayt Daras and al-Batani al-Gharbi. It was initially named Bitanya. In the first few years, the moshav's residents lived in tents without electricity, water or gas.

== Economy ==
In Moshav Azrikam there are about 35 farms that make a living from agricultural activities that include barns and chicken coops as well as orchards of deciduous fruits and vegetable fields.

The settlement has about 300 dunams of common orchard and about five hundred dunams of farming. Most of the residents of the moshav do not engage in agriculture: most of them are day laborers - wage workers and self-employed workers who work outside the moshav.

A branch of the youth movement 'Zionist Youth Movement' operates in Moshav.
