= Posh (Haganah unit) =

Elite Jewish strike force during the British Mandate of Palestine

Plugot Sadeh
- פלוגות שדה
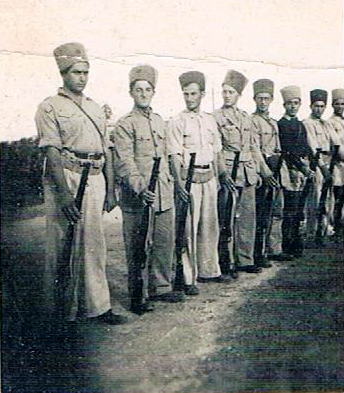
- POSH unit in Kfar Bilu, 1938
- Active: 1936–1939
- Disbanded: 1939
- Country: Mandatory Palestine
- Type: Commando
- Size: 1,500 fighters (by March 1938)
- Part of: Haganah
- Garrison/HQ: Various locations in Mandatory Palestine
- Engagements: 1936–1939 Arab revolt in Palestine

Commanders
- Notable commanders: Yitzhak Sadeh

POSH (Hebrew: פו״ש, also romanized Fosh, an abbreviation for Plugot Sadeh; פלוגות שדה, 'Field Companies') was an elite Jewish strike force that served as the commando arm of the Haganah during the 1936–1939 Arab revolt in Palestine when the country was under British Mandate control.

POSH members were hand-picked by Yitzhak Sadeh, commander of the Jewish Settlement Police.

By March 1938, POSH had 1,500 trained fighters divided into 13 regional groups. They were armed with British SMLEs, grenades, rifles and some small arms, and operated in swift commando style raids under Charles Orde Wingate's Special Night Squads (SNS), taking full advantage of their mobility.

POSH was disbanded in 1939 to create a larger force known as the Hish (Heil Sadeh, "Field Corps"). During World War II POSH veterans were trained by the British for commando night raids.

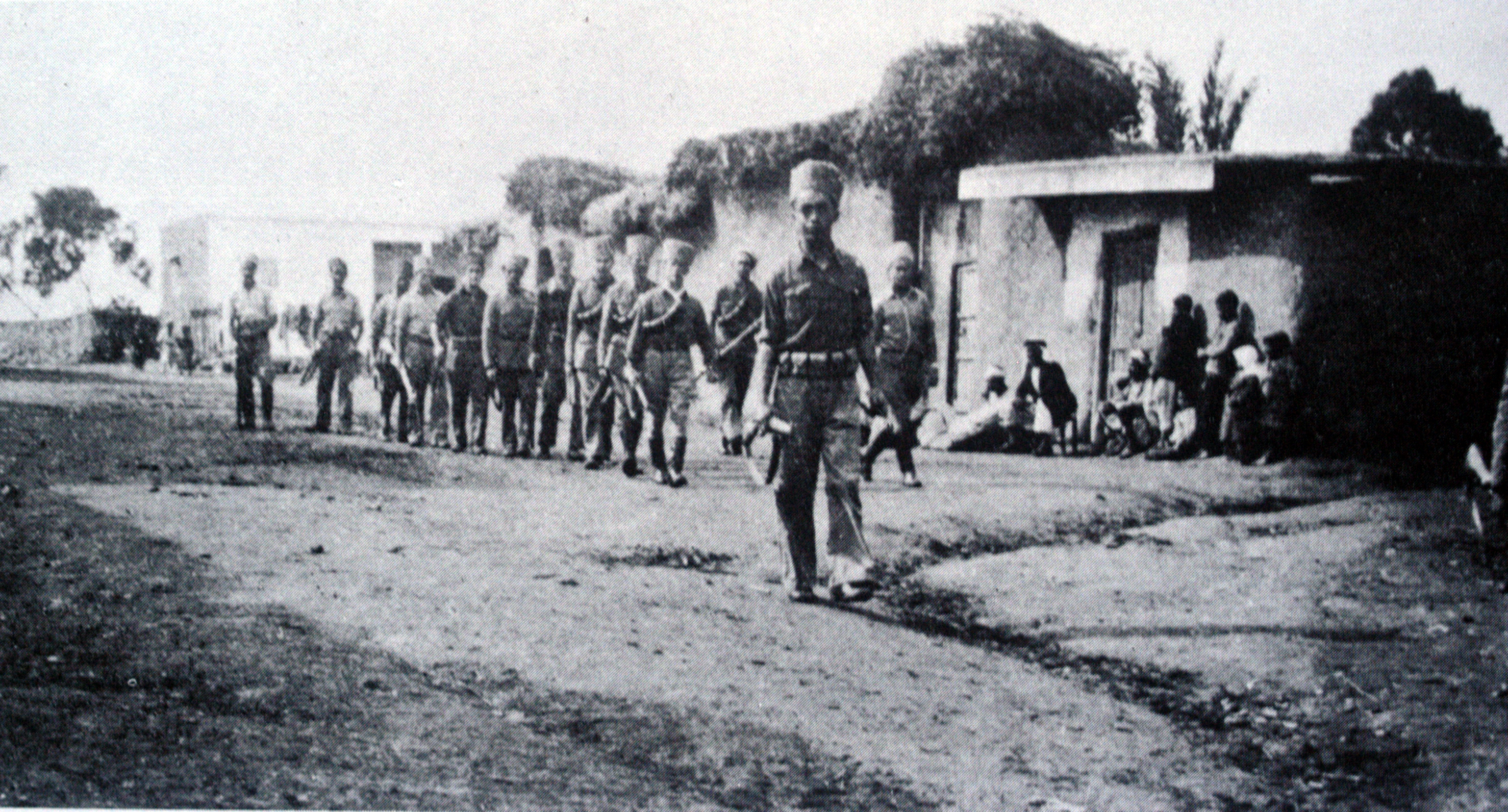
A POSH unit passes through Yasur, Gaza, 1938
