= Giv'ati =

Moshav in southern Israel

Giv'ati: גבעתי (Hebrew); غيفعاتي (Arabic)
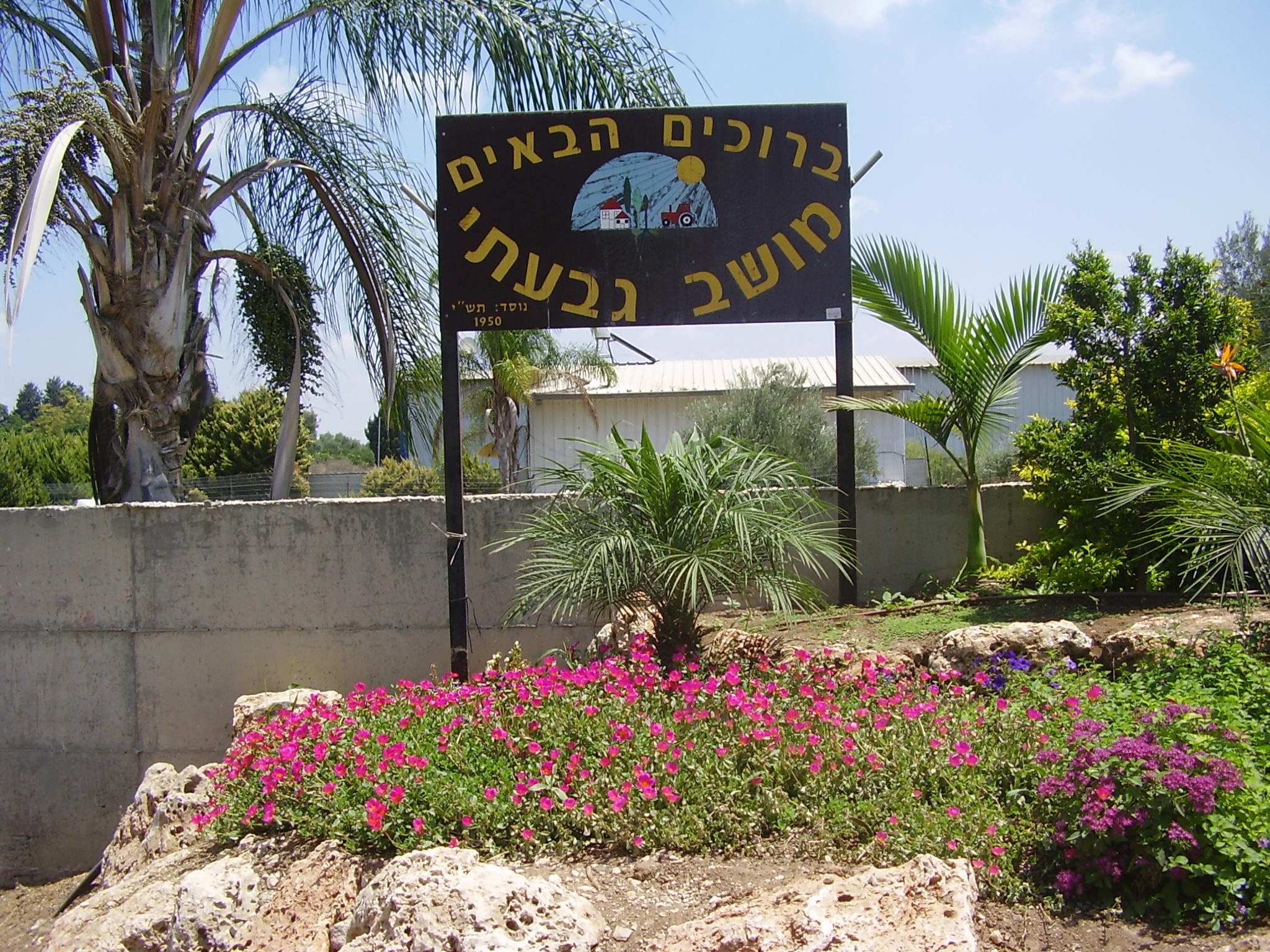

- Location within Ashkelon region of Israel
- Coordinates: 31°43′56″N 34°40′48″E
- Country: Israel
- District: Southern
- Subdistrict: Ashkelon
- Council: Be'er Tuvia
- Affiliation: Moshavim Movement
- Founded: 1950
- Founder: IDF veterans and immigrants from Egypt
- Population (2024): 1,261

Giv'ati (Hebrew: גִּבְעָתִי) is a moshav in southern Israel. Located near Ashdod, it falls under the jurisdiction of Be'er Tuvia Regional Council. In 2024 it had a population of 1,261.

== History ==
The moshav was founded by IDF veterans and Jewish refugees from Egypt, on the site of the former Palestinian Arab village of Bayt Daras. It was named after the Giv'ati Brigade of the IDF, which stopped the Egyptian Army from entering Israel from the south in the 1948 Arab–Israeli War.

== Economy ==
Pashut Yarok ("Simply Green") is a Giv'ati-based company that has developed and manufactures Shock Pad, a shock-absorbing, water- and fireproof material uniquely produced from discarded polyethylene, currently used in playgrounds and with the potential of being used as insulation in house construction.
