= Shtulim =

Moshav in southern Israel

Shtulim: שתולים (Hebrew)
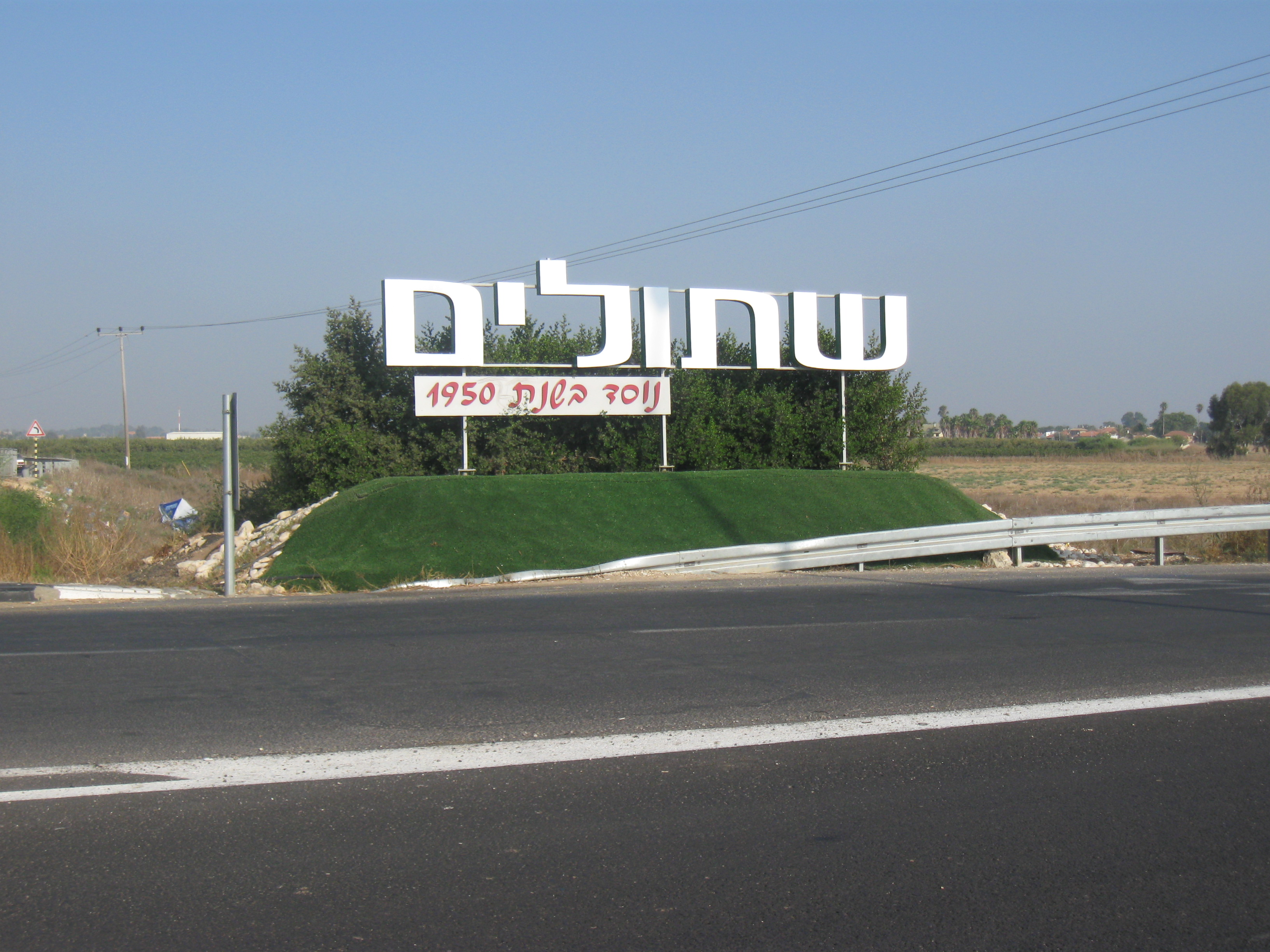

- Location within Ashkelon region of Israel
- Coordinates: 31°46′24″N 34°41′2″E
- Country: Israel
- District: Southern
- Subdistrict: Ashkelon
- Council: Be'er Tuvia
- Affiliation: Moshavim Movement
- Founded: 1950
- Founder: Yemenite Jewish refugees
- Population (2024): 2,224
- Website: www.shtulim.co.il

Shtulim (Hebrew: שְׁתוּלִים, lit. 'Planted') is a moshav in south-central Israel. Located near Ashdod, it falls under the jurisdiction of Be'er Tuvia Regional Council. In 2024 it had a population of 2,224.

== History ==
The moshav was founded in 1950 by Jewish refugees from Yemen, with the name taken from a passage in the Book of Psalms 92:13: "They are planted in the house of the Lord, they flourish in the courts of our God."

Shtulim was built at a site near the former Palestinian village of Isdud, which was depopulated in the 1948 Arab-Israeli War.

It has been flooded multiple times due to its proximity to two rivers.
