= Talmei Yehiel =

Moshav in southern Israel

Talmei Yehiel: תלמי יחיאל (Hebrew)
- Location within Ashkelon region of Israel
- Coordinates: 31°45′13″N 34°45′47″E
- Country: Israel
- District: Southern
- Subdistrict: Ashkelon
- Council: Be'er Tuvia
- Affiliation: Moshavim Movement
- Founded: 1949
- Founder: Bulgarian and Romanian Jewish immigrants
- Population (2024): 982
- Website: talmey-yechiel.org

Talmei Yehiel (Hebrew: תַּלְמֵי יְחִיאֵל, lit. 'Yehiel Furrows') is a moshav in central Israel. Located near Kiryat Malachi, it falls under the jurisdiction of Be'er Tuvia Regional Council. In 2024 it had a population of 982.

== History ==
The moshav was founded in 1949 by Jewish immigrants from Bulgaria and Romania, on the lands of the depopulated Palestinian village of Yasur. It was named after Yechiel Chelnov, a Russian Zionist leader.
