= Bitzaron =

Moshav in southern Israel

Bitzaron: בִּצָּרוֹן (Hebrew); بيتسارون (Arabic)
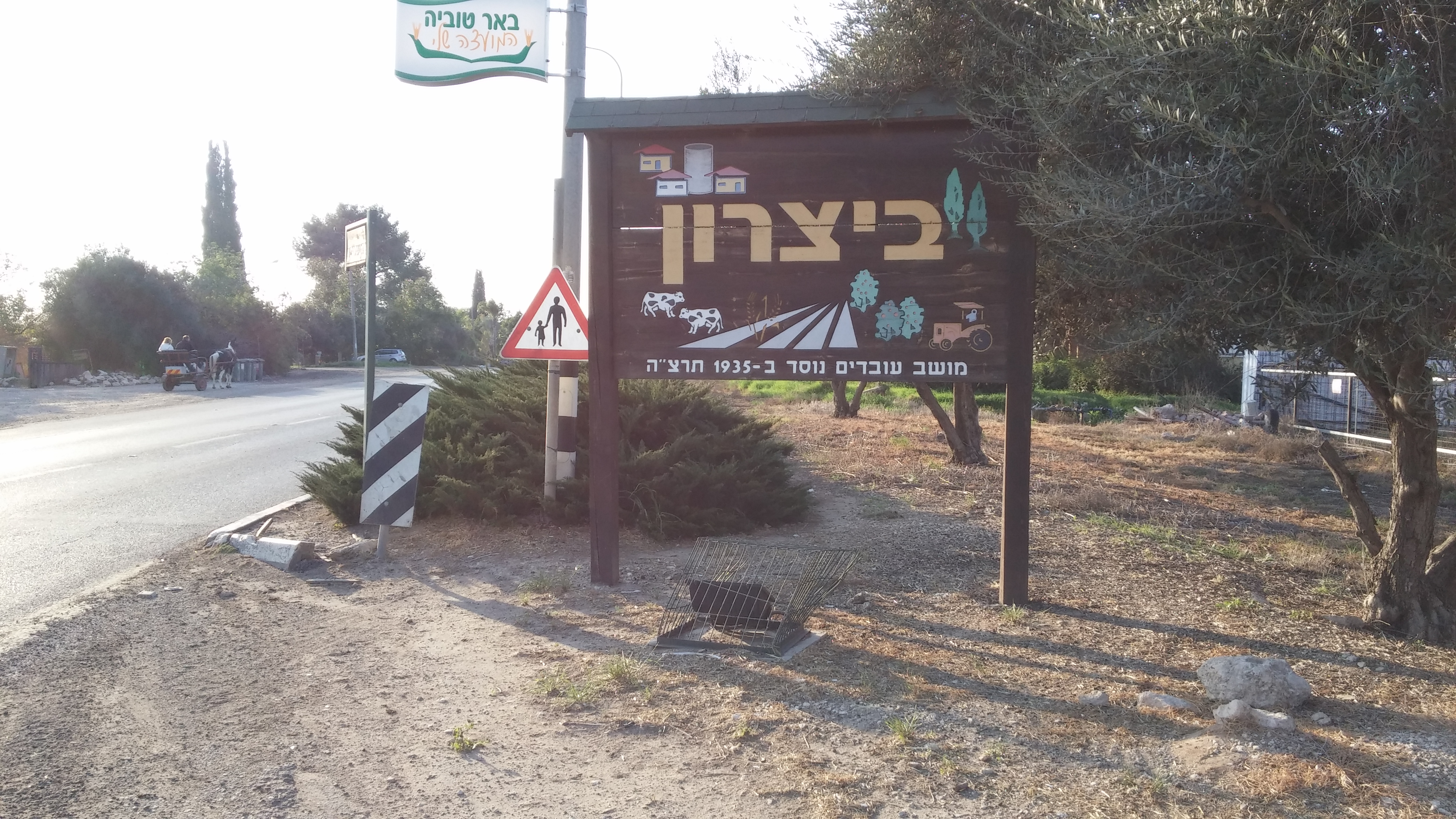
- Entrance

- Location within Ashkelon region of Israel Location within Israel
- Coordinates: 31°47′38″N 34°43′38″E
- Country: Israel
- District: Southern
- Subdistrict: Ashkelon
- Council: Be'er Tuvia
- Affiliation: Moshavim Movement
- Founded: 1935
- Founder: Soviet refuseniks
- Population (2024): 1,330

Bitzaron (Hebrew: בִּצָּרוֹן, lit. Stronghold) is a moshav in southern Israel. Located on local road 3811, between Gan Yavne and Bnei Ayish, it falls under the jurisdiction of Be'er Tuvia Regional Council. In 2024 its population was 1,330; its area is around 5,000 dunams (5 km^{2}).

== History ==
Bitzaron was founded in 1935, on JNF lands, with the help of Keren Hayesod. In a book about Jewish villages in Mandatory Palestine, the JNF says that the founders of Bitzaron organized themselves in 1929 before settling on the land as the Tel Hai group, and that in 1947 the population was 175. A second wave of residents, including recently demobilized soldiers and their families arrived shortly after the 1948 Arab-Israeli War. They were settled along a road, called Soldiers' Street, running west from the center of the moshav. A third wave of new residents, many of whom were new immigrants from Bulgaria, were settled along a road that runs east from the center.

Its name was taken from the Book of Zechariah 9:12: "Return to your stronghold, you prisoners of hope."

During the 1948 Arab–Israeli War, Bitzaron was on the front lines in the battle against the Egyptian army, and was bombarded by the Egyptian air force. The women and children of the village were evacuated to Rishon LeZion and Ness Ziona, while the men stayed to fight.

== Economy ==
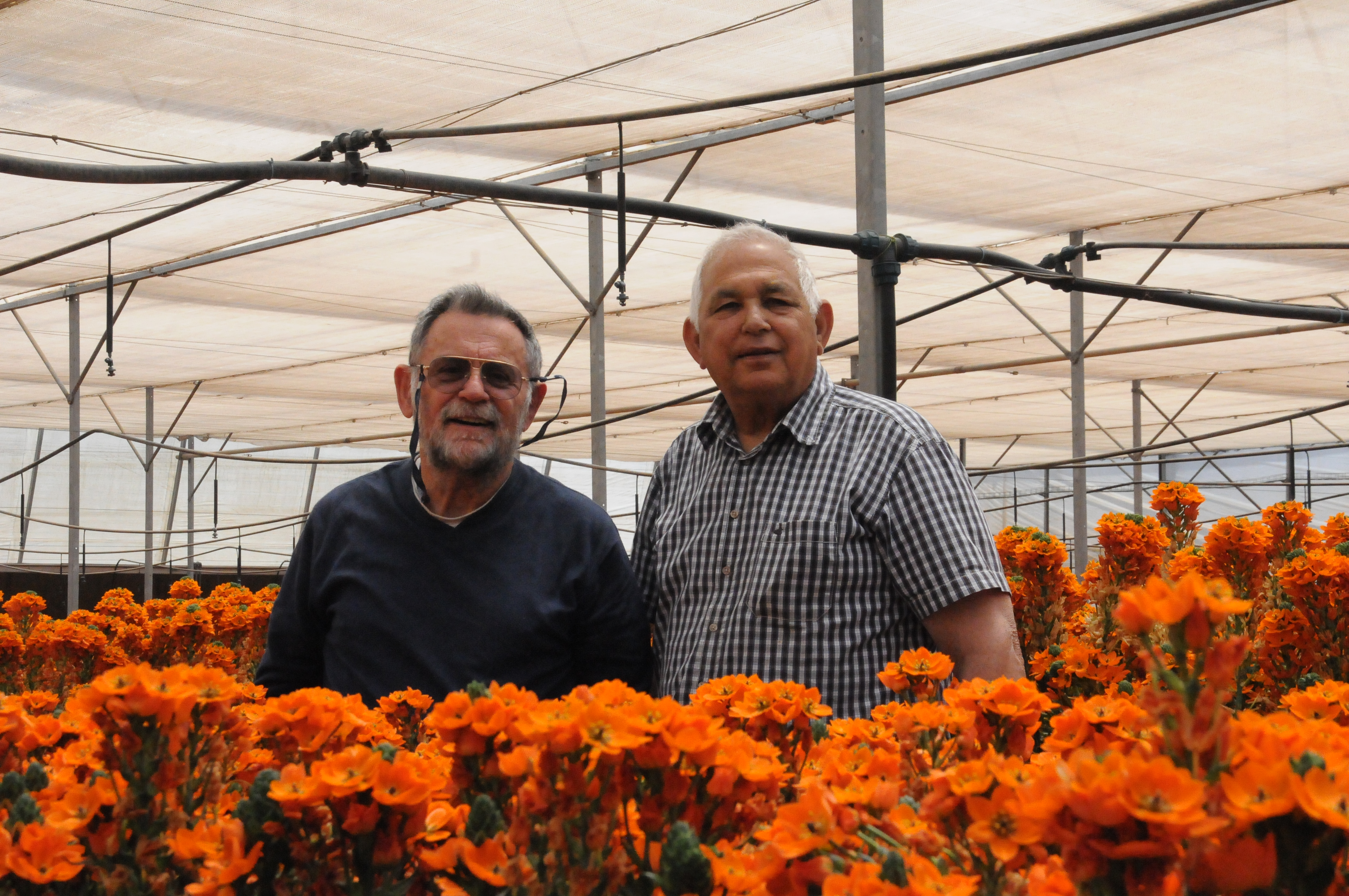
Flowers

Bitzaron's economy is based on agriculture and dairy farming. The moshav has numerous citrus groves.

It is also notable for its buffalo dairy, founded by Irit and Hagai Treister, which also serves as a tourist attraction and contains a number of ad hoc facilities. The buffalo herd was imported from Italy in 1995.
