= Nir Banim =

Moshav in southern Israel

Nir Banim: ניר בנים (Hebrew)
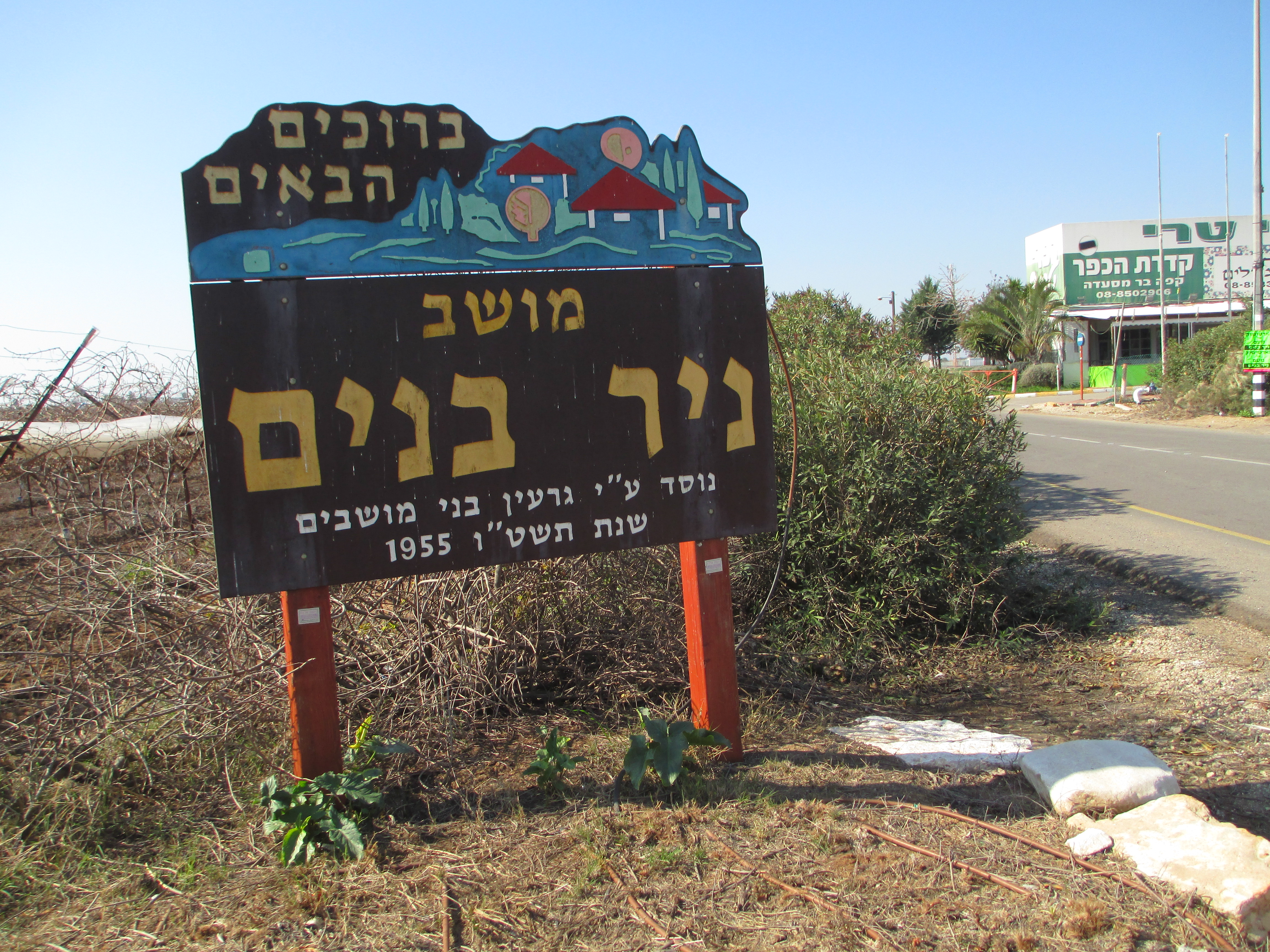

- Location within Ashkelon region of Israel
- Coordinates: 31°40′20″N 34°45′15″E
- Country: Israel
- District: Southern
- Subdistrict: Ashkelon
- Council: Be'er Tuvia
- Affiliation: Moshavim Movement
- Founded: 1954
- Founder: Sons from other moshavim
- Population (2024): 804

Nir Banim (Hebrew: נִיר בָּנִים, lit. 'Sons' Meadow') is a moshav in south-central Israel. Located between Kiryat Gat and Kiryat Malakhi, it falls under the jurisdiction of Be'er Tuvia Regional Council. In 2024 it had a population of 804.

== History ==
The moshav was founded in 1954 by sons of residents of the moshavim of Be'er Tuvia, Kfar Vitkin, Kfar Yehezkel, Nahalal and Herut. This was also the source of its name. It was established on the lands of the depopulated Palestinian village of al-Sawafir al-Sharqiyya.

== Notable people ==
- Nitzan Alon
