= Orot =

Moshav in southern Israel

Orot: אורות (Hebrew)
- Location within Ashkelon region of Israel
- Coordinates: 31°44′25″N 34°44′6″E
- Country: Israel
- District: Southern
- Subdistrict: Ashkelon
- Council: Be'er Tuvia
- Affiliation: Moshavim Movement
- Founded: 1952
- Founder: American, Canadian, and South African Jewish immigrants
- Population (2024): 553

Orot (Hebrew: אוֹרוֹת, lit. 'Lights') is a moshav in south Israel. Located near Kiryat Malakhi and covering an area of 2,000 dunams, it falls under the jurisdiction of Be'er Tuvia Regional Council. In 2024 it had a population of 553.

== History ==
The moshav was founded in 1952 by Jewish immigrants from the United States, Canada, and South Africa who were members of the Working Farmer movement. Its name is derived from Chapter 26, verse 19 of the Book of Isaiah: "Your dew is as the dew of the lights; the earth will give birth to her dead."
