= Beit Ezra =

Moshav in southern Israel

Beit Ezra: בֵּית עֶזְרָא (Hebrew); بيت عزرا (Arabic)
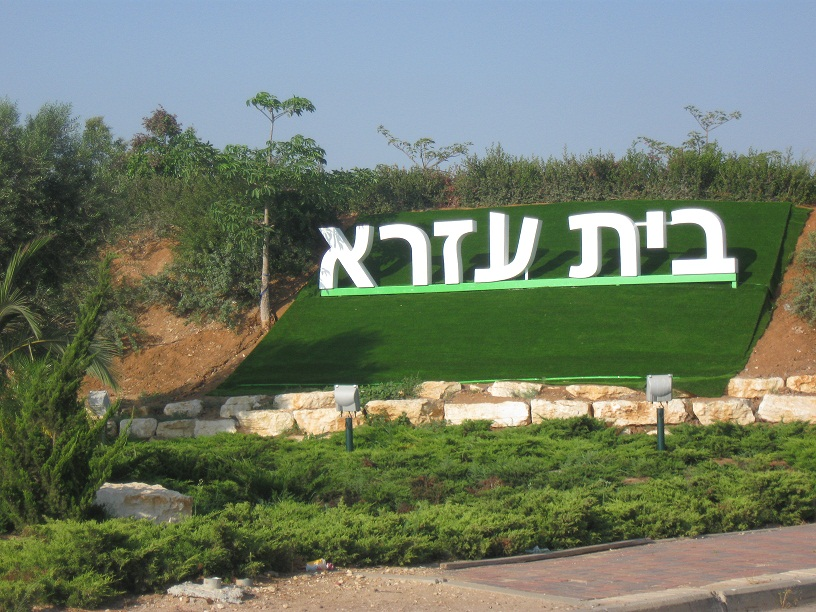
- Etymology: House of Ezra
- Location within Ashkelon region of Israel Location within Israel
- Coordinates: 31°44′12″N 34°39′21″E
- Country: Israel
- District: Southern
- Subdistrict: Ashkelon
- Council: Be'er Tuvia
- Affiliation: Moshavim Movement
- Founded: 1950
- Founder: Iraqi Jewish refugees
- Population (2024): 1,167

Beit Ezra (Hebrew: בֵּית עֶזְרָא, lit. House of Ezra) is a moshav in southern Israel. Located between Ashdod and Ashkelon on the Israeli coastal plain, it falls under the jurisdiction of Be'er Tuvia Regional Council. In 2024 it had a population of 1,167.

== History ==
The moshav was founded in 1950 by Jewish refugees from Iraq, and was named after Ezra. The site of the moshav is on the land of the depopulated Palestinian village of Hamama. South of the moshav is Hill 69, which served as a military post and was the scene of fighting during the 1948 Arab–Israeli War. Also nearby is the Ad Halom bridge at which the Egyptian army was stopped during their advance towards Tel Aviv.
