= Avigdor =

Moshav in southern Israel

Avigdor: אֲבִיגְדוֹר (Hebrew); أفيغدور (Arabic)

Hebrew transcription(s)
  - Official: Avigedor
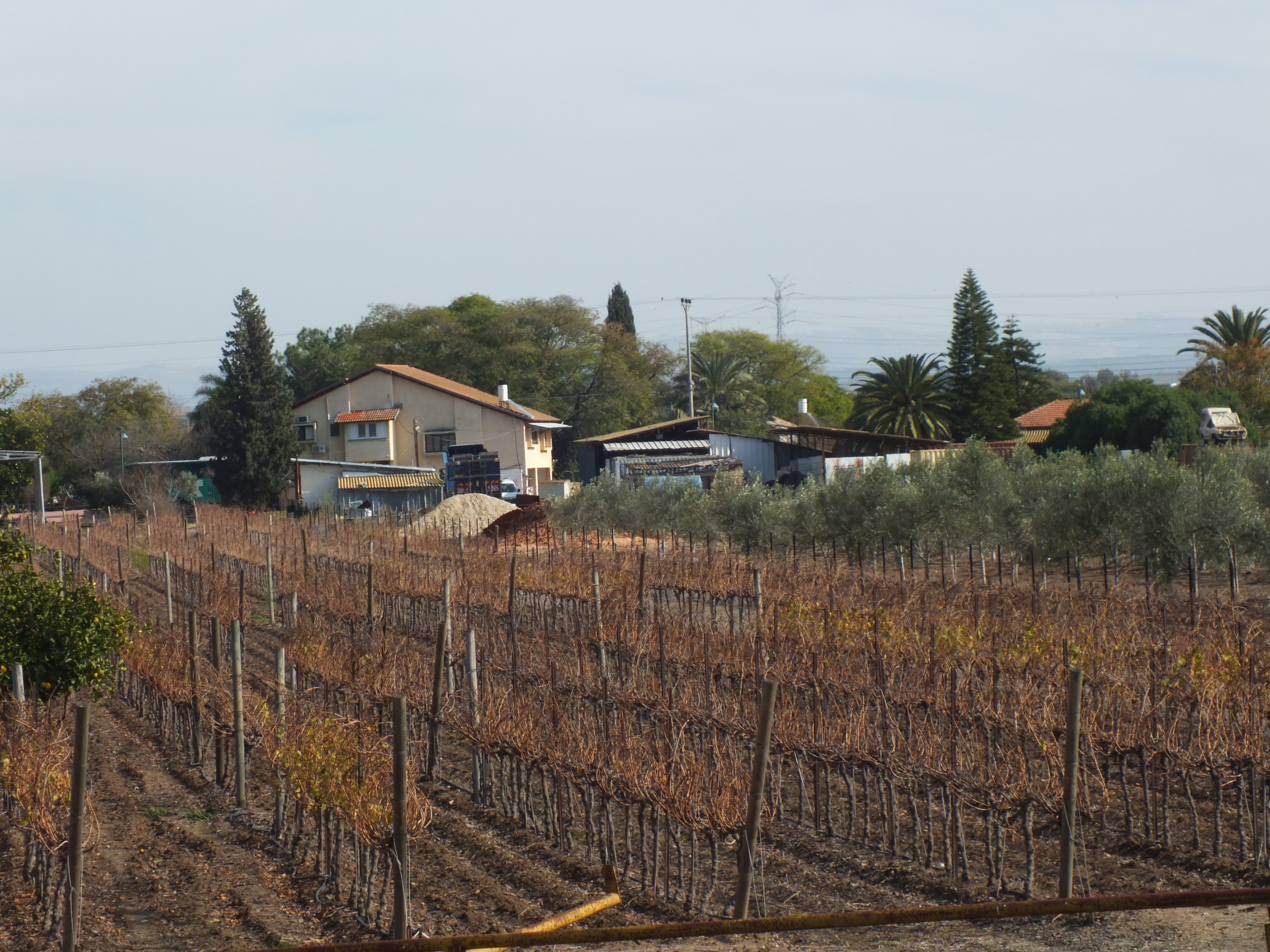
- Avigdor

- Location within Ashkelon region of Israel Location within Israel
- Coordinates: 31°42′34″N 34°44′38″E
- Country: Israel
- District: Southern
- Subdistrict: Ashkelon
- Council: Be'er Tuvia
- Affiliation: Moshavim Movement
- Founded: 1950
- Founder: Jewish British Army veterans
- Population (2024): 947
- Website: www.moshav-avigdor.com

Avigdor (Hebrew: אֲבִיגְדוֹר) a small moshav in southern Israel. Located south of Kiryat Malakhi and 11 km north of Kiryat Gat and covering 3.75 km², it falls under the jurisdiction of Be'er Tuvia Regional Council. In 2024 its population was 947.

== History ==
It was founded in 1950 by veterans of the British Army and was initially named Yaʿel, the initials of Hebrew Units for Transportation, the unit that the veterans belonged to during the war. The commander of the unit was Henry d'Avigdor-Goldsmid, the son of Sir Osmond Elim d’Avigdor-Goldsmid. Later the name was changed and now it derives its name from the Zionist Sir Osmond Elim d’Avigdor-Goldsmid, an Englishman, president of the Palestine Jewish Colonization Association between the years 1934–1939 that donated to the moshav the municipality.

It was founded on the lands of the depopulated Palestinian village of Qastina.

The population is partly agriculturist, and their main occupations are dairy farming, turkeys and chicken and various field crops and partly free profession (lawyer, accountant, engineer, etc.) In the last years there is a development and building momentum.

== Election Results ==
About 81% of Avigdor's eligible voters voted in the 2026 Israeli legislative elections, compared with a 78% national voter turnout. Yashar received about 41% of Avigdor's votes, followed by Together with 18% and The Democrats with 15%.
