= Sde Uziyahu =

Moshav in the Be'er Tuvia Regional Council in Southern Israel

Sde Uziyahu: שדה עוזיהו (Hebrew); سدي عوزياهو (Arabic)
- Location within Ashkelon region of Israel
- Coordinates: 31°45′22″N 34°40′37″E
- Country: Israel
- District: Southern
- Subdistrict: Ashkelon
- Council: Be'er Tuvia
- Affiliation: HaOved HaTzioni
- Founded: 1950
- Founder: Libyan Jewish refugees
- Population (2024): 1,557

Sde Uziyahu (Hebrew: שְׂדֵה עוֹזִיָּהוּ, lit. Uzziah Field) is a moshav in southern Israel. Located near the city of Ashdod, it falls under the jurisdiction of Be'er Tuvia Regional Council. In 2024 it had a population of 1,557.

== History ==
Sde Uziyahu was founded in 1950. Originally named Ashdod D, Yad Shimshon and Uziyah, it was finally named after Uzziah of Judah (Uziyahu in Hebrew), who, according to the Bible, built cities in the current location of the moshav.

Sde Uziyahu is located near the former Arab village of Isdud, which was depopulated in the 1948 Arab-Israeli War.
