= Ezer, Israel =

Community settlement in southern Israel

Ezer: עֵזֶר (Hebrew)
- Location within Ashkelon region of Israel
- Coordinates: 31°44′12″N 34°40′15″E
- Country: Israel
- District: Southern
- Subdistrict: Ashkelon
- Council: Be'er Tuvia
- Founded: 1966
- Population (2024): 686

Ezer (Hebrew: עֵזֶר) is a community settlement in southern Israel. Located between Ashdod and Ashkelon near the Mediterranean coast, it falls under the jurisdiction of Be'er Tuvia Regional Council. In 2024 it had a population of 686.

== History ==
The village was founded in 1966 as a rural centre for the surrounding moshavim (a rural centre was a form of settlement in the 1950s to early 1980s, intended as place for pooling means of production, providing services, and as a cultural centre for the agricultural settlements around it). In 1990, Erez expanded and became a community settlement. It houses religious facilities such as a mikvah and a synagogue.
