= Kannot =

Youth village in southern Israel

Kannot: כַּנּוֹת (Hebrew)
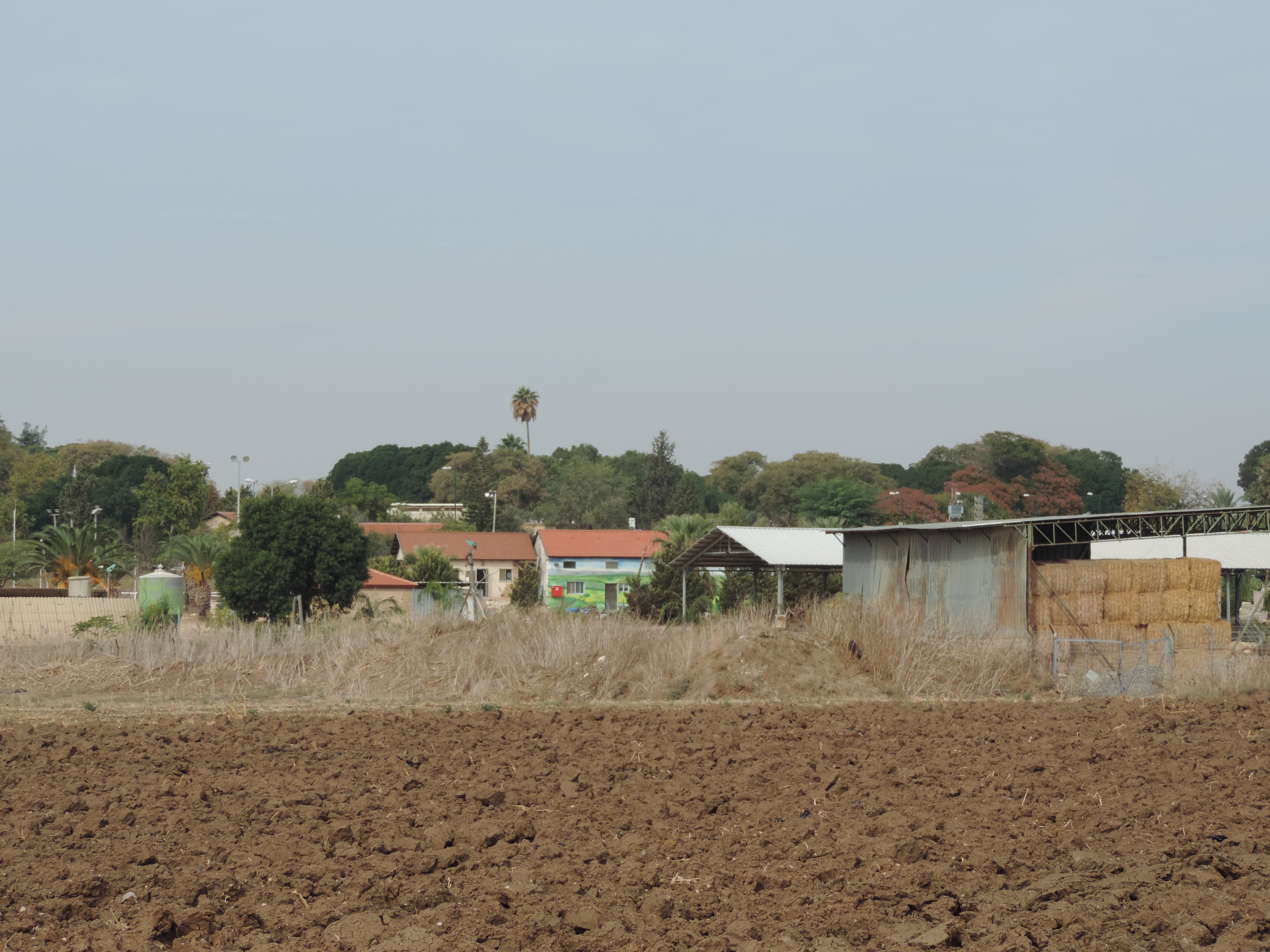
- Etymology: Seedlings
- Location within Ashkelon region of Israel
- Coordinates: 31°48′8″N 34°45′9″E
- Country: Israel
- District: Southern
- Subdistrict: Ashkelon
- Council: Be'er Tuvia
- Founded: 1952
- Founder: Histadrut Workers' Council
- Population (2024): 82
- Website: kannot.org.il

Kannot (Hebrew: כַּנּוֹת, lit. 'Seedlings') is an educational institution and youth village in central Israel. Located near Gedera, it falls under the jurisdiction of Be'er Tuvia Regional Council. In 2024 it had a population of 82.

== Etymology ==
It is named after an occasional word, just mentioned once: in the Bible in Psalm 80:16: (God, watch over) "the seedling your right hand has planted".

== History ==
The village was founded in 1952 by the Workers' Council of the Histadrut, at a site on the lands of the Palestinian village of Bashshit that was depopulated in 1948.
