= Hamama =

Hamama حمامة Hamameh
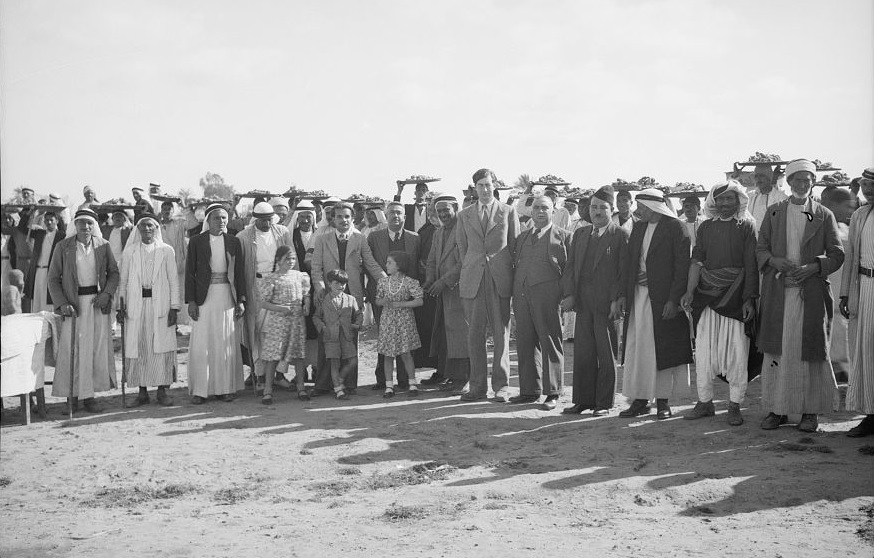
- People of Hamama with Governor Aref al Aref and the 2nd Earl of Oxford and Asquith, in 1943
- Etymology: "dove"
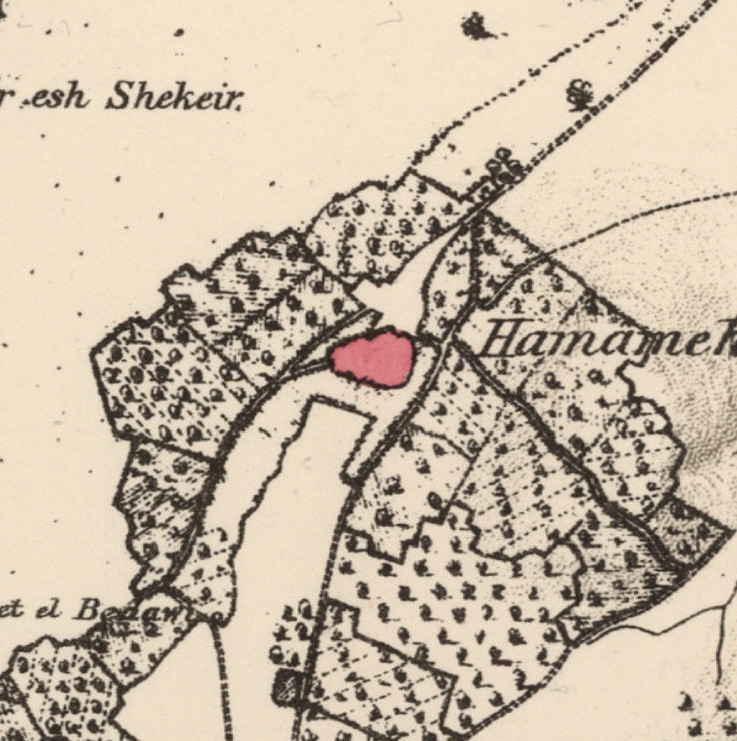
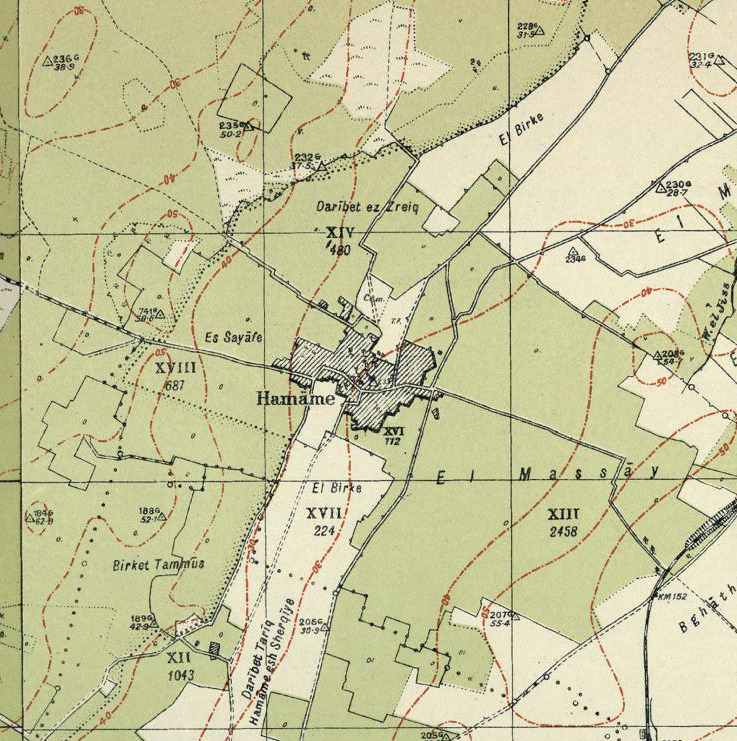
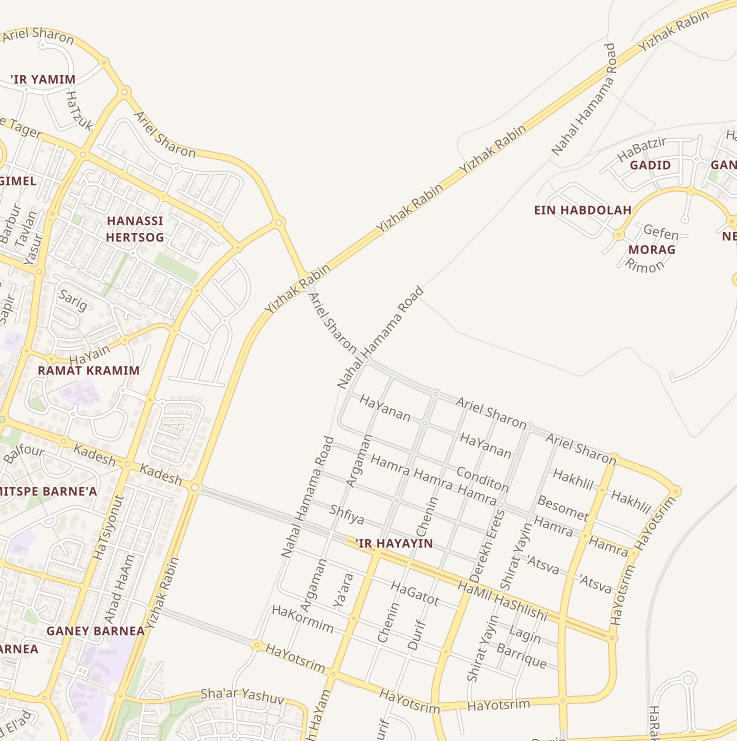
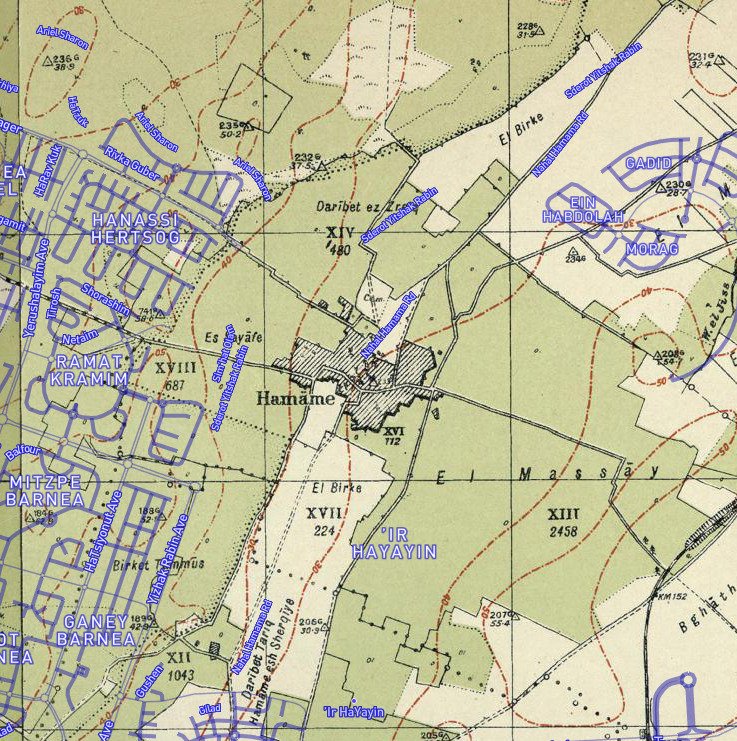
- 1870s map 1940s map modern map 1940s with modern overlay map A series of historical maps of the area around Hamama (click the buttons)

- Location within Mandatory Palestine
- Coordinates: 31°41′35″N 34°35′32″E
- Palestine grid: 111/122
- Geopolitical entity: Mandatory Palestine
- Subdistrict: Gaza
- Date of depopulation: 4 November 1948

Area
  - Total: 41.4 km^{2} (16.0 sq mi)

Population (1945)
  - Total: 5,070
- Cause(s) of depopulation: Military assault by Yishuv forces
- Current Localities: Nitzanim, Beit Ezra, Eshkolot

Hamama (Arabic: حمامة) was a Palestinian town of over 5,000 inhabitants that was depopulated during the 1948 Arab–Israeli War. It was located 24 kilometers north of Gaza. It was continuously inhabited from the Mamluk period (c. 1270) until 1948.

The site had been previously inhabited from the Hellenistic through the Roman and Byzantine periods, flourishing during the latter. It has been suggested that the settlement there was the city known from sources by the Greek name of Peleia, but some are placing that city closer to Ascalon. The site has been used to build a new neighbourhood in the northern part of the Israeli city of Ashkelon, after undergoing a rescue dig.

== Etymology ==
The Arabic name *Ḥamāma* means "dove," and as the site has been inhabited since at least the Hellenistic period, with remains from the Roman and Byzantine eras, it may be a translation of the earlier village name *Peleia/Palaia* (Greek for "dove"), though this identification is not conclusive and that village may have been closer to Ascalon. Alternative explanations include a tradition linking the name to a military encampment at the site (*Wādī al-Ḥima*).

== History ==
=== Byzantine city ===
In the fifth century CE, a Byzantine city rose at the site, possibly one known from written sources as Peleia, although there is no consensus about it.

Remains from the fifth and sixth century CE have been found there, together with Byzantine ceramics. A fragment of a Greek stone inscription discovered there is currently held at the Louvre in Paris.

=== Crusader period ===
Hamama was located outside Ascalon and near the site of a battle in 1099 between the Crusaders and the Fatimids, resulting in a Crusader victory. There are very few archaeological findings datable to the Crusader period, and sources from that time do not mention Hamama.

=== Mamluk period ===
During the Mamluk period, the area passed into Muslim hands.

During the Mandate time, the village was visited by inspectors from the Department of Antiquities who noted two mosques. One of these, known as Shaykh Ibrahim Abi Arqub, included marble columns and capitals in the iwan. The eponymous mosque was affiliated with a mujāhid and descendant of ʿUmar b. al-Khaṭṭāb. The other mosque, known as Shaykh Hamid, also incorporated marble fragments. Neither of these mosques have survived. Mandatory archaeologists documented a marble slab (0.3×0.95 m) located on the western wall of the mosque of Ibrāhīm Abū ʿArqūb. This slab featured a nine-line Arabic inscription, now unfortunately lost, which was dated to 700 AH/1301 CE, and the content of which remains unrecorded.

By 1333/4 CE (734 AH) some of the income from the village formed part of a waqf of the tomb (turba) and madrasa of Aqbugha b. Abd Allah in Cairo. In 1432, it is reported that the Mamluk sultan Barsbay passed through the village. In this period, a renowned scholar and preacher at the al-Aqsa Mosque, Ahmad al-Shafi'i (1406–1465), was born there.

=== Ottoman period ===
Hamama, like the rest of Palestine, was incorporated into the Ottoman Empire in 1517. In first Ottoman tax register of 1526/7 the village had a population of 31 Muslim households and one bachelor, and it belonged to the nahiya of Gaza (Gaza Sanjak). In the tax registers of 1596 it had a population of 84 Muslim households, an estimated 462 persons. The villagers paid taxes on goats and beehives, in addition to occasional revenues; a total of 6,800 akçe. All of the revenue went to a waqf. Its residents came from various places, including the Hauran, and Egypt. During this time, the village functioned as an important stop between Isdud and Majdal 'Asqalan along the Cairo-Damascus road.

The seventeenth-century traveller al-Nabulsi recorded that the tomb (qabr) of Shaykh Ibrahim Abi Arqub was located in the village, while the Syrian Sufi teacher and traveller Mustafa al-Bakri al-Siddiqi (1688–1748/9) (ar) visited Hamama in the first half of the eighteenth century, after leaving al-Jura.

Marom and Taxel have shown that during the seventeenth to eighteenth centuries, nomadic economic and security pressures led to settlement abandonment around Majdal ‘Asqalān, and the southern coastal plain in general. The population of abandoned villages moved to surviving settlements, while the lands of abandoned settlements continued to be cultivated by neighboring villages. Thus, Hamama absorbed the lands of Ṣandaḥanna, Mi‘ṣaba, and excluded the lands of Bashsha, an exclave of al-Majdal.

Hamama appears on Jacotin's map drawn-up during Napoleon's invasion in 1799, though its position is interchanged with that of Majdal. In 1838, Hamameh was noted as a Muslim village in the Gaza district.

Local administrative restructuring began in the 1860s as tanzimat reforms were implemented at the district level. The construction of the "quarter system"—the partition of village land among groups of families—led to significant economic development, as evidenced by village land usage in the early twentieth century.

In 1863, the French explorer Victor Guérin visited the village, and noted a mosque constructed with ancient materials. The village had a population of "at least eight hundred souls". He further noted: "The gardens of Hamama are outstandingly fertile. They are divided by living fences of huge cactus pears, and are planted with olive, fig, pomegranate, mulberry and apricot trees. Here and there slender palm trees and broad treetops of sycamore trees rise above them."

An official Ottoman village list from about 1870 showed that Hamame had 193 houses and a population of 635, although it only counted the men.

=== British Mandate ===
Under the British Mandate in Palestine, a village council was established to administer local affairs, Hamama had a mosque, and two primary schools, one for boys and one for girls, established in 1921. British Mandate Ḥamāma had pre-planned new communities erected around the original village nucleus, with crisscrossed pathways separating the new residential quarters.

In the 1922 census of Palestine, conducted by the British Mandate authorities, Hamama had a population of 2,731; 2,722 Muslims and 9 Christians, where all the Christians were Orthodox. The population had increased in the 1931 census to 3,405; 3,401 Muslims and 4 Christians, in a total of 865 houses.

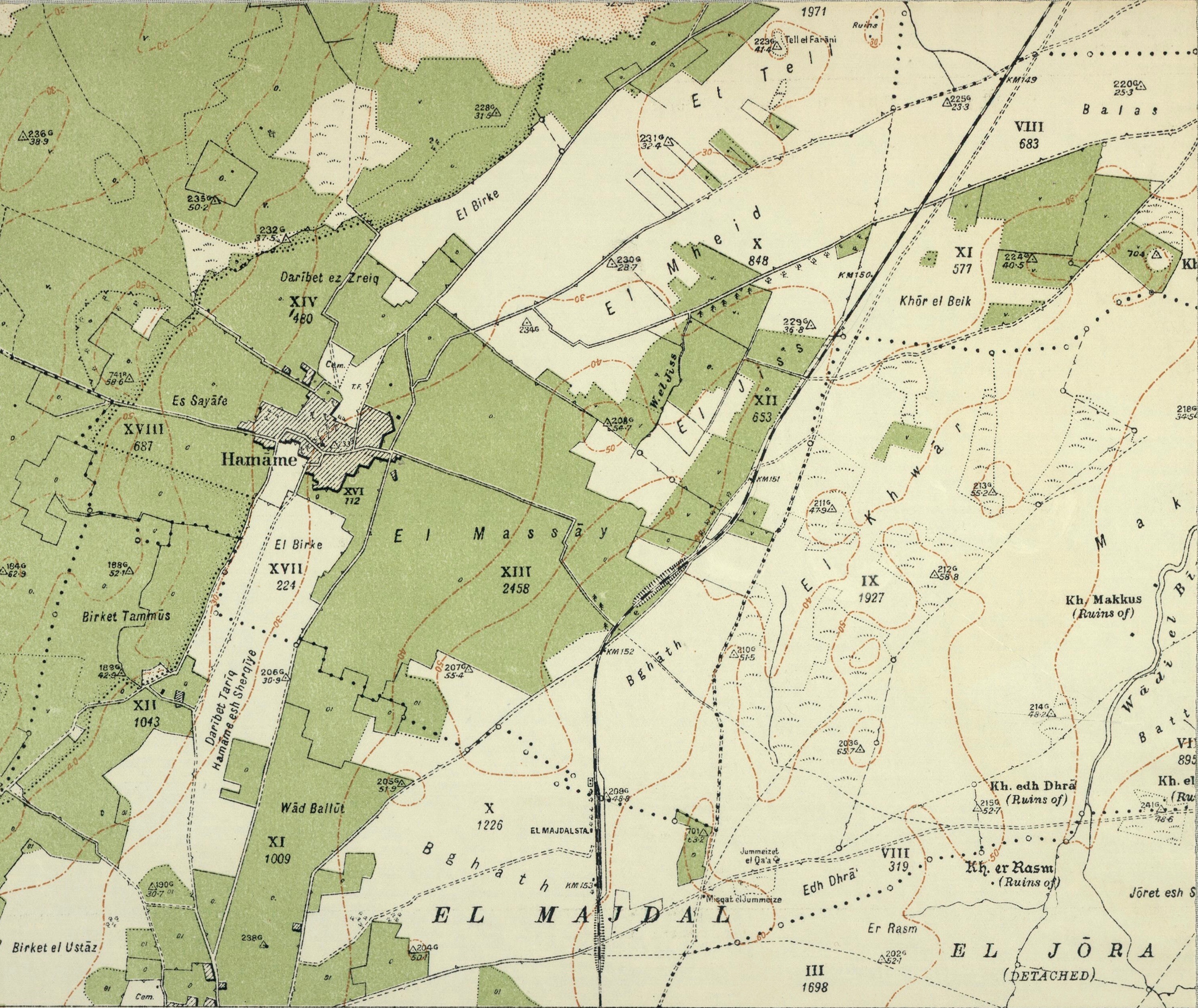
Hamama 1930 1:20,000

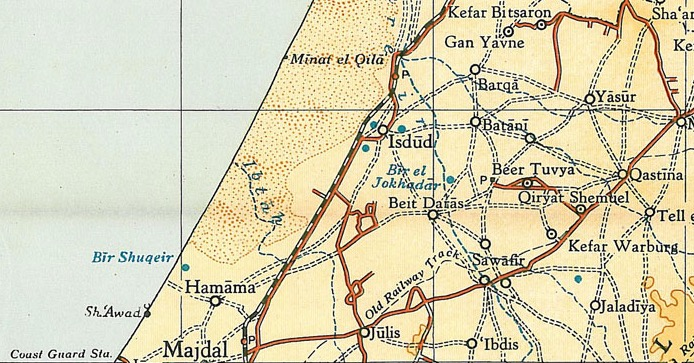
Hamama 1945 1:250,000 (lower left)

In the 1945 statistics Hamama had a population of 5,070; 5,000 Muslims, 10 Christians and 60 Jews, with a total of 41,366 dunams of land, according to an official land and population survey. Of this, 1,356 dunams were used for citrus and bananas, 4,459 dunams were for plantations and irrigable land, 28,890 for cereals, while 167 dunams were built-up (urban) land.

In the 1940s, British officials paved the road to the village for year-round automobile access.

In 1946, the boys' school had an enrollment of 338, and the girls' school an enrollment of 46. Its inhabitants engaged primarily in fishing and agriculture, cultivating grain, citrus, apricots, almonds, figs, olives, watermelons, and cantaloupes. Due to the existence of sand dunes in the north part of the town, trees were planted on parts of those lands to prevent soil erosion.

In addition to agriculture, residents practiced animal husbandry which formed was an important source of income for the village. In 1943, they owned 405 heads of cattle, 310 sheep over a year old, 172 goats over a year old, 228 camels, 11 horses, 9 mules, 567 donkey, 2963 fowls, 454 pigeons.

=== 1948, and aftermath ===
According to reports published by the newspaper Felesteen, Hamama was first drawn into the 1948 Arab–Israeli War after a group of workers from the town laboring in the adjacent fields were struck by Jewish residents from Nitzanim on January 22, 1948, leaving fifteen Arabs wounded. Two days later, a unit from Nitzanim opened fire on Hamama residents, killing one, and on February 17, a group of workers waiting for a bus on the road between Isdud and the town were fired upon, wounding two.

It was captured by Israel from the Egyptian Army in the first stage of Operation Yoav on October 28. By then several refugees from nearby towns were in Hamama, most of them, along with many of Hamama's residents, fled with the withdrawing Egyptian troops.

At the end of November 1948, Coastal Plain District troops carried out sweeps of the villages around and to the south of Majdal. Hamama was one of the villages named in the orders to the IDF battalions and engineers platoon, that the villagers were to be expelled to Gaza, and the IDF troops were "to prevent their return by destroying their villages." The path leading to the village was to be mined. The IDF troops were ordered to carry out the operation "with determination, accuracy and energy". The operation took place on 30 November. The troops found "not a living soul" in Hamama. However, the destruction of the villages was not completed immediately due to the dampness of the houses and the insufficient amount of explosives.

In 1992 it was noted: "No traces of village houses or landmarks remain. The site is overgrown with wild vegetation, including tall grasses, weeds, and bushes. It also contains cactuses. The surrounding land is unused."

Mohammed Dahlan's family and part of Ahmed Fouad Alkhatib's family are originally from Hamama.

== Bibliography ==
- Barron, J.B., ed. (1923). Palestine: Report and General Abstracts of the Census of 1922. Government of Palestine.
- Conder, C.R.; Kitchener, H.H. (1882). The Survey of Western Palestine: Memoirs of the Topography, Orography, Hydrography, and Archaeology. Vol. 2. London: Committee of the Palestine Exploration Fund.
- Dauphin, C. (1998). La Palestine byzantine, Peuplement et Populations. BAR International Series 726 (in French). Vol. III : Catalogue. Oxford: Archeopress. ISBN 0-860549-05-4.
- Elhassani, Abdelkarim (2012). From Hamama to Montreal. Xlibris Corporation. ISBN 9781479741243.
- Government of Palestine, Department of Statistics (1945). Village Statistics, April, 1945.
- Guérin, V. (1869). Description Géographique Historique et Archéologique de la Palestine (in French). Vol. 1: Judee, pt. 2. Paris: L'Imprimerie Nationale.
- Hadawi, S. (1970). Village Statistics of 1945: A Classification of Land and Area ownership in Palestine. Palestine Liberation Organization Research Center.
- Hartmann, M. (1883). "Die Ortschaftenliste des Liwa Jerusalem in dem türkischen Staatskalender für Syrien auf das Jahr 1288 der Flucht (1871)". Zeitschrift des Deutschen Palästina-Vereins. 6: 102–149.
- Hütteroth, W.-D.; Abdulfattah, K. (1977). Historical Geography of Palestine, Transjordan and Southern Syria in the Late 16th Century. Erlanger Geographische Arbeiten, Sonderband 5. Erlangen, Germany: Vorstand der Fränkischen Geographischen Gesellschaft. ISBN 3-920405-41-2.
- Karmon, Y. (1960). "An Analysis of Jacotin's Map of Palestine" (PDF). Israel Exploration Journal. 10 (3, 4): 155–173, 244–253. Archived from the original (PDF) on 2019-12-22.
- Khalidi, W. (1992). All That Remains: The Palestinian Villages Occupied and Depopulated by Israel in 1948. Washington D.C.: Institute for Palestine Studies. ISBN 0-88728-224-5.
- Marom, Roy; Taxel, Itamar (2023-10-01). "Ḥamāma: The historical geography of settlement continuity and change in Majdal 'Asqalan's hinterland, 1270–1750 CE". Journal of Historical Geography. 82: 49–65. doi:10.1016/j.jhg.2023.08.003. ISSN 0305-7488.
- Marom, Roy; Taxel, Itamar (2024-10-10). "Hamama: The Palestinian Countryside in Bloom (1750–1948)". Journal of Islamic Archaeology. 11 (1): 83–110. doi:10.1558/jia.26586. ISSN 2051-9729.
- Mills, E., ed. (1932). Census of Palestine 1931. Population of Villages, Towns and Administrative Areas. Jerusalem: Government of Palestine.
- Morris, B. (1987). The Birth of the Palestinian Refugee Problem 1947-1949. Cambridge University Press.
- Morris, B. (2004). The Birth of the Palestinian Refugee Problem Revisited. Cambridge University Press. ISBN 978-0-521-00967-6.
- MPF: Ipsirli and al-Tamimi (1982): The Muslim Pious Foundations and Real Estates in Palestine. Gazza, Al-Quds al-Sharif, Nablus and Ajlun Districts according to 16th-Century Ottoman Tahrir Registers, Organisation of Islamic Conference, Istanbul 1402/1982. Cited in Petersen (2001).
- Palmer, E.H. (1881). The Survey of Western Palestine: Arabic and English Name Lists Collected During the Survey by Lieutenants Conder and Kitchener, R. E. Transliterated and Explained by E.H. Palmer. Committee of the Palestine Exploration Fund.
- Petersen, Andrew (2001). A Gazetteer of Buildings in Muslim Palestine (British Academy Monographs in Archaeology). Vol. 1. Oxford University Press. ISBN 978-0-19-727011-0.
- Robinson, E.; Smith, E. (1841). Biblical Researches in Palestine, Mount Sinai and Arabia Petraea: A Journal of Travels in the year 1838. Vol. 3. Boston: Crocker & Brewster.
- Socin, A. (1879). "Alphabetisches Verzeichniss von Ortschaften des Paschalik Jerusalem". Zeitschrift des Deutschen Palästina-Vereins. 2: 135–163.
