= Bayt Daras =

Palestinian village depopulated in 1948

Bayt Daras بيت دراس Beit Daras, Baydarās-Badarās, Dāris Bethduras
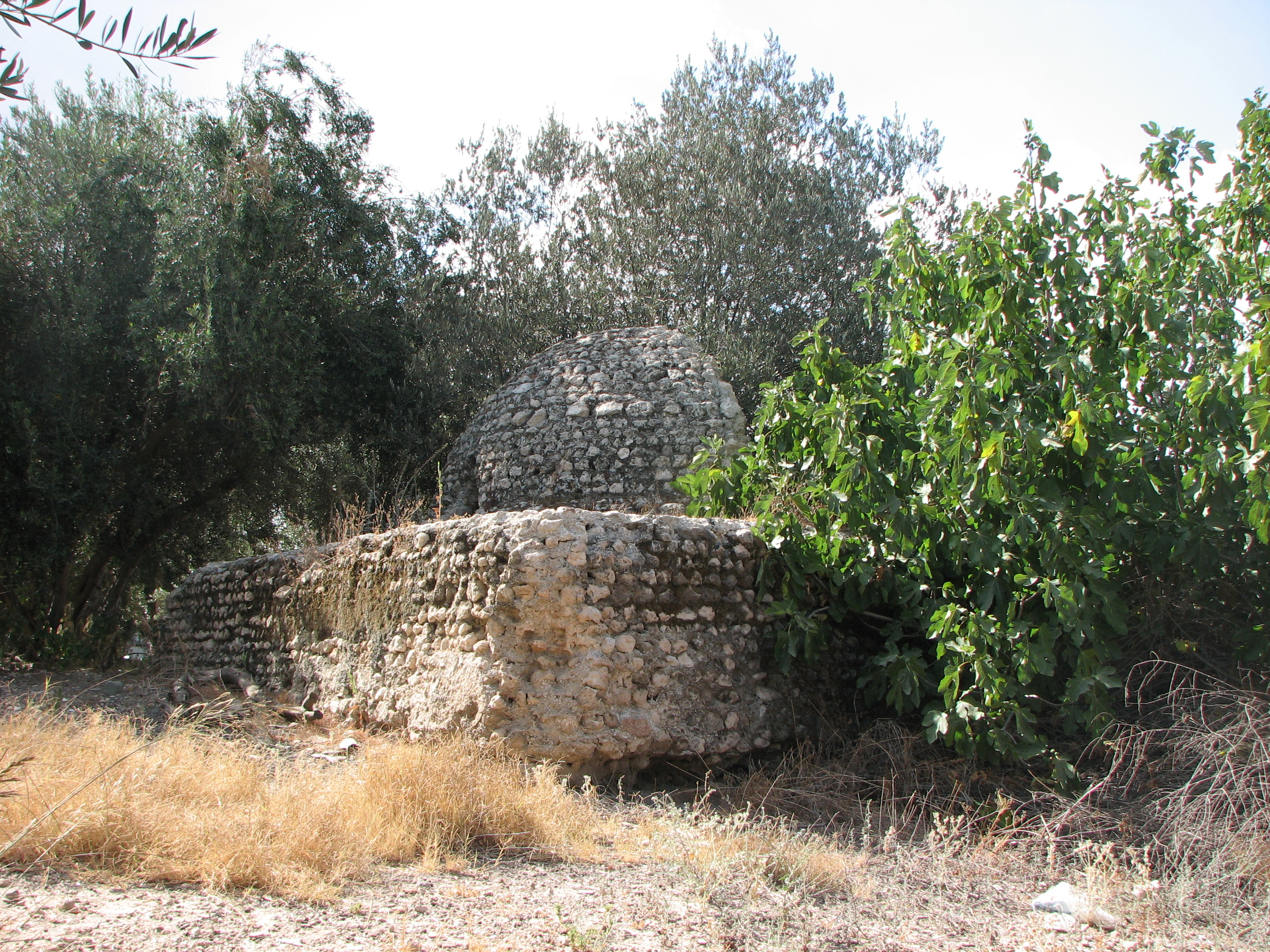
- Old structure from Bayt Daras, presently in Azrikam
- Etymology: "The house of treading corn"
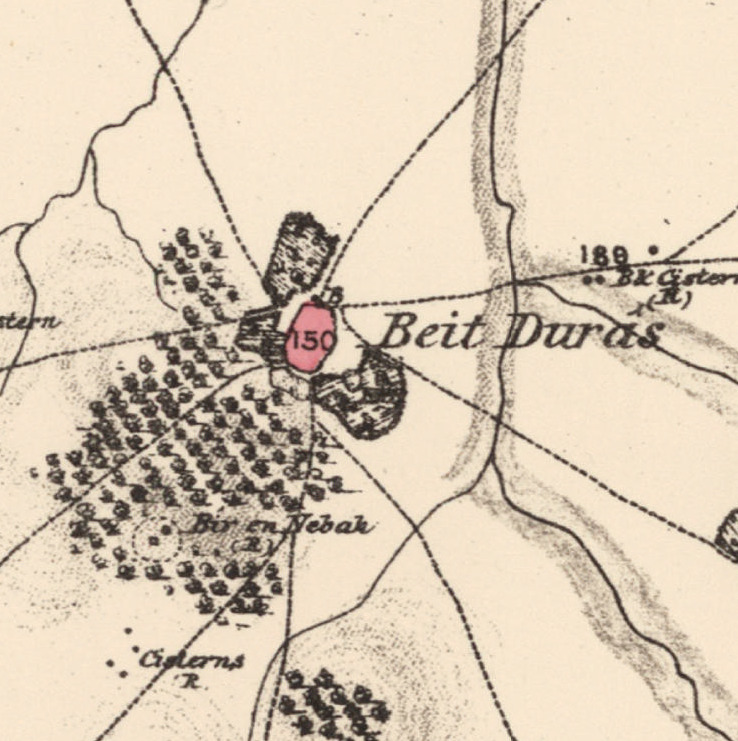
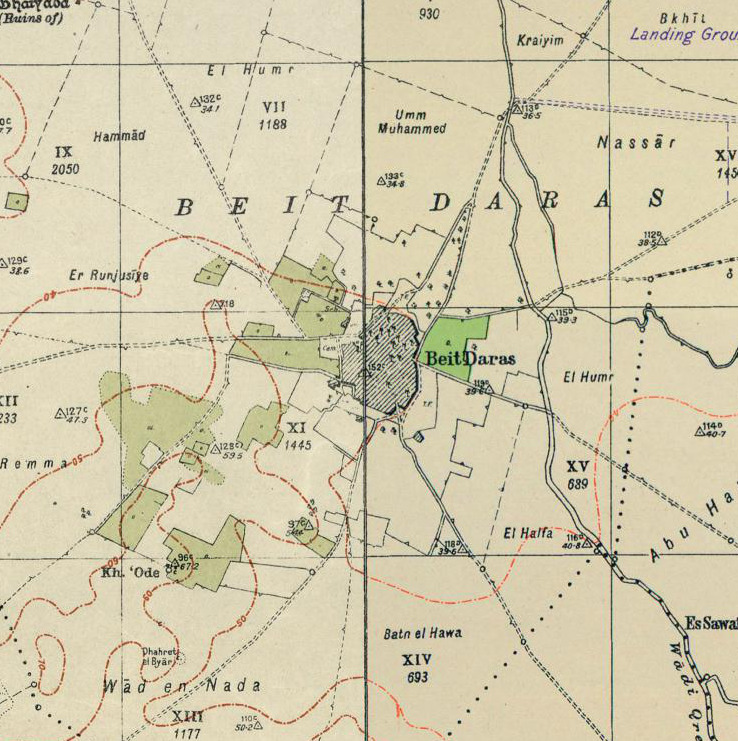
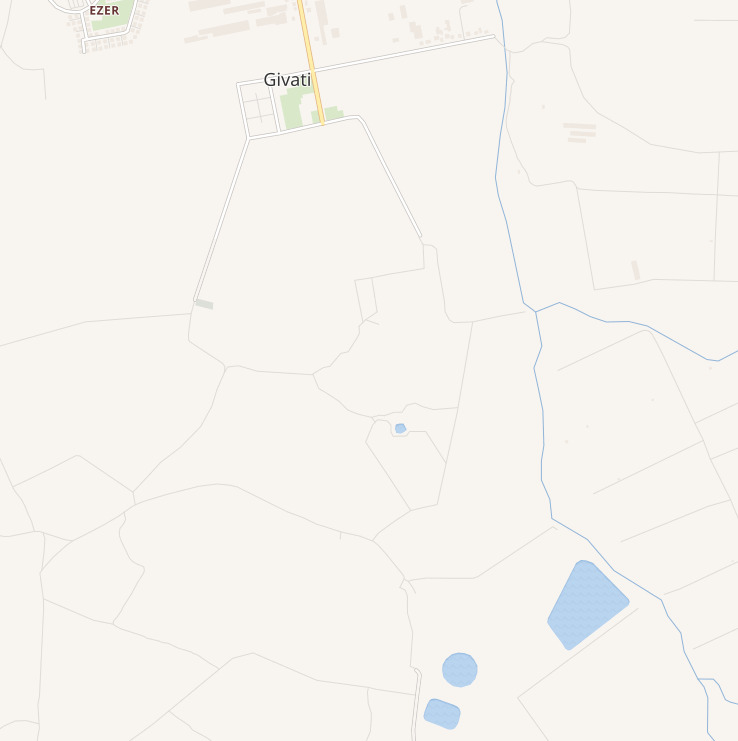
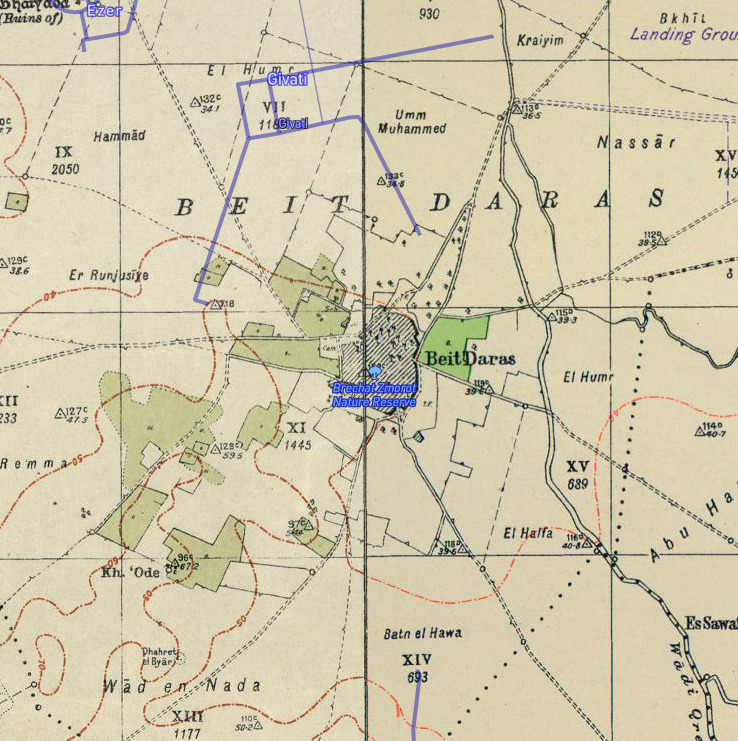
- 1870s map 1940s map modern map 1940s with modern overlay map A series of historical maps of the area around Bayt Daras (click the buttons)

- Location within Mandatory Palestine
- Coordinates: 31°43′24″N 34°40′58″E
- Palestine grid: 120/125
- Geopolitical entity: Mandatory Palestine
- Subdistrict: Gaza
- Date of depopulation: May 11, 1948

Area
  - Total: 16,357 dunams (16.357 km^{2}; 6.315 sq mi)

Population (1945)
  - Total: 2,750
- Cause(s) of depopulation: Military assault by Yishuv forces
- Current Localities: Giv'ati Emunim Azrikam

Bayt Daras (Arabic: بيت دراس) was a Palestinian Arab town located 46 kilometers (29 mi) northeast of Gaza and approximately 50 meters (160 ft) above sea level. The village was depopulated and destroyed during the 1948 Palestine war, as part of the 1948 Palestinian expulsion and the Nakba.

== History ==
A grave, dating to the Hellenistic era, probably from the first half of the third century BCE, have been found and excavated at the site.

Bayt Daras was an archaeological site that contained stone foundations and vaulted rooms. The Crusaders built a castle on the hill that overlooked the village. Church endowments and land deeds mention it as Betheras. During the Mamluk rule in Palestine, (1205–1517), Bayt Daras formed part of a mail route from Cairo to Damascus. In this period, in 1325, a khan, or caravanserai, was built in the village.

Bayt Daras was one of twin villages carrying this name, inhabited in the 15th century. In 1459, Mamluk records mention Bayt Daras al-Surgha (Lesser Bayt Daras)'s endowment as a waqf.

=== Ottoman Empire ===
In 1517, Bayt Daras was incorporated into the Ottoman Empire with the rest of Palestine. In first Ottoman tax register of 1526/7 the village had a population of 22 Muslim households, and it belonged to the nahiya (subdistrict) of Gaza (Gaza Sanjak). In 1596 the village also appeared as being in the nahiya of Gaza under the Liwa of Gaza, with a population of 58 Muslim households; an estimated 319 persons. It paid a fixed tax rate of 33.3% on a number of crops, including wheat and barley, as well as on goats, beehives and vineyards; a total of 7,900 akçe. 1/24 of the revenue went to a waqf.

During the 17th and 18th centuries, the area of Bayt Daras experienced a significant process of settlement decline due to nomadic pressures on local communities. The residents of abandoned villages moved to surviving settlements, but the land continued to be cultivated by neighboring villages.

In 1838, Beit Daras was noted as a Muslim village in the Gaza district.

French explorer Victor Guérin visited the village in 1863, and found it to have 700 inhabitants. In the 1882 PEF's Survey of Western Palestine (SWP), the village of Bayt Daras was described as being surrounded by gardens and olive groves, and it was bordered to the north by a pond.

=== British Mandate ===
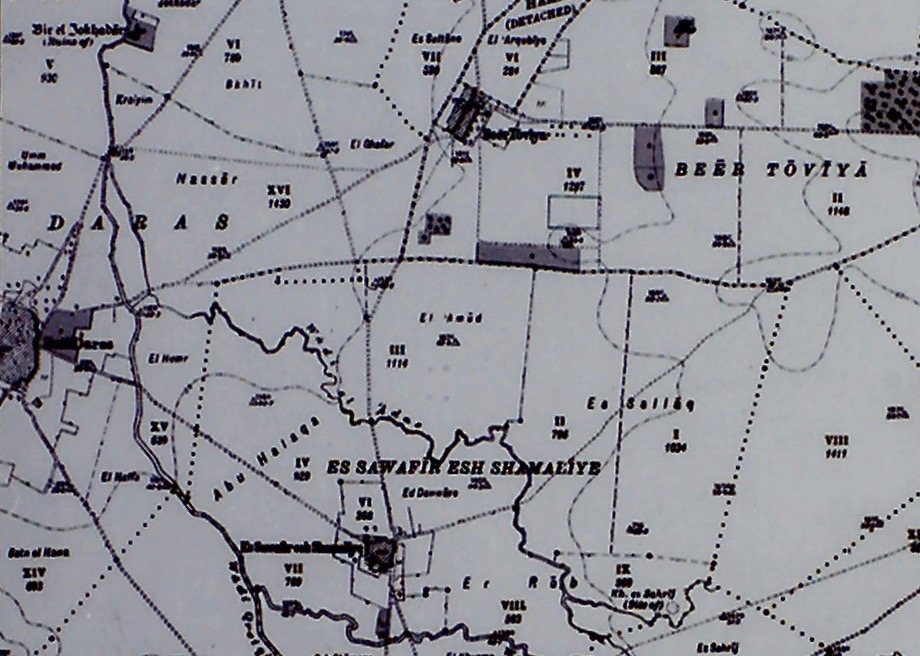
Bayt Daras 1930 1:20,000 (left of map)

In the 1922 census of Palestine, conducted by the British Mandate authorities, Bait Daras had a population of 1,670 Muslims, increasing in the 1931 census of Palestine, to 1,804, still all Muslim, in 401 inhabited houses.

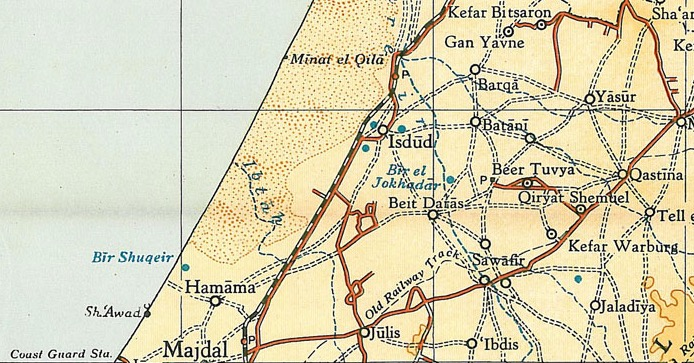
Bayt Daras 1945 1:250,000

In the 1945 statistics Beit Daras had a population of 2,750 Muslims, with 16,357 dunams of land, according to an official land and population survey. Of this, 832 dunams were allocated to citrus and banana plants, 472 plantations and irrigable land, 14,436 used for cereals, while 88 dunams were built-up land. One quarter of the land was owned by a single family, one of whose survivors still has their title deeds in her keeping in a Khan Younis refugee camp. A school was established there in 1921 and in its first year had 234 students enrolled, taught by 5 teachers in six classes.

In addition to agriculture, residents practiced animal husbandry which formed was an important source of income for the town. In 1943, they owned 653 heads of cattle, 489 sheep over a year old, 103 goats over a year old, 35 camels, 10 horses, 18 mules, 299 donkeys, 6307 fowls, 2454 pigeons, and 23 pigs.

=== 1948 war and destruction ===
According to Palestinian accounts, Beit Daras villagers lived peacefully with residents of Tabiyya, a walled kubaniya (Jewish colony) on its borders. Jews brought their produce, spoke the dialect fluently and their local doctor, Tsemeh, would care for Beit Daras' sick people when called on for assistance. The only anomaly was the occasional sound of gunfire practice in Tabiyya which soldiers from the British army appeared to be training their neighbours in the use of arms. Occasionally British soldiers on horseback made harassing forays into Beit Daras.

According to Ramzy Baroud, Beit Daras began to be subjected to heavy shelling on March 27–28, 1948, during which nine villagers died and much of the crops were destroyed.

The village was subject to an Israeli offensive military assault four times. It was defended by the Sudanese Army and a number of local militiamen and, The objective of the Palmach's operational plan, 'Operation Lightning' (Mivtza Barak) was to compel the Arab inhabitants of the area to 'move' and by striking one or more population centres to cause an exodus, which was foreseen given the wave of panic that was sweeping Arab communities after the Deir Yassin massacre. Bayt Daras was targeted to be surrounded, to have the villagers surrender and hand over their arms, and if this order was resisted, it was to be mortared, stormed and 'dealt with in the manner of scorched earth'.

The village was attacked and captured on May 11, 1948 by the Givati Brigade during Operation Barak, just prior to the outbreak of the 1948 Arab–Israeli War. The village suffered some 50 casualties, and many houses were then blown up, and wells and granaries sabotaged. Bayt Daras had a population of 3,190 living in 709 houses in 1948. In Baroud's account, a massacre took place as people fled the village.

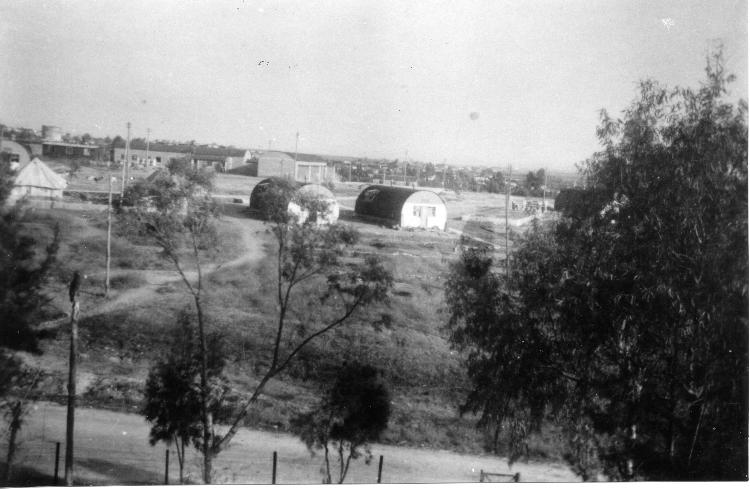
Israeli army camp at Bayt Daras, 1948

According to the memoirs of Gamal Abdel Nasser, the empty village was reoccupied by Sudanese forces in June, but they left after a signaling error caused them to be shelled by their own side.

Structures in the village were made of stone foundations with vaulted rooms. There were also two elementary schools and two mosques, all of which were demolished after its capture.

Following the war the area was incorporated into the State of Israel. In 1950 the moshav of Giv'ati was built on the site of the village, with two other moshavim, Azrikam, Emunim, established on land that had belonged to Bayt Daras. Later in the 1950s a farm called Zemorot was built on Khirbat Awda, which had also belonged to Bayt Daras.

In 1992 the village site was described: "The only remain of village buildings are the foundations of one house and some scattered rubble. The site is overgrown with wild vegetation interspersed by cactuses and eucalyptus trees. At least one of the streets is clearly recognisable. The surrounding fields are cultivated by the settlements."

== Culture ==
A woman's thob (loose fitting robe with sleeves) dated to about 1930 from the village of Beit Daras is part of the Museum of International Folk Art (MOIFA) collection at Santa Fe. The dress fabric is called abu hizz ahmar (black cotton ground with purple, orange and green stipes of cotton and silk), from Majdal. The only embroidery on the front is below the neck opening. The back panel has three horizontal bands of embroidery, and a local version of the khem-el-basha ("the pashas tent") motif along the hem.

== Palestinians with roots in Bayt Daras ==
- Ramzy Baroud
- Abdallah Tayeh, a Palestinian writer and novelist, author of Moon in Beit Daras (2001).

== See also ==
- Depopulated Palestinian locations in Israel
- Abdul Rahman Ahmed Jibril Baroud
- Mohammed Assaf

== Bibliography ==
- Ageel, Ghada (18 May 2013). "My Body in Shatat, My Heart in Gaza, My Soul in Beit Daras". The Palestine Chronicle.
- Ageel, Ghada (2016). "Beit Daras: Once upon a land". In Ageel, Ghada (ed.). Apartheid in Palestine:Hard Laws and Harder Experiences. University of Alberta Press. pp. 3–22. ISBN 978-1-772-12103-2.
- Baroud, Ramzy (2010). My Father Was a Freedom Fighter: Gaza's Untold Story. Pluto Press. ISBN 978-0-745-32882-9.
- Baroud, Ramzy (23 April 2013). "A Hundred Deir Yassin And Counting: Beit Daras And The Buried History of Massacres". Countercurrents.org.
- Barron, J.B., ed. (1923). Palestine: Report and General Abstracts of the Census of 1922. Government of Palestine.
- Conder, C.R.; Kitchener, H.H. (1882). The Survey of Western Palestine: Memoirs of the Topography, Orography, Hydrography, and Archaeology. Vol. 2. London: Committee of the Palestine Exploration Fund.
- Eisenberg-Degen, Davida; Emil Aladjem & Svetlana Talis (2019-06-06). "'Azriqam, Giv'ati Pumping Station". Hadashot Arkheologiyot – Excavations and Surveys in Israel (131). doi:10.69704/jhaesi.116.2004.25552.
- Ellenblum, R. (2003). Frankish Rural Settlement in the Latin Kingdom of Jerusalem. Cambridge University Press. ISBN 9780521521871.
- Government of Palestine, Department of Statistics (1945). Village Statistics, April, 1945.
- Guérin, V. (1869). Description Géographique Historique et Archéologique de la Palestine (in French). Vol. 1: Judee, pt. 2. Paris: L'Imprimerie Nationale.
- Hadawi, S. (1970). Village Statistics of 1945: A Classification of Land and Area ownership in Palestine. Palestine Liberation Organization Research Center.
- Hütteroth, W.-D.; Abdulfattah, K. (1977). Historical Geography of Palestine, Transjordan and Southern Syria in the Late 16th Century. Erlanger Geographische Arbeiten, Sonderband 5. Erlangen, Germany: Vorstand der Fränkischen Geographischen Gesellschaft. ISBN 3-920405-41-2.
- Khalidi, W. (1992). All That Remains: The Palestinian Villages Occupied and Depopulated by Israel in 1948. Washington D.C.: Institute for Palestine Studies. ISBN 0-88728-224-5.
- Mills, E., ed. (1932). Census of Palestine 1931. Population of Villages, Towns and Administrative Areas. Jerusalem: Government of Palestine.
- Morris, B. (2004). The Birth of the Palestinian Refugee Problem Revisited. Cambridge University Press. ISBN 978-0-521-00967-6.
- Nasser, G.A. (1955/1973): "Memoirs" in Journal of Palestine Studies
  - “Nasser's Memoirs of the First Palestine War” in 2, no. 2 (Win. 73): 3–32, pdf-file, downloadable
- Palmer, E.H. (1881). The Survey of Western Palestine: Arabic and English Name Lists Collected During the Survey by Lieutenants Conder and Kitchener, R. E. Transliterated and Explained by E.H. Palmer. Committee of the Palestine Exploration Fund.
- Robinson, E.; Smith, E. (1841). Biblical Researches in Palestine, Mount Sinai and Arabia Petraea: A Journal of Travels in the year 1838. Vol. 2. Boston: Crocker & Brewster.
- Robinson, E.; Smith, E. (1841). Biblical Researches in Palestine, Mount Sinai and Arabia Petraea: A Journal of Travels in the year 1838. Vol. 3. Boston: Crocker & Brewster.
- Röhricht, R. (1893). (RRH) Regesta regni Hierosolymitani (MXCVII-MCCXCI) (in Latin). Berlin: Libraria Academica Wageriana.
- Sharon, M. (1999). Corpus Inscriptionum Arabicarum Palaestinae, B-C. Vol. 2. BRILL. ISBN 90-04-11083-6.
- Stillman, Yedida Kalfon (1979): Palestinian costume and jewelry, Albuquerque: University of New Mexico Press, ISBN 0-8263-0490-7 (A catalog of the Museum of International Folk Art (MOIFA) at Santa Fe's collection of Palestinian clothing and jewelry.)
