= Al-'Azi =

Village in southern Israel

Al-'Azi: אל עזי (Hebrew); العازي (Arabic)
- Village

Hebrew transcription(s)
  - Official: al-Azy
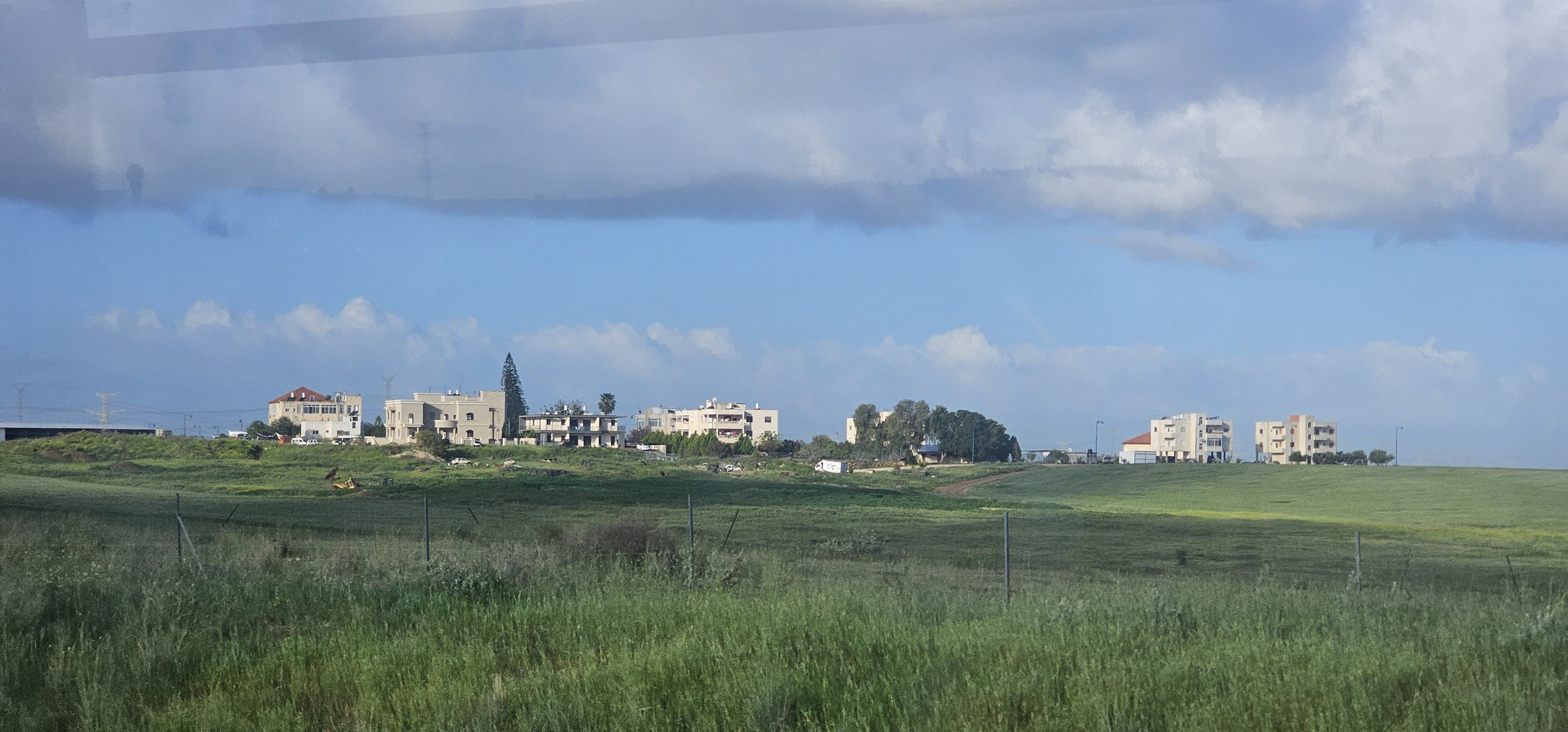
- Al-'Azi as seen from Highway 6

- Location within Ashkelon region of Israel Location within Israel
- Coordinates: 31°43′05″N 34°48′51″E
- Country: Israel
- District: Southern
- Subdistrict: Ashkelon
- Council: Yoav
- Population (2024): 192

Al-'Azi (Arabic: العازي, Hebrew: אל עזי) is an Arab village in central Israel. Located just south of Kfar Menahem, it falls under the jurisdiction of Yoav Regional Council. In 2024, it had a population of 192.

== History ==
Al-'Azi was officially recognized in 2003 but existed long before then. The Trans-Israel Highway was built on land owned by the village, with the village given land owned by neighbouring kibbutz Kfar Menahem as compensation.

== See also ==
- Arab localities in Israel
