= Bnei Ayish =

Bnei Ayish: בְּנֵי עַיִ"שׁ; بني عايش
- Local council (from 1981)

Hebrew transcription(s)
  - ISO 259: Bnei ʕayš
  - Also spelled: Bene Ayish (official)
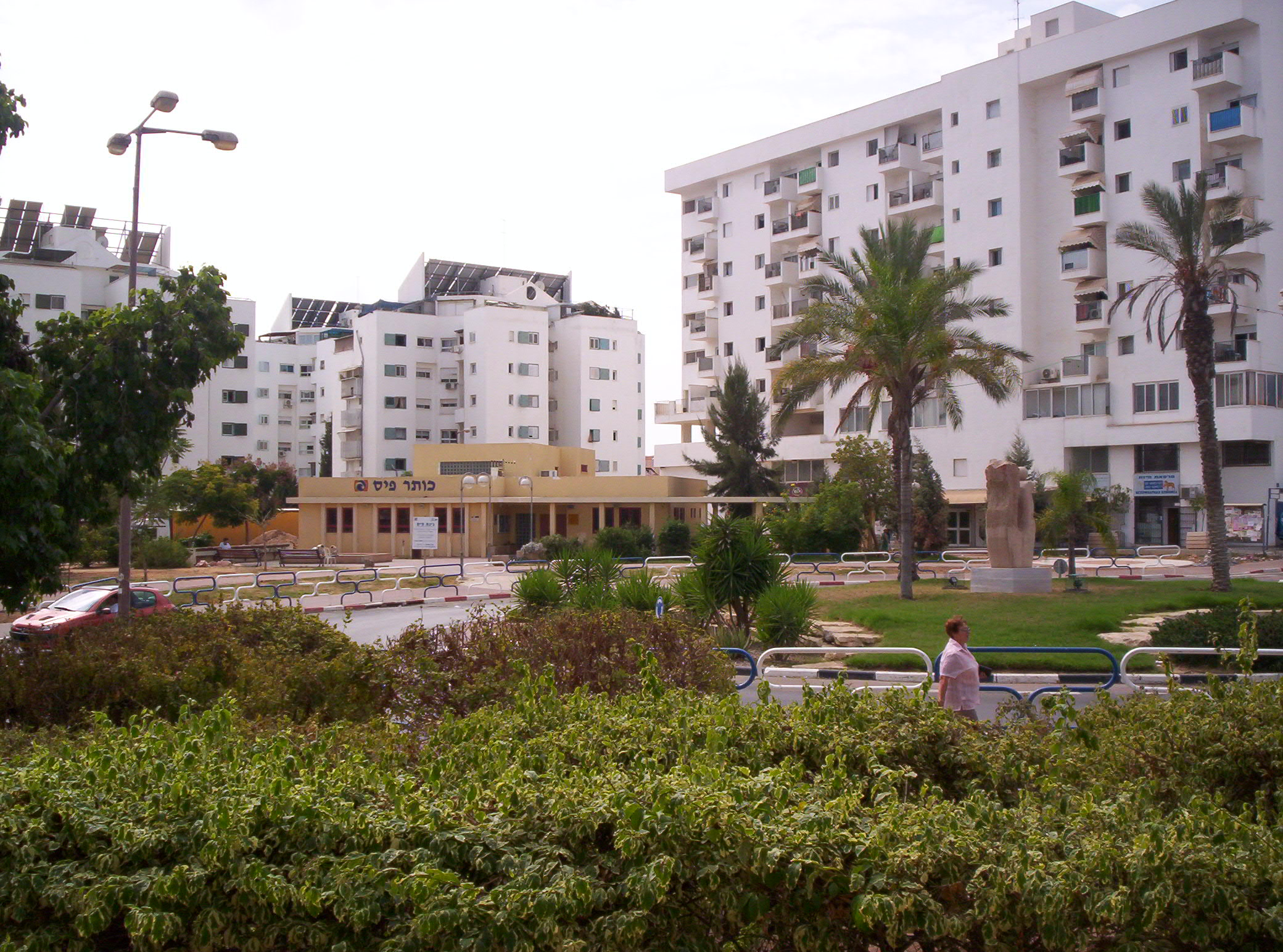

- Location within Central Israel
- Coordinates: 31°47′18.94″N 34°45′39.29″E
- Country: Israel
- District: Central
- Subdistrict: Rehovot
- Natural Region: Rehovot
- Founded: 7 October 1957

Government
  - Head of Municipality: Aryeh Garela

Area
  - Total: 836 dunams (83.6 ha; 207 acres)

Population (2024)
  - Total: 6,579
  - Density: 7,870/km^{2} (20,400/sq mi)
- Name meaning: Sons of Akiva Yosef Schlezinger

Bnei Ayish (Hebrew: בְּנֵי עַיִ"שׁ) is a town and local council in the Central District of Israel. Located around ten kilometers from Ashdod and adjacent to Gedera, it had a population of 6,579 in 2024.

== History ==
The town was founded in 1957. Before 1948, the area had served as a military base for British Army troops during the Mandate era. It was named after Rabbi Akiva Yosef Schlezinger, whose name is abbreviated to Ayish.

Bnei Ayish originally served as a transit camp for immigrants from Yemen in the early 1950s. Today its population is almost entirely made up of Jews of Yemenite descent and immigrants from the former Soviet Union.

== Voting Patterns ==
In the 2022 election, 57 percent of voters in Bnei Ayish voted for the parties of the right-wing coalition led by Benjamin Netanyahu, while 40 percent voted for the parties of the center-left coalition led by Yair Lapid and 0.1 percent voted for the Arab parties.

In the 2026 election, 54 percent of voters in Bnei Ayish voted for the parties of the right-wing coalition led by Benjamin Netanyahu, while 40 percent voted for the parties of the center-left coalition led by Gadi Eisenkot and 0.1 percent voted for the Arab parties. An additional 3.4 percent voted for the Reservists, and 1.8 percent voted for Amcha Yisrael. Voter turnout increased 7 percent from the 2022 election.
