= Moshavim Movement =

Jewish agricultural cooperative movement

The Moshavim Movement (Hebrew: תנועת המושבים, Tnu'at HaMoshavim) is one of the main settlement movements in Israel, whose members are cooperative villages organized as moshavim and moshavim shitufiim.

== History ==
Founded in 1920 with the establishment of the first moshav, Nahalal, in the Jezreel Valley in the north of Israel, the movement today has a membership of 253 moshavim from the total of 440 moshavim and moshavim shitufiim in Israel.

The member moshavim have access to a range of mutual help instruments maintained by the Moshavim Movement. These include a mutual insurance company, a mutual help fund, a mortgage bank for moshavim, and a pension and retirement fund for individual moshav members. In the past, the Moshavim Movement created a system of regional service cooperatives (mif'alim ezoriim in Hebrew) for supply of farm inputs and for marketing and processing of farm products for its members. These regional cooperatives were essentially similar to those established by the Kibbutz Movement for kibbutzim and included fruit packing and canning facilities, livestock feed mixing centers, poultry and meat processing plants, egg sorting and packing facilities, and refrigerated storage capacities.

The Moshavim Movement, like all settlement movements in Israel, is a secondary cooperative or a cooperative federation whose members are primary village-level agricultural cooperatives (moshavim and moshavim shitufiim).
