= List of junctions and interchanges in Israel =

This is a list of named junctions (Hebrew: צומת, tsomet) and interchanges (Hebrew: מחלף, mechlaf) in Israel in alphabetical order. Intersecting road numbers and/or road names are given in brackets. Alternative names by which junctions are known are also in brackets.

== Junctions ==
=== A ===
- Abba Hillel Silver Junction (3, 4)
- Achihud Junction (70, 85)
- Ada Junction (652, 653)
- Adashim Junction (60, 73)
- Adi Junction (79, local road)
- Adumim Junction (1, 458)
- Afik Junction (98, 789)
- Akko East Junction (4, 85)
- Akko North Junction (8510, Golani Brigade Rd., Akko)
- Akko South Junction (8510, Yehonatan HeHashmona'i St., Akko)
- Almog Junction (1, local road)
- Alon Junction (65, 650)
- Alonim Junction (75, 7513)
- Alumot Junction (767, 768)
- Ami'ad Junction (85, 90)
- Ar'ara BaNegev Junction (25, 80)
- Ariel Junction (5, 505, 4775)
- Atarot Junction (45, 50)
- Avital Junction (91, 9881)
- Azekah Junction (38, 383)

=== B ===
- Bareket Junction (40, 46, 453)
- Bar'on Junction (98, 959)
- Baruch Junction (73, 7255)
- Bashan Junction (87, 98)
- Bedek Junction (40, 4613)
- Be'erotayim Junction (57, 5704)
- Beit Aryeh Junction (446, 465, local road)
- Beit Dagan Junction (44, 412)
- Beit HaArava Junction (1, 90)
- Beit HaMeches Junction (91, 888)
- Beit Horon Junction (443, local roads)
- Beit Rimon Junction (77, 754)
- Beit Tsaida Junction (87, 888)
- Beka'ot Junction (57, 578)
- Bental Junction (959, local road)
- Betset Junction (4, 899)
- Bi'ina Junction (85, 8534)
- Bik'at Timna Junction (name of two different junctions on Highway 90 with local roads)
- Binyamina Junction (4, 653)
- Bnei Darom Junction (41, 42)

=== C ===
- Chabad Junction (44, 4402)

=== D ===
- Daliyot Junction (808, 869)
- Damun Junction (672, 721)
- Deir Hanna Junction (805, 806)
- Dimona Junction (25, 204)
- Dotan Junction (60, 585)
- Dror Junction (4, 553)
- Dvira Junction (6, 325)

=== E ===
- Eilabun Junction (65, 806)
- Ein Afek Junction (4, 7911)
- Ein HaKore Junction (42, 431)
- Ein HaMifrats Junction (4, 8510)
- Ein Hatsva Junction (90, 227)
- Ein Zeitim Junction (89, 886)
- El-Al Junction (40, 46, 453)
- El-Rom Junction (98, 9799)
- Elyakhin Junction (581, 5812)
- Eshkolot Junction (4, 232)
- Eshta'ol Junction (38, 395)
- Evlayim Junction (70, 781)
- Eyal Junction (444, 551)
- Ezka Junction (38, 383)

=== F ===
- Fureidis Junction (4, 70)

=== G ===
- Gadot Junction (91, 918)
- Gama Junction (232, 242)
- Ganim Junction (40, 483)
- Gazit Junction (65, 7276)
- Gedera Junction (7, 40)
- Ginaton Junction (40, 443)
- Gitai Junction (5, 505)
- Giv'at Ko'ah Junction (444, 465)
- Giv'at Yeruham Junction (204, 224)
- Giv'at Ze'ev Junction (45, 436, 443)
- Giv'onim Junction (436, local road)
- Golomb Junction (50, Golomb St. in Jerusalem)
- Gome Junction (90, 977)
- Gonen Junction (918, 959)
- Gov Ga'ash Junction (Sakhikh Junction) (978, 9799)
- Gush Etzion Junction (60, 367)

=== H ===
- HaAmakim Junction (Jalame Junction) (70, 75)
- HaArava Junction (25, 90)
- Hadasim Junction (4, local road)
- Hadera Junction (4, Shim'oni St., Hadera)
- Hadera East Junction (65, local road)
- HaDo'ar Junction (463, local road)
- HaEmir Junction ("West" Junction) (959, 978)
- HaGdi Junction (34, 293)
- Halafta Junction (85, 806)
- HaLohem HaBedu'i Junction (77, local road)
- Halukim Junction (40, 204)
- HaMapalim Junction (87, 808)
- Hamat Gader Junction (98, 7599)
- HaMaskit (57, 557)
- HaMetsudot Junction (90, 99)
- HaMovil Junction (77, 79)
- Hamra Junction (57, 508)
- Hananya Junction (Sheva Junction) (85, 866)
- HaNatsiv Junction (90, 6678)
- HaNegev Junction (40, 211)
- Hanita Junction (899, 8990)
- Hanna Junction (65, 652)
- HaNokdim Junction (Ohalim Junction) (40, 406)
- HaOgen Junction (4, 5700)
- Har Eitan Junction (395, 3965)
- Har Harif Junction (10, 171)
- Harish Junction (574, 6353)
- HaRo'e Junction (4, 581)
- HaRuhot Junction (40, 171)
- HaSargel Junction (65, 675)
- HaSharon Junction (Beit Lid) (4, 57)
- HaShayara Junction (70, local road)
- HaShiryon Junction (Nefah Junction) (91, 978)
- HaShoftim Junction (4, Jerusalem Blvd., Goshen Blvd., Kiryat Motzkin/Kiryat Bialik)
- HaShomrim Junction (75, 722)
- Hassidim Junction (70, 762)
- HaTishbi Junction (66, 70, 722)
- Hatrurim Junction (31, 258)
- HeAsor Junction (4, Ben Gurion Blvd., Weizmann Blvd., Kiryat Motzkin/Kiryat Bialik)
- Hefer Junction (4, 5720)
- Hilazon Junction (804, 805)
- Hiram Junction (89, 899)
- Holot Interchange (4, 20)
- Horshat Tal Junction (99, 918)
- Horshim Junction (444, 5233)
- Hosen Junction (89, 864)
- Hulda Junction (3, 411)

=== I ===
- Immanuel Junction (55, 5066)
- Iron Junction (Mishmar HaGvul Junction) (65, 574)
- Issachar Junction (71, 716)

=== J ===
- Julis Junction (70, 8533)

=== K ===
- Kabri Junction (70, 89)
- Kadarim Junction (Nahal Amud Junction) (65, 85)
- Kaf Het Junction (Koah Junction) (90, 899)
- Kalaniyot Junction (574, 581)
- Karmiel Junction (85, Nesi'ei Israel Blvd., Karmiel)
- Karmiel West Junction (85, 784)
- Katsrin North Junction (9088, 9098)
- Katsrin South Junction (87, 9088)
- Kerem Junction (386, 395)
- Keshet Junction (87, oil pipeline road)
- Kfar Masaryk Junction (4, local road)
- Kfar Nahum Junction (87, 90)
- Kfar Saba East Junction (55, 5504)
- Kfar Tavor Junction (56, 767)
- Kineret Junction (90, 767)
- Kiryat Chaim Junction (HaTsrif) (4, 781)
- Kishon Junction (4, 75)
- Kisufim Junction (242, 2410)
- Kochav HaYarden Junction (90, 717)
- Koranit Junction (784, 7933)
- Korazim Junction (90, 8277)
- Ktura Junction (40, 90)

=== L ===
- Lehavot HaBashan Junction (918, 977)

=== M ===
- Ma'agan Junction (92, 98)
- Ma'ale Efrayim Junction (505, 508)
- Ma'ale Gamla Junction (92, 869)
- Ma'asiyahu Junction (44, 434)
- Maccabim Junction (443, 4466)
- Maccabim-Re'ut Junction (443, Yair Pereg St., Modi'in-Maccabim-Re'ut)
- Mahanayim Junction (90, 91)
- Magshimim Junction (98, 808, local road)
- Mal'akhi Junction (Qastina) (3, 40)
- Ma'on Junction (232, 241)
- Mas'ada Junction (98, 99)
- Mash'abim Junction (40, 211)
- Masua Junction (90, local road)
- Megiddo Junction (65, 66)
- Mehola Junction (90, 578)
- Mei Ami Junction (65, 6535)
- Mekhora Junction (57, local road)
- Meron Junction (89, 866)
- Metzer Junction (574, 5923)
- Migdal Junction (90, 807)
- Migdal Afek Junction (444, 471)
- Misgav Junction (784, 805)
- Mishmar HaGvul Junction (Iron Junction) (65, 574)
- Mivtahim Junction (232, 2310)
- Mivtsa Horev Junction (10, 211)
- Modi'im Junction (443, 444, 4314)
- Moreshet Junction (781, 784)
- Mughar Junction (806, 807)

=== N ===
- Nahal Amud Junction (Kadarim Junction) (65, 85)
- Nahal Hadera Junction (4, 65)
- Nahal Tsalmon North Junction (65, 807)
- Nahal Tsalmon South Junction (65, 807)
- Nahalal Junction (73, 75)
- Nahariya Junction (4, 89)
- Nahshon Junction (3, 44)
- Nashut Junction (91, 9088)
- Navot Junction (71, 675)
- Nazareth North Junction (75, 754)
- Nazareth South Junction (60, 75)
- Nefah Junction (HaShiryon Junction) (91, 978)
- Nes Harim Junction (386, 3866)
- Nesher Junction (705, 752)
- Netivot Junction (25, 34)
- Netofa Junction (65, 785)
- Nirbata Junction (574, 6403)
- Nir Tzvi Junction (44, 4313)
- Nitzanei Oz Junction (57, 5714)
- Nvalt Junction (444, 453)

=== O ===
- Odem Junction (57, 90)
- Ofarim Junction (446, 465)
- Ofer Junction (4, 7021)
- Ohalim Junction (HaNokdim Junction) (40, 406)
- Or Akiva Junction (4, 6511)
- Orha Junction (98, local road)
- Oren Junction (4, 721)

=== P ===
- Pal-Yam Junction (4, 651)
- Pardesiya Junction (4, 5613)
- Peres Junction (local roads, Golan Heights)
- Poran Junction (959, 9881)
- Poriya Junction (77, 768)
- Ptza'el Junction (90, 505)

=== R ===
- Ra'anana Junction (4, 541)
- Rafid Junction (local roads, Golan Heights)
- Rama Junction (85, 804)
- Re'em Junction (Masmiyya) (3, 40)
- Re'im Junction (232, local road)
- Rimonim Junction (449, 458)
- Rosh HaAyin Junction (444, 483)
- Rosh Pinna Junction (90, 8677)
- Rotem Junction (25, 206)
- Ruppin Junction (4, 5711)

=== S ===
- Sakhikh Junction (Gov Ga'ash Junction) (978, 9799)
- Samach Junction (Kursi Junction) (92, 789)
- Samaria Junction (60, local PA road)
- Sayarim Junction (10, 12)
- Segula Junction (40, 481, HaNahal St., Petah Tikva)
- Sha'ar Efrayim Junction (557, local road)
- Sha'ar HaNegev Junction (34, 232; Sderot)
- Sha'ar Hefer Junction (57, 5700)
- Sha'ariya Junction (40, 471)
- She'an Junction (71, 90)
- Sheva Junction (Hananya Junction) (85, 866)
- Shfar'am Junction (79, 311; Shefa-'Amr)
- Shifon Junction (91, 9099)
- Shilat Junction (443, 446)
- Shimshon Junction (38, 44)
- Shi'on Junction (99, 999)
- Shivta Junction (211, local road)
- Shizafon Junction (12, 40)
- Shluhot Junction (90, 669)
- Shomeret Junction (4, 8510)
- Sirkin Junction (40, 4730)
- Somekh Junction (70, 79)

=== T ===
- Talmon-Dolev Junction (450, 463)
- Tapu'ah Junction (60, 505)
- Tavor Junction (65, 7266)
- Tayasim Junction (40, 461)
- Tefen Junction (89, 854)
- Tel Akko Junction (85, 8510)
- Tel Eshtori Junction (71, 7079)
- Tira Junction (444, 554)
- Tlalim Junction (40, 211)
- Tze'elim Junction (40, 224)
- Tzemach Junction (90, 98)
- Tzihor Junction (13, 40)
- Tziporim Junction (40, local road)
- Tzrifin Junction (44, local road)
- Tzur Hadassa Junction (375, 386)
- Tzur Natan Junction (444, 5533)
- Umm al-Fahm Junction (65, local road)

=== U ===
- Urim Junction (234, 241)

=== V ===
- Vulcan Junction (4, local road)

=== W ===
- "West" Junction (HaEmir Junction) (959, 978)

=== Y ===
- Ya'ar Odem Junction (98, 978)
- Yad Mordechai Junction (4, 34)
- Yagur Junction (70, 75, 752)
- Yakir Gadol Junction (505, local road)
- Yanuv Junction (57, 5613)
- Yasif Junction (70, 85)
- Yavor Junction (70, 805)
- Yehudiya Junction (87, 92)
- Yeruham Junction (204, 225)
- Yesha Junction (886, 899)
- Yesod HaMa'ala Junction (90, 9119)
- Yiftach'el Junction (79, 784)
- Yishai Junction (75, 77)
- Yizra'el Junction (60, 675)
- Yodefet Junction (784, 7955)
- Yokne'am Junction (70, local road)
- Yuvalim Junction (784, 805)

=== Z ===
- Zemer Junction (574, 5714)
- Zikhron Ya'akov Junction (4, Nili Blvd., Zikhron Ya'akov)
- Zivan Junction (91, 98)
- Zohar Junction (21, 90)
- Zvulun Junction (70, 780)

== Interchanges ==
=== A ===
- Abba Hillel Interchange (482, Bialik St., Ramat Gan)
- Adumim Interchange (1, 417)
- Allenby Interchange (4, Allenby Rd., Haifa)
- Aluf Sadeh Interchange (4, Sheba Rd., Ramat Ef'al)
- Anava Interchange (1, 431)
- Ashdod Interchange (4, 7, 41)
- Atlit Interchange (2, 721, 7110)

=== B ===
- Bar Ilan Interchange (4, 471)
- Barkan Interchange (5, 4765)
- Baqa-Jat Interchange (6, 61)
- Batzra Interchange (4, local road)
- Beko'a Interchange (3, local road)
- Ben Gurion Interchange (1, 4503)
- Ben Shemen Interchange (1, 6, 443, 444)
- Benzion Netanyahu Interchange (50, Jerusalem Road 20)
- Beit Horon Interchange (443, Local road)
- Bialik North Interchange (22, Local road)
- Bruchin Interchange (5, 446)

=== C ===
- Caesarea Interchange (2, 65)

=== D ===
- Daniel Interchange (1, 6)
- Dov Hoz Interchange (20, Dov Hoz St. in Holon)
- Dov Yosef Interchange (u.c.) (50, Dov Yosef Blvd. in Jerusalem)

=== E ===
- Eilot Interchange (90, 109)
- Ein HaKore Interchange (42, 431)
- Elyakim Interchange (70, 672)
- Eyal Interchange (6, 551)

=== G ===
- Ganot Interchange (1, 4)
- Gan Rave Interchange (4, 42, HaHistadrut St., Rishon LeZion)
- Gdud 21 Interchange (4, HaHashmal St. in Haifa)
- Geha Interchange (4, 481)
- Gesher HaShalom Interchange (2, 5611)
- Gesher Paz Interchange (4, 22, HaHashmal St. in Haifa)
- Givat Mordechai (50, Shmuel Bait St. in Jerusalem)
- Givat Shaul Interchange (50, Givat Shaul St. in Jerusalem)
- Giv'at Shmu'el Interchange (4, Mivtza Kadesh St., Giv'at Shmu'el)
- Glilot Ma'arav Interchange (2, 5)
- Glilot Mizrah Interchange (5, 20)
- Golani Interchange (65, 77)
- Golda Meir Interchange (50, 436)

=== H ===
- Hadarim Interchange (4, 551)
- HaHalakha Interchange (20, Rabbi Shlomo Goren St., Tel Aviv)
- Haifa South Interchange (2, 4)
- HaKerayot Interchange (4, 752)
- HaKfar HaYarok Interchange (5, 482)
- HaMinharot Interchange (u.c.) (50, 60, Rosmarin St. in Jerusalem)
- HaRakevet Interchange (20, 481, Al Parashat Drakhim St, Tel Aviv)
- Har'el Interchange (1, 3985)
- HaShalom Interchange (20, Giv'at HaTahmoshet St., Tel Aviv)
- HaShiv'a Interchange (4, 44)
- HaSira Interchange (2, 541)
- Hativat HaNegev Interchange (40, 60; Beersheba, Omer)
- Havatselet Interchange (2, 5710)
- HaZeitim Interchange (1, El-Hardub str. in Jerusalem)
- Heil HaShiryon Interchange (2, 20, 461)
- Hemed Interchange (1, 3975)
- Hiram Interchange (4, 22)
- Hof HaSharon Interchange (2, local roads)
- Holon Interchange (20, 44, Levi Eshkol Blvd.)
- Holot Interchange (4, 20)
- Horshim Interchange (6, 531)

=== I ===
- Iron Interchange (6, 65)

=== K ===
- Kaplan Interchange (2, Kaplan St., Tel Aviv)
- Keren Kayemet Interchange (20, Keren Kayemet Blvd., Tel Aviv)
- Kfar Sava-Ra'anana North Interchange (4, Begin Blvd., Kfar Sava/Weitzmann St., Ra'anana)
- Kibbutz Galuyot Interchange (1, 20, 461)
- Kiryat Moshe Interchange (50, Yitzhak Rabin St. in Jerusalem)
- Komemiyut Interchange (20, Moshe Dayan St., Holon)

=== L ===
- LaGuardia Interchange (20, LaGuardia St., Tel Aviv)
- Latrun Interchange (1, 3)
- Lehavim Interchange (6, 40, 310)
- Lod Interchange (1, 40)

=== M ===
- Malha Interchange (u.c.) (50, local streets)
- Mesubim Interchange (4, 461)
- Mevo Ayalon Interchange (20, 431)
- Morasha Interchange (4, 5)
- Moshe Dayan Interchange (4, 441)
- Mota Gur Interchange (4, Halutzei HaTa'asiya St., Haifa)
- Motza Interchange (1, Sorek St. in Jerusalem)

=== N ===
- Nahshon-Neve Shalom Interchange (3, local road)
- Nahshonim Interchange (6, 471)
- Nesharim Interchange (6, 44, 431)
- Ness Ziona Interchange (412, 431)
- Netanya Interchange (2, 57)
- Nitzanei Oz Interchange (6, 57)

=== O ===
- Olga Interchange (2, Aaron Aaronsohn St. in Hadera)

=== P ===
- Poleg Interchange (2, 553)

=== Q ===
- Qassem Interchange (5, 6)

=== R ===
- Ra'anana Darom Interchange (4, 554)
- Rabin Interchange (Shmaryahu Interchange) (2, HaMa'apilim St., Kfar Shmaryahu)
- Ramla South Interchange (40, 431)
- Ramlod Interchange (40, 44)
- Rishonim Interchange (412, 431)
- Rishon LeZion Interchange (4, 441)
- Rishon South Interchange (4, 431)
- Rokach Interchange (20, Rokach Blvd., Tel Aviv)
- Rosh HaAyin Mizrah Interchange (5, 5050)

=== S ===
- Sha'ar HaGay Interchange (1, 38, 415)
- Sha'ar Mizrah Interchange (1, 60)
- Sha'ar Moriah Interchange (1, Ben Gurion Ave. in Jerusalem)
- Sha'ar Shomron Interchange (5, 505)
- Shapirim Interchange (1, 412)
- Sarah Interchange (40, 25; Beersheba, Segev Shalom)
- Shiv'at HaKokhavim Interchange (20, 541)
- Shoket Interchange
- Shoresh Interchange (1, 3955)
- Sorek Interchange (3, 7, 6)

=== T ===
- Tikva Interchange (5, Zevulun Hammer Rd., Petah Tikva)

=== W ===
- Wolffsohn Interchange (20, HaLohamim St., Tel Aviv-Yafo, Heinrich Heine St., Tel Aviv-Yafo)

=== Y ===
- Yanai Interchange (2, 5720)
- Yarkon Interchange (5, 40)
- Yavne Interchange (4, 4111)
- Yigael Yadin Interchange (1, 50, 436)
- Yitzhak Shamir Interchange (u.c.) (50, Golumb St. in Jerusalem)
- Yoseftal Interchange (20, Yoseftal blvd in Bat Yam)

=== Z ===
- Zikhron Ya'akov Interchange (2, 70)

== Railway junctions ==
- Level junctions
  - Afek Junction (Tel Aviv – Rosh HaAyin Line, Eastern Line)
  - Na'an Junction (Tel Aviv–Beersheba line, Tel Aviv – Beit Shemesh line)
  - Tel Baruch Junction (Tel Aviv–Haifa line, Tel Aviv–Rosh HaAyin Line)
  - Remez Junction (Tel Aviv–Haifa line, Eastern Line). To become flying junction in the future.
- Flying junctions
  - Lod Interchange (Tel Aviv–Modi'in/Jerusalem Line, Eastern Line).
  - Anava Interchange (Tel Aviv–Jerusalem Line, Modi'in branch)
  - Pleshet Junction (Rehovot–Ashdod line, Yavne West–Ashdod line, Port of Ashdod freight branch)
  - Shafirim Interchange (Tel Aviv–Lod line, Tel Aviv–Modi'in/Jerusalem line)

== See also ==
- List of highways in Israel
- Roads in Israel
- Transportation in Israel
- Trempiada
