= Railway to Beersheba =

Coordinates: 31°32′15.41″N 34°46′49.06″E

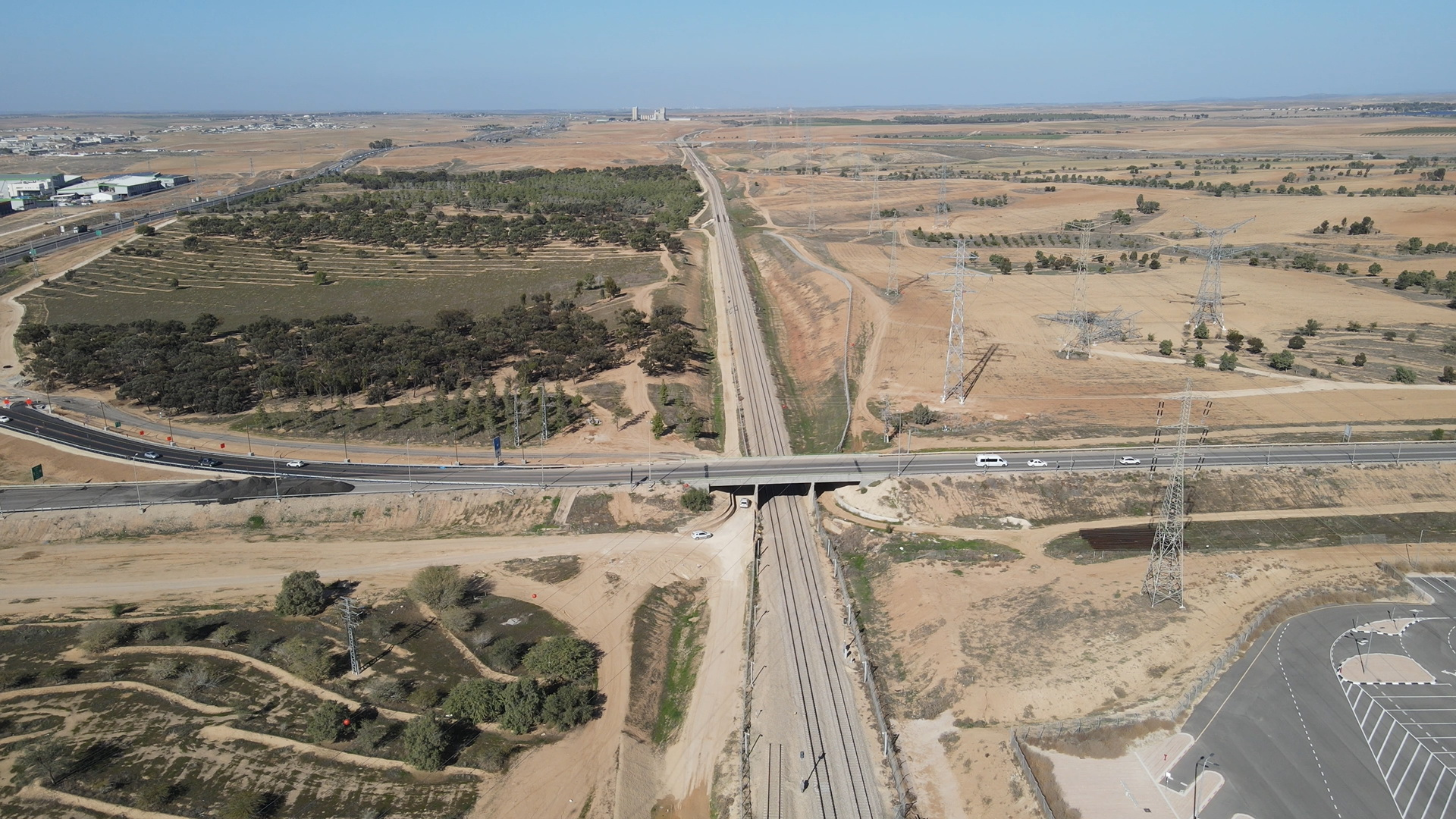
Railway to Beersheba

The Railway to Beersheba (Hebrew: מסילת הרכבת לבאר שבע, Mesilat HaRakevet LiV'er Sheva) is a railway line that runs from central Israel to the Zin Factories (Mount Zin) in southern Israel, with a spur to the Be'er Sheva Center Railway Station and branch lines to Ramat Hovav, the Arad phosphate mines and factories in Tzefa, and a connection to the Ashkelon–Beersheba railway. It is part of the main line of Israel Railways, of which the northern starting point of the line designated as the "line to Beersheba" is usually indicated as beginning at Na'an junction, where the railway splits to Beersheba and Jerusalem. Because the line is not limited to Beersheba, it is known in Israel as Mesilat HaDarom (Southern Railway).

Since the opening of the Dimona Railway Station in 2005, it has been used for passenger service from Nahariya to Be'er Sheva Center and from Be'er Sheva North to Dimona. The other two branches are used exclusively for freight services.

== History ==
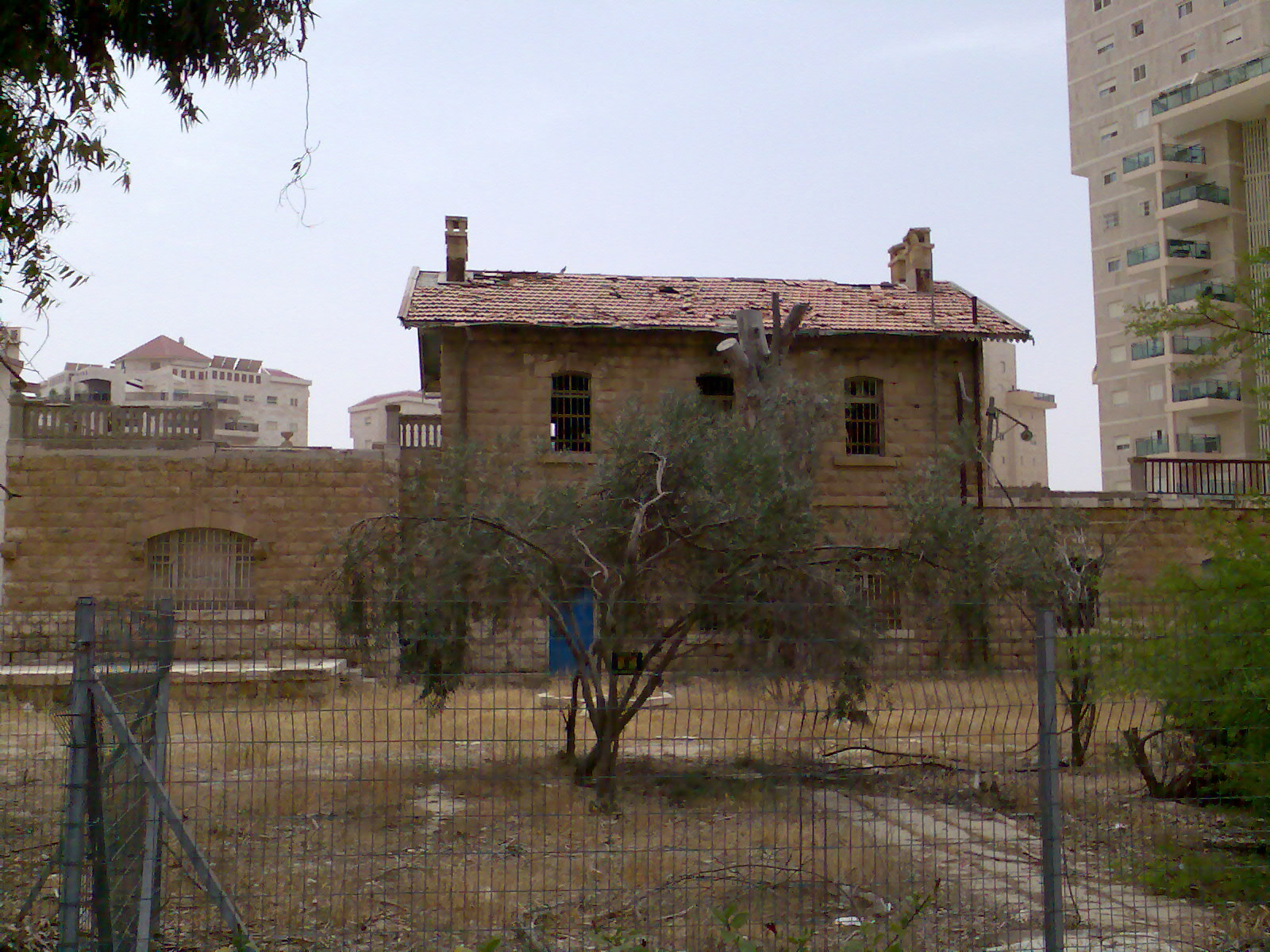
Turkish railway station in Beersheba before undergoing restoration in 2013.

British map (1917) showing the Turkish railway from Ramla to Auja

The railway traces its origins to the Ottoman rule in Palestine and the Sinai and Palestine military campaign of World War I. The main Turkish objective in the Middle East during World War I was to either capture or disable the Suez Canal, which would have put the British Empire at a great disadvantage. However, transporting troops and supplies from Constantinople to the front lines took months by camel caravan.

After his assault on the British garrison along the canal in January–February, 1915, Jamal Pasha enlisted the help of the German engineer Heinrich August Meissner, who also planned the Hejaz Railway, to help him find a more efficient method of logistics. Meissner started constructing a railway to the south of the Palestine region, with the Wadi Surar (Nahal Sorek) station serving as the starting point. Two railways were originally built: one to Beit Hanoun, and the other to Beersheba. The two lines were collectively called the 'Egyptian Branch'.

Because construction costs were high and materials hard to come by, the Jaffa–Lydda (Lod) section of the Jaffa–Jerusalem railway, as well as the extension to Acre of the Jezreel Valley railway were dismantled and their infrastructure reused on the Beersheba section. The Lydda–Wadi Surar section, previously of 1,000 mm (3 ft 3 3/8 in) metre gauge narrow gauge, was converted to the Hejaz railway width of 1,050 mm (3 ft 5 11/32 in) narrow gauge standard, in order to be of use with the lines to the south. In the north, the Hejaz railway was connected to Lydda (now Lod) via Jenin, Tulkarm and the Eastern railway, and offered continuous service from Damascus to Beersheba.

The line to Beersheba opened for traffic in the middle of October 1915, just 9 months from the start of construction. The rest of the planned Egyptian branch was never completed, although Meissner managed to continue the line from Beersheba further south to Kusseima in the Sinai Peninsula, a section of which can be seen (complete with an old boxcar) adjacent to the Ramat HaNegev Regional Council buildings on Highway 40 near Mashabei Sadeh. By 3 May 1918, the British had connected Beersheba to the coastal line with a 59 1/2-km-long 1,435 mm (4 ft 8 1/2 in) standard gauge line which branched off near Rafah. When they captured the old northbound line from Beersheba via Wadi Surar from the Turks, they first converted it to standard gauge by July 1918, then dismantled it entirely in October 1918. Thus the branch line from Rafah became the only rail connection to Beersheba, with a very infrequent service from Qantara; it, too, was discontinued in July 1927, citing low usage and high maintenance costs.

After the 1948 Arab-Israeli War the railway was rebuilt, in a straightened route and in standard gauge, by Israel Railways, and was originally meant for freight-only service. The second railway to Beersheba splits off the Jaffa–Jerusalem railway about 6 km north of the former Wadi Surar junction, then continues roughly along the old route to Kiryat Gat, then continues on a new route directly south, and approaches Beersheba from the north, whereas the old Turkish route made a lengthy detour to the southwest, and approached Beersheba from the northwest. The new line was completed in 1956, and passenger service started on September 29. Construction on the extensions to Dimona, Zin and Tzefa began shortly after. In 1967 the line reached Dimona, Oron in 1970 and Mount Zin in 1977. With the eventual decline of Israel Railways's passenger business, the passenger service to Beersheba was halted in 1979. Freight service on the railway continued however, and in the early 1980s the Heletz railway was built to provide another link between the Railway to Beersheba and the Lod-Ashkelon railway, serving as a shortcut for trains from southern Israel bound for the Port of Ashdod.

In the early-to-mid-1990s the line underwent another renovation which facilitated the renewal of passenger service, first to Be'er Sheva North in 1997, then extended to the city's center with the opening of Be'er Sheva Center in 2000. Nevertheless, the ride from Beersheba to Tel Aviv remained lengthy and train frequency constrained as the long stretch of railway from Lod to Beersheba still consisted of only a single track with sharp curves and other geometric deficiencies as well as many at-grade railroad crossings.

To alleviate the aforementioned issues, from Q3 2004 to Q2 2012, the entire line from north of Na'an junction to Be'er Sheva Center was double tracked and rebuilt on an improved route with gentler curves in many places, all level crossings replaced by grade separations, and increased station capacity. This effort faced many bureaucratic challenges and the need for extensive right of way purchases, thus raising land owners' objections, and was further complicated by the requirement for the existing line to stay in use during the works. The length of this project, which began at the Lod Railway Station, was 87 km and cost NIS 2.8 billion. The rebuilt line has reduced train delays, enabled many more trains to operate along the route and shortened the travel time from Tel Aviv to Beersheba from over 80 minutes before the works began to about 55 minutes after the project was completed (with the possibility of further reductions in travel time following the line's planned electrification and when faster rolling stock will be added to Israel Railways' fleet in the future). Consequently, in the years since the line's reconstruction there has been a significant increase in the number of train passengers to and from Beersheba.

In September 2015 a connection between the Railway to Beersheba and the Ashkelon–Beersheba railway was opened using a flying junction at Goral Junction north of Beersheba. The section of railway between Goral and Be'er Sheva North Railway Station is designed to be triple-tracked in the future.

== Passenger service ==
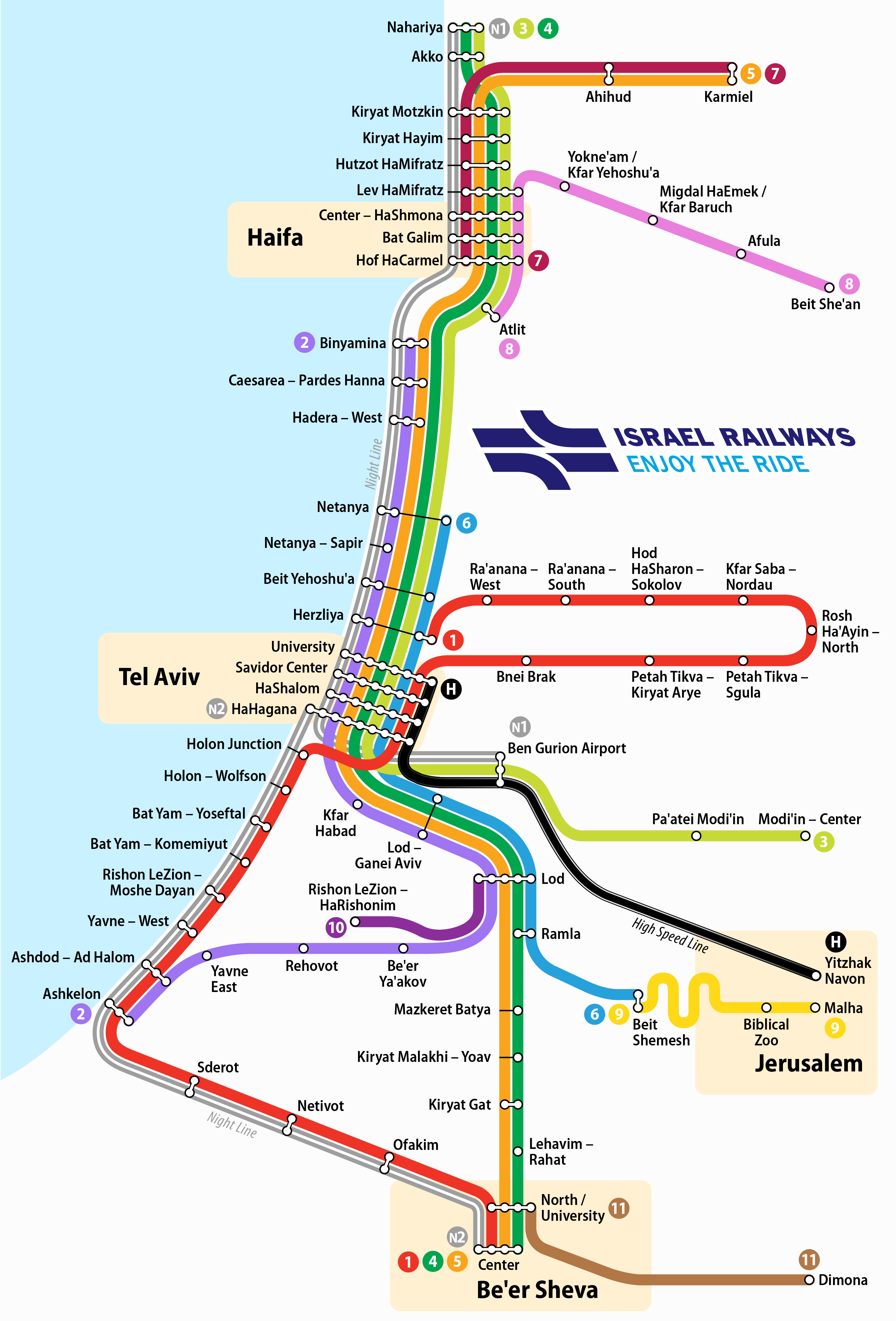
The green and orange lines use the railway to Beersheba

There are currently three Israel Railways passenger lines using the railway to Beersheba. The Nahariya–Beersheba and Karmiel–Beersheba services are deployed on the same route, via Lod. The line, south of Na'an junction, has the following stations:

- Mazkeret Batya
- Kiryat Mal'akhi – Yoav, near Kfar Menahem and Route 383, mainly to serve the nearby city Kiryat Mal'akhi and the bus terminal at Mal'akhi Junction
- Kiryat Gat
- Lehavim–Rahat
- Be'er Sheva North
- Be'er Sheva Center

The second service is a low-capacity two-station line from Be'er Sheva North to Dimona.

In addition, trains using the Ashkelon–Beersheba railway use a section of the railway to Beersheba south of Goral Junction on their way to and from Beersheba.

== Current status and future plans ==
Currently in the design phase are plans to electrify the line using 25 kV 50 Hz AC overhead line, with electrification works expected to start by 2023.

In 2012, preliminary design began on extending the line southwards through the Arava, in order to provide both passenger and freight service to the Red Sea port city of Eilat, although no funds have been appropriated for construction (which is estimated to cost the equivalent of several billion US dollars), and with the plan also facing strong opposition from environmental groups.

In 2004, a southern branch to the Ramat Hovav and Ramat Beka industrial zones was opened, and further extension of this line to reach the Israel Defense Forces' main Training Bases complex near HaNegev Junction is planned. Also planned is a new line branching out to Arad, passing nearby the Nevatim Airbase and Kuseife.
