= Route 411 (Israel) =

Route in Israel

Coordinates: 31°51′34.0″N 34°48′56.0″E

Route 411
- כביש 411
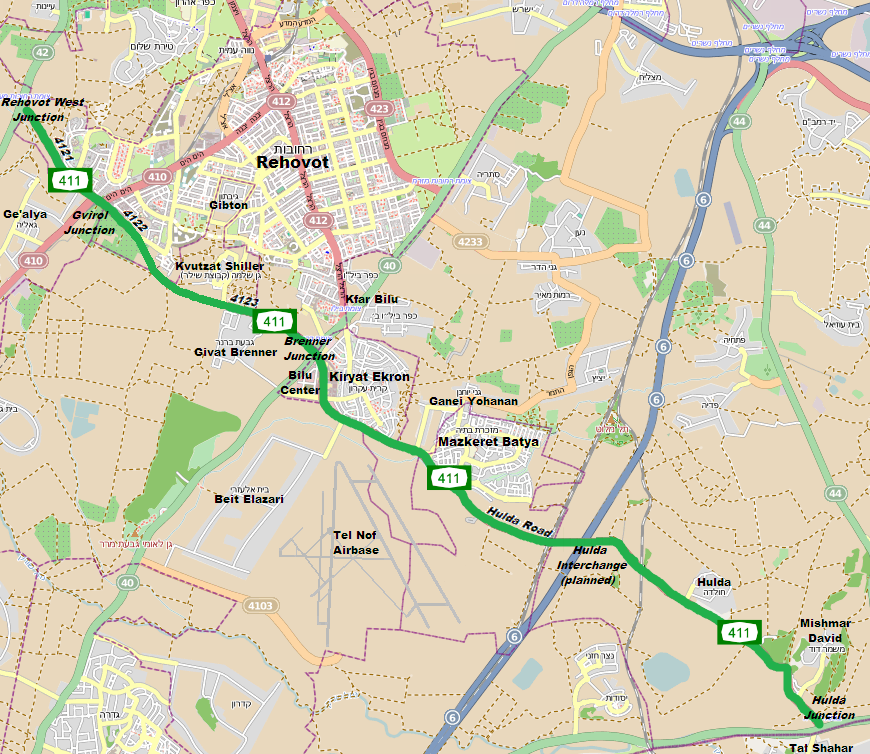

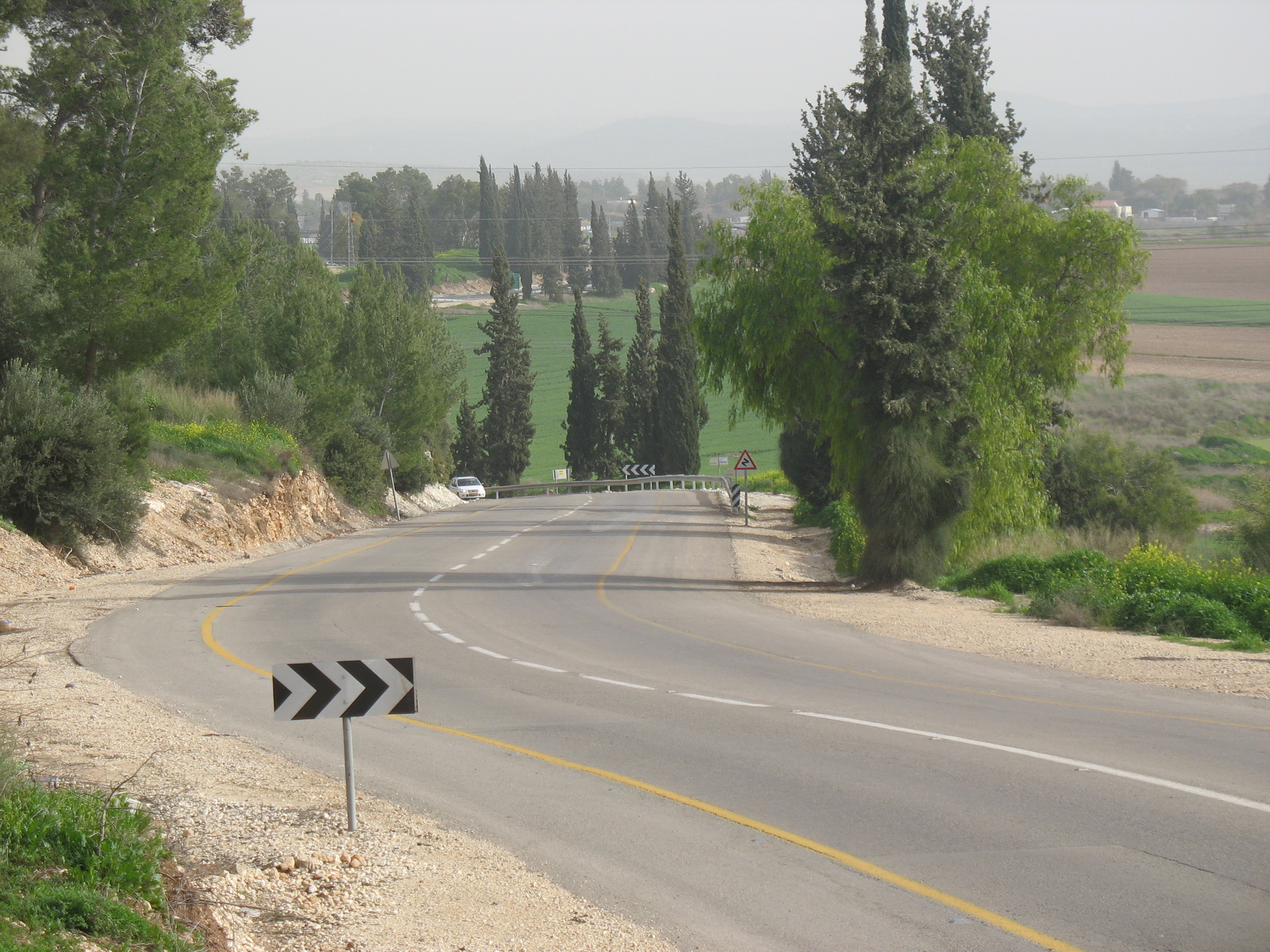
- The route southeastward adjacent to Hulda Forest

Route information
- Length: 16.7 km (10.4 mi) 18 km (11 mi) upon completion of connection
- Component highways: Road 4121, Road 4122, Road 4123, Hulda Road

Major junctions
- West end: Western Rehovot Junction
- Gevirol Interchange; Brenner Junction; Batya Junction; Hulda Interchange (planned)
- East end: Hulda Junction

Location
- Country: Israel
- Major cities: Rehovot, Kiryat Ekron, Mazkeret Batya, Hulda

Highway system
- Roads in Israel; Highways
← Route 410	→ Route 412

Route 411 (Hebrew: כביש 411), is the designation of a regional route in the Shephelah region in Israel running southeasterly consolidating previous local roads and new construction. The western section begins at Highway 42 near Kfar Gevirol in western Rehovot and continues just past Route 410. The central section, completed in June 2014, continues to the entrance of Kvutzat Shiller. The eastern section begins just short of Highway 40 south of Rehovot and terminates at Highway 3 towards Jerusalem, bypassing the towns of Kiryat Ekron and Mazkeret Batya.

== Route description ==
The western section of the road starts at Rehovot Ma'arav Junction with Highway 42. This section was previously labeled Road 4121. It runs south-east for approximately 2 km to the newly built elevated Gvirol Junction with Route 410 above the Lod - Ashkelon Railway. It then continues 1.4 km as Road 4122 (Derech Yom HaKippurim), deviating slightly south before the traffic circle at Derech Sheshet HaYamim and continuing to Kvutzat Shiller, forming the central section completed June 2014.

The eastern section begins as Road 4123 adjacent to Kvutzat Shiller and Givat Brenner, running 1.9 km to Brenner Junction with Highway 40 adjacent to Kiryat Ekron. After Brenner Junction, the road is known as the Hulda Road, It begins by running south with two junctions and a roundabout providing access to Bilu Center, a major outdoor shopping center and Kiryat Ekron. This section is undivided, with one lane in each direction and is often congested, especially during weekends and holidays. The road then turns south-east, becoming a dual-carriageway for approximately 2.4 km while bypassing Kiryat Ekron and providing access to Mazkeret Batya.

Halfway between the two entrances to Mazkeret Batya, the road is once again downgraded to a single-carriageway for 7.8 km with bridges passing over the Tel Aviv - Be'er Sheva Railway and Highway 6 and an underpass under the Tel Aviv - Jerusalem Railway. It passes the entrance to Kibbutz Hulda first settled in 1909, hence the road's historic name. Further east, the road becomes more winding, passing the Hulda Forest, crossing the Shoham Stream and passing the entrance to Mishmar David before terminating at Hulda Junction with Highway 3.

== History ==
The bypass of Mazkeret Batya and Kiryat Ekron was originally built in the 1960s and was only slightly improved until 2000 when the National Roads Authority began a project to upgrade this section to dual-carriageway standards. These works included the construction of the temporary roundabout at Bilu Center, however they were stopped two years later due to lack of funds, leaving the road in its poor current state. The only section completed as a dual-carriageway is between Beit Elazari and Mazkeret Batya. Traffic lights were added to two of the junctions on this section in 2007.

The bridge over Highway 6 was built in 2002 by Derech Eretz, the Highway 6 operator. The underpass under the Tel Aviv - Jerusalem Railway opened in February 2009

The western section was partially opened between Highway 42 and Kfar Gevirol, without the connection to Route 410, on August 18, 2008. It was built as part of a major project to build a grade separation between Route 410 and the Lod - Ashkelon Railway, replacing a dangerous at-grade crossing. The bridge above the railway as well as the junction with Route 410 opened on February 28, 2009.

The National Roads Company of Israel published tenders in 2012 to complete the missing central section between Derech Yom HaKippurim and Kvutzat Shiller. Until its completion, the city of Rehovot built an inner bypass via Sheshet HaYamim, Shimon Dubnov, Ben Tzion Fogel, Hazit HaDarom, Shimshon Tzur and David Nuttman Streets as a temporary connection between the two sections. The section was completed in June 2014, three months later than originally planned.

== Future plans ==
Plans to build an interchange with Highway 6 were approved, and as of early 2009, Derech Eretz was seeking government funding for such a connection.

There are also plans to upgrade all of Route 411 to dual-carriageway, including a grade separation that is under construction in 2011-2012 with the Railway to Beersheba and a new bridge to replace the dangerous curve over Shaham Stream.

== Junctions (West to East) ==
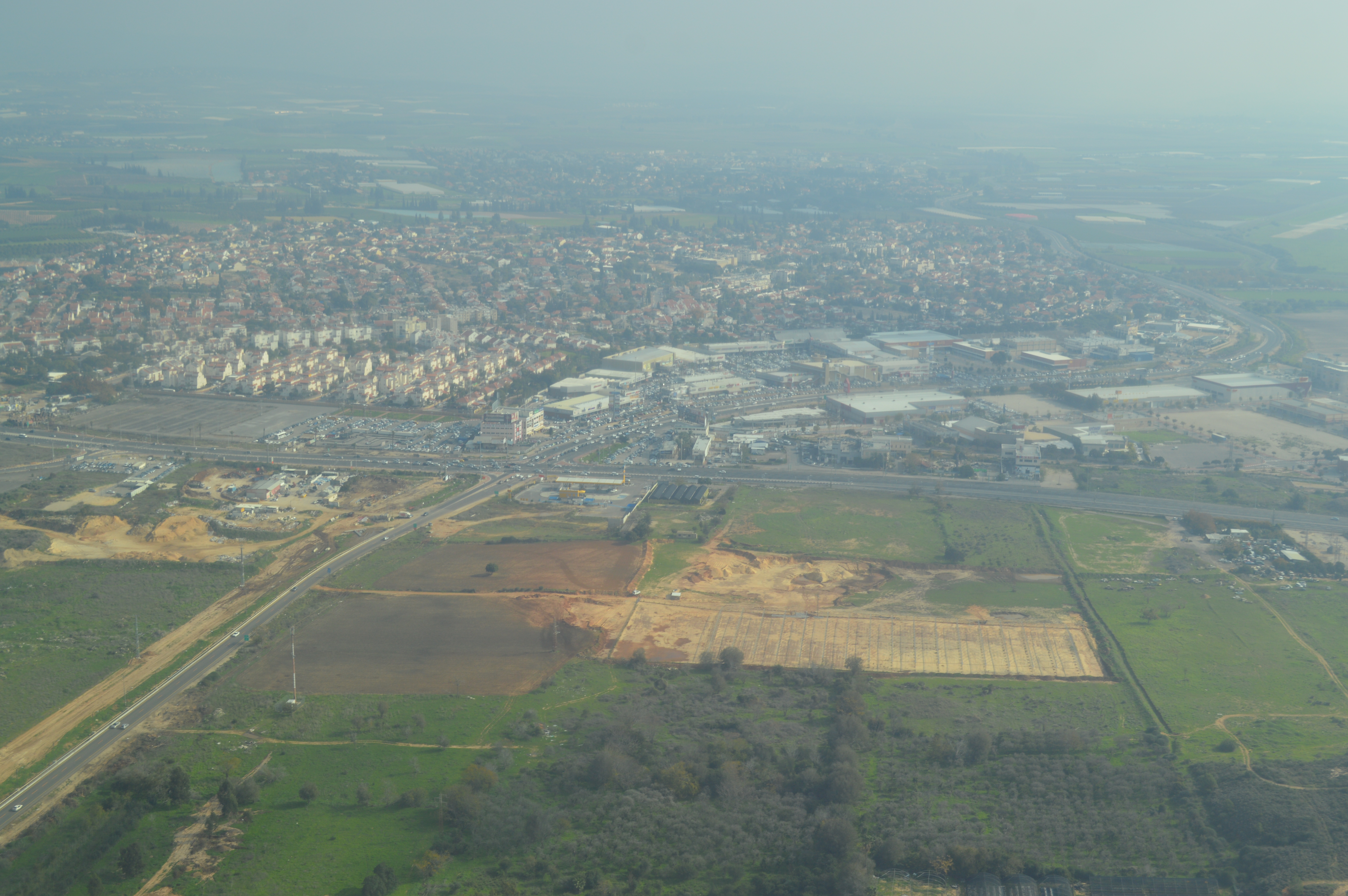
Route 411 (from bottom left) eastward crossing Highway 40, curving southeasterly passing Bilu Center and Kiryat Ekron

District	Location	km	mi	Name	Destinations	Notes
Central	Rehovot	0	0.0	צומת רחובות מערב (Western Rehovot Junction)	Highway 42	
Central	Rehovot	1.4	0.87		Harduf St.	
Central	Ge'alya	1.9	1.2	צומת גבירול (Gevirol Junction)	Route 410 (southbound)	Western end of concurrency with Route 410
Central	Ge'alya	2.1	1.3	צומת גבירול (Gevirol Junction)	Route 410 (northbound)	Eastern end of concurrency with Route 410
Central	Kvutzat Shiller	4.7	2.9		Road 4123	
Central	Givat Brenner	5	3.1		Entrance to Givat Brenner	
Central	Kiryat Ekron	6.6	4.1	צומת ברנר (Brenner Junction)	Highway 40	
Central	Kiryat Ekron	7.8	4.8		Yitzhak Rabin Blvd.	
Central	Beit Elazari	8.3	5.2		HaRimon St.	
Central	Kiryat Ekron	8.8	5.5		Marvad HaKsamim St.	
Central	Ganei Yohanan	9.8	6.1		Rotschild Blvd.	
Central	Mazkeret Batya	10.5	6.5	צומת בתיה (Batya Junction)	Motta Gur Blvd.	
Central	Hulda	12.7	7.9	מחלף חולדה (Hulda Interchange)	Highway 6	
Central	Hulda	14.8	9.2		Entrance to Hulda	
Central	Mishmar David	17.3	10.7		Entrance to Mishmar David	
Central	Tal Shahar	18	11	צומת חולדה (Hulda Junction)	Highway 3	
1.000 mi = 1.609 km; 1.000 km = 0.621 mi: Concurrency terminus; Proposed
