= Route 412 (Israel) =

Route in Israel

Route 412
- כביש 412
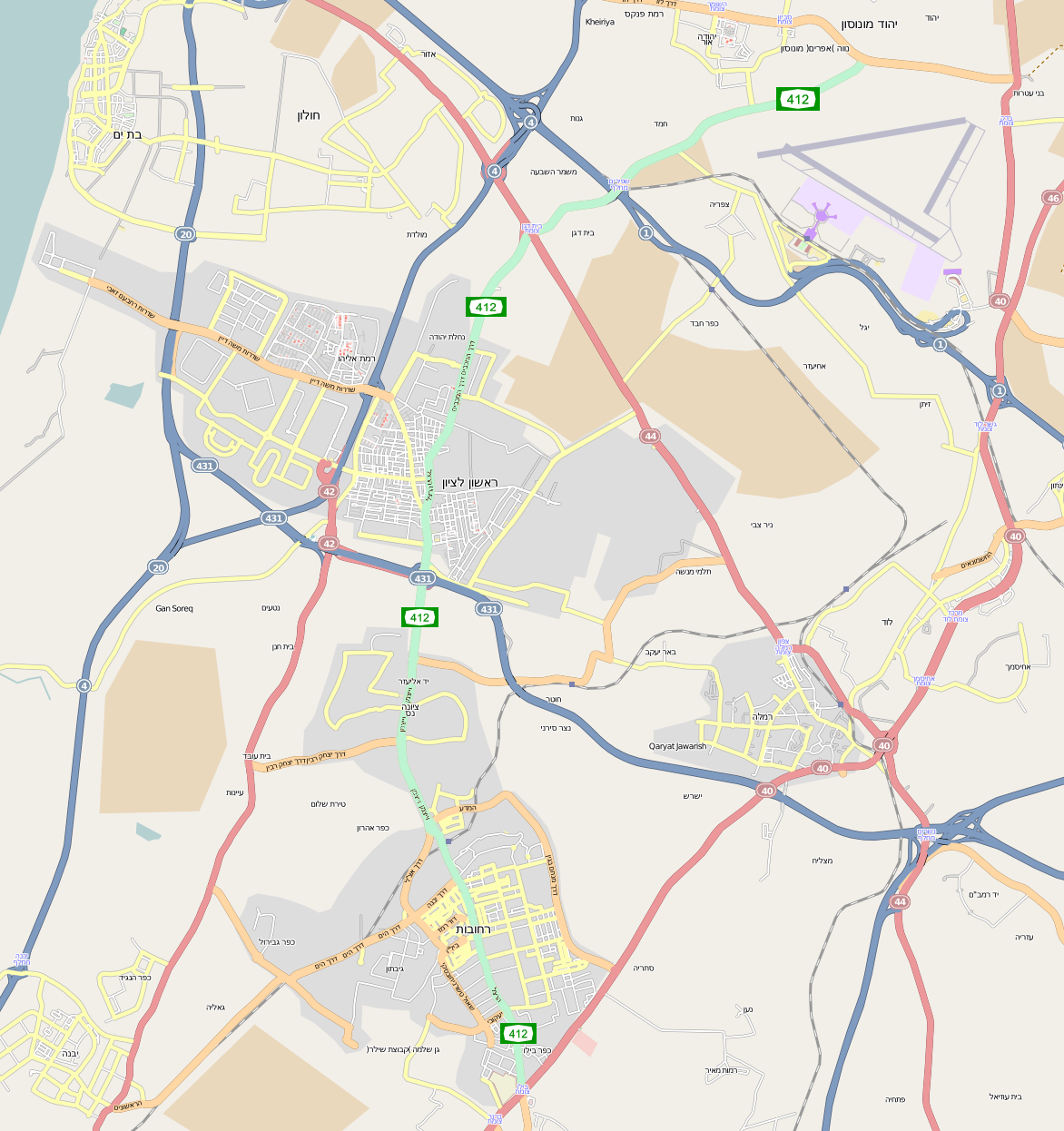

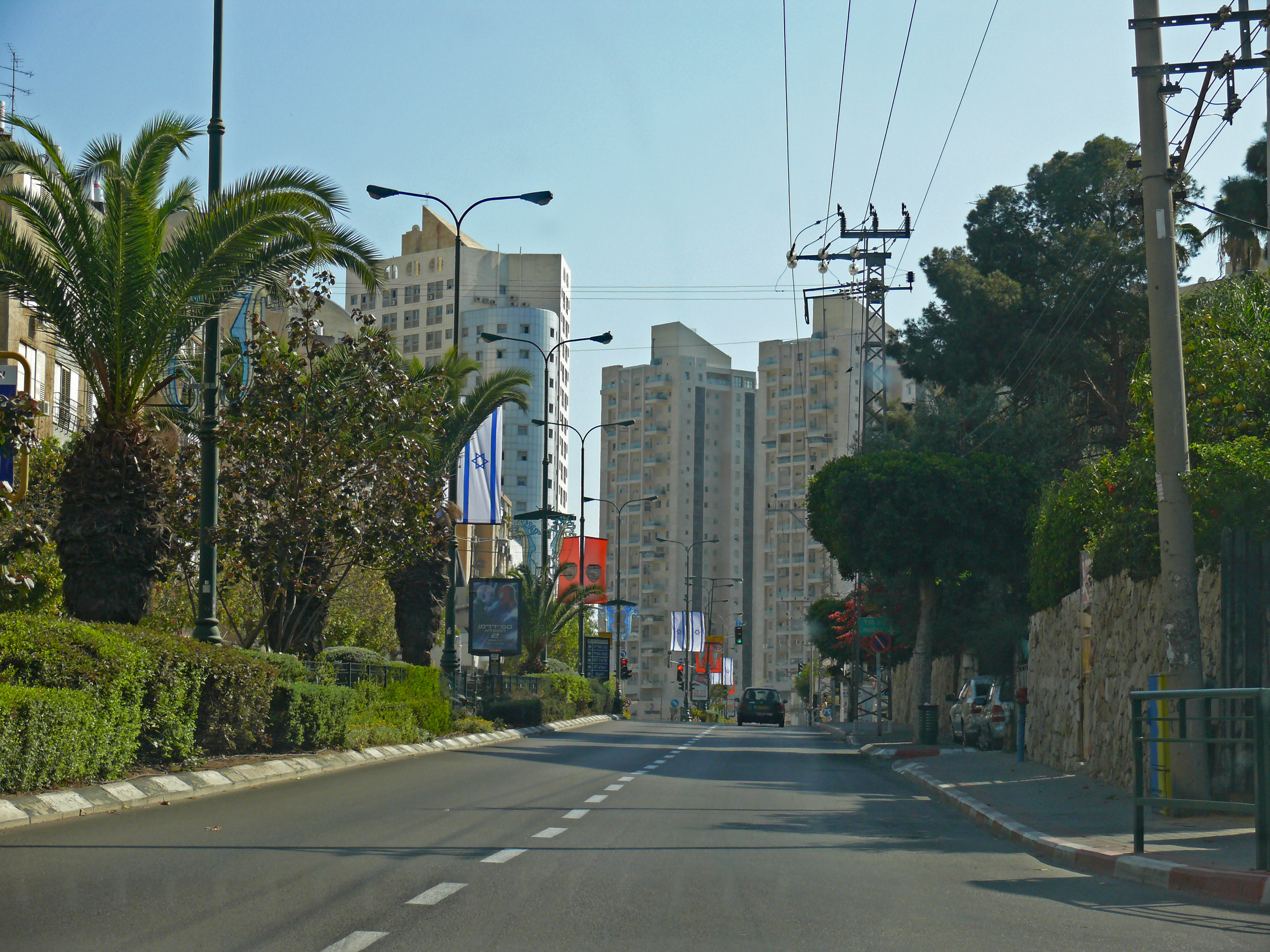
- Herzl boulevard, Rishon LeZion, looking south

Route information
- Length: 22 km (14 mi)

Major junctions
- South end: Bilu Junction
- North end: East Yehud Junction

Location
- Country: Israel
- Major cities: Rehovot, Nes Tziona, Rishon LeTzion, Beit Dagan, Or Yehuda, Yehud

Highway system
- Roads in Israel; Highways
| ← Route 411 | → Route 417 |

Route 412 (Hebrew: כביש 412) is a regional road in the south-east of the Tel Aviv Metropolitan Area in Israel. The road connects Bilu Junction south of Rehovot, with Yehud Ma'arav Junction, running through Rehovot, Ness Ziona, Rishon LeZion and Beit Dagan and spanning a distance of approximately 22 km.

== Route description ==
Route 412 is an urban road for most of its length, widely changing its width depending on available urban space. Its urban sections are usually very busy, passing through the crowded city centers of Rehovot, Ness Ziona and Rishon LeZion with many signalled intersections.

Route 412 starts at Bilu Junction, a large intersection with Highway 40, making it the central entrance to Rehovot from the south. It runs north as a four-lane (two lanes in each direction) divided urban road until it reaches central Rehovot, where it narrows in size to one lane in each direction. Leaving the city center, it once again widens to four lanes until it reaches a level crossing with the Lod–Ashkelon railway, just west of the Rehovot Railway Station. It then widens to five lanes (three northbound, two southbound) as it leaves Rehovot.

Entering Ness Ziona, there is a large junction with Road 4303 leading towards Highway 42. The road passes through Ness Ziona as a four-lane divided urban road. Exiting Ness Ziona, HaRishonim Interchange connects the road with Route 431.

Passing through Rishon LeZion, the road varies in length between five (three northbound, two southbound) to six lanes, with the right lane serving as a public transportation lane during rush hours. Exiting Rishon LeZion, the road reaches Beit Dagan Junction with Highway 44.

From Beit Dagan Junction, Route 412 becomes a standard inter-city highway, with two lanes in each direction, paved shoulders, a concrete median barrier and few signalled intersections. The road bypasses Beit Dagan and Or Yehuda to its terminus at Yehud Ma'arav Junction, the south-western entrance to Yehud.

== Future plans ==
A road bridge designed to replace the overcrowded railway crossing in Rehovot is currently under construction. The bridge will be built by the Ayalon Highway Company and is due for completion in 2014.

A dedicated bus rapid transit route is planned along the urban section of Route 412, between Bilu Junction and Beit Dagan Junction, as part of a larger mass-transit system designed to serve the entire Tel Aviv Metropolitan Area. From Beit Dagan Junction, the BRT route will continue north-west along Highway 44 to its terminus at Holon Interchange, where it will meet the Green Line of the Tel Aviv Light Rail.

== See also ==
- List of highways in Israel
