= Highway 3 (Israel) =

Highway in Israel

Coordinates: 31°46′29″N 34°48′28″E

Highway 3
- Hebrew: כביש 3 Arabic: طريق السريع 3
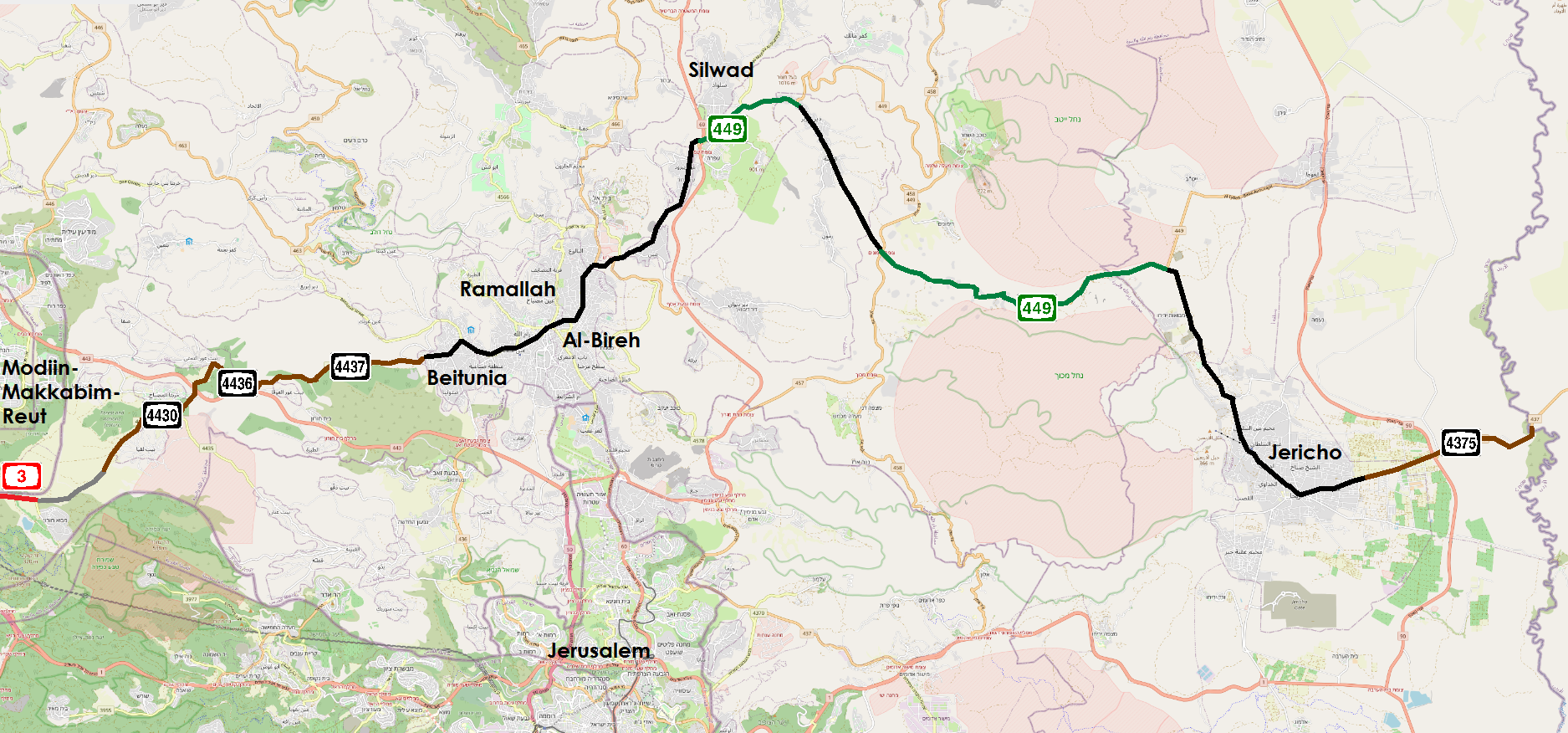
- Map of the former segments of the Highway in the West Bank, Now declassified.

Route information
- Part of (Ratified by Palestine but not by Israel)
- Length: 47 km (29 mi)

Major junctions
- West end: Abba Hillel Silver Junction
- Hodaya Junction; Malakhi Junction; Re'em Junction; Sorek Interchange; Hulda Junction; Nahshon Junction; Hativa Sheva Junction; Latrun Interchange
- East end: Mevo Horon Junction

Location
- Country: Israel
- Major cities: Ashkelon, Hodaya, Kiryat Malakhi, Yad Binyamin, Yesodot, Hulda, Nachshon, Latrun, Modi'in

Highway system
- Roads in Israel; Highways
← Highway 2	→ Highway 4

Highway 3 is a highway in Israel. It begins at Highway 4 on the outskirts of Ashkelon, running east-northeast, passing through Kiryat Malakhi and Latrun, and ending just short of Modi'in.

== Plan for the future ==
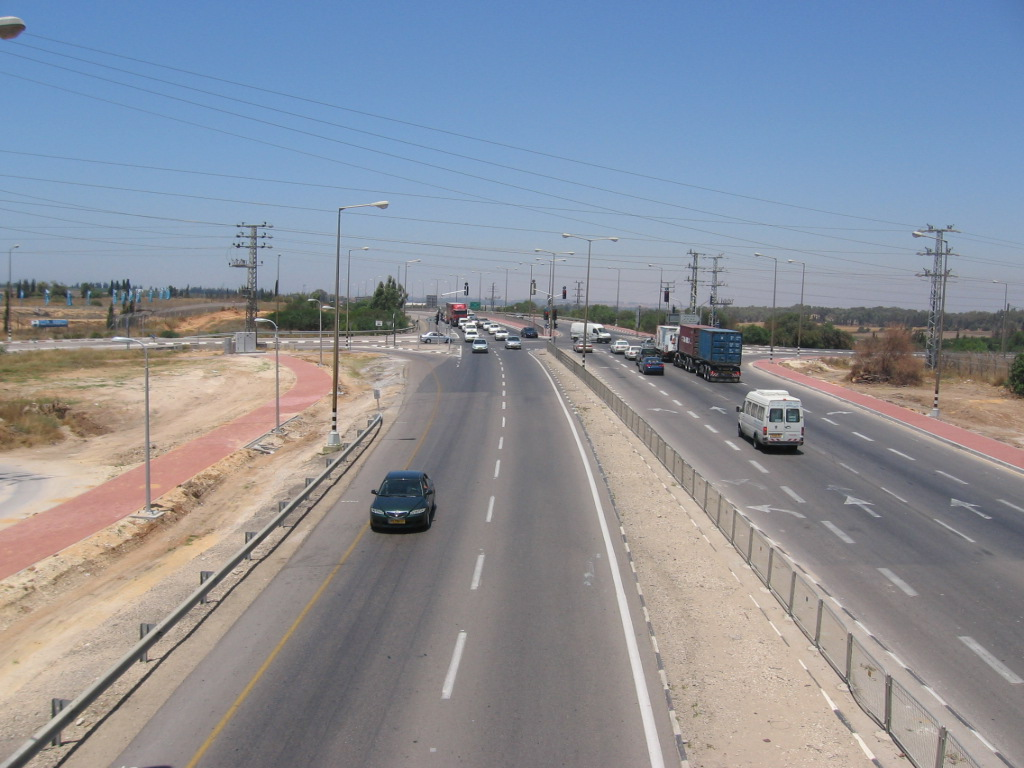
Abba Hillel Silver Junction

The Israeli Ministry of Transportation plans for Highway 3 to be a major route that will connect the South District to Jerusalem via Latrun Interchange and Highway 1. The National Roads Company of Israel is converting the road to a multi-lane divided highway. Despite this, the road will not become an expressway because it is the only means of entrance to many nearby communities.

Israel Railways is constructing flying junctions between Highway 3 and the rail tracks that cross it.

== Path of Highway 3 from northeast to southwest ==
The northeast part of Highway 3 begins at Beit Horon Junction near Modi'in. It intersects Highways 1 and 6 and then passes several kibbutzim and moshavim until Re'em Junction where it joins Highway 40, running concurrently for 4 km until Malakhi Junction in Kiryat Malakhi. The Latrun–Nahshon section (between the intersections with highways 1 and 44) is the first concrete highway in Israel.

After the roads split, Highway 3 continues in Kiryat Malakhi and past more kibbutzim and moshavim until Abba Hillel Silver Junction east of Ashkelon, which intersects with Highway 4.

In the past, Highway 3 reached Ramallah and Jericho and terminated at Allenby bridge across the Jordan River. After the Oslo Accords in 1993, the portion of the road that passes through Ramallah and Jericho was transferred to Palestinian control (as with Highway 60), and portions of the road that remained under Israeli control were renamed as local roads.

== Junctions and Interchanges ==
District	Location	km	mi	Name	Destinations	Notes
Southern	Ashkelon	0	0.0	צומת אבא הלל (Abba Hillel Junction)	Highway 4	
Southern	Nir Israel	2	1.2	צומת ניר ישראל (Nir Yisrael Junction)	Road 3500	
Southern	Hodaya	4	2.5	צומת הודיה (Hodaya Junction)	Route 232	
Southern	Negba	7	4.3	צומת נגבה (Negba Junction)	Road 3612	
Southern	Masu'ot Yitzhak	8	5.0	צומת משואות יצחק (Masu'ot Yitzhak Junction)	Local road	
Southern	Merkaz Shapira	9	5.6	צומת מרכז שפירא (Shapira Center Junction)	Entrance road	Named after Haim-Moshe Shapira
Southern	Ein Tsurim	10	6.2	צומת עין צורים (Ein Tsurim Junction)	Entrance road	
Southern	Shafir	11	6.8	צומת שפיר (Shafir Junction)	Road 3613	
Southern	Kfar Warburg; Avigdor	13	8.1	צומת כפר ורבורג-אביגדור (Kfar Warburg-Avigdor Junction)	Local roads	Named after Felix M. Warburg & Henry d'Avigdor-Goldsmid
Southern	Be'er Tuvia	14.5	9.0	צומת טוביה (Tuvia Junction)	Yigal Hurwitz Blvd. Road 3703	
Southern	Kiryat Malakhi	16	9.9	צומת מלאכי / קסטינה (Malakhi Junction / Qastina)	Highway 40	
Southern	Kfar Ahim	18	11	צומת אחים (Ahim Junction	Local road	
Central	Bnei Re'em	20	12	צומת ראם (Re'em Junction)	Highway 40	
Central	Yoav	21	13	צומת שערי אברהם (She'arei Avraham Junction)	Route 383	
Central	Revadim	22	14	צומת רבדים (Revadim Junction)	Entrance road	
Central	Beit Hilkia	24	15	צומת בית חלקיה (Beit Hilkia Junction)	Road 3933	
Central	Yad Binyamin	25	16	צומת יד בנימין (Yad Binyamin Junction)	Entrance road	
Central	Yad Binyamin	26	16	מחלף שורק (Sorek Interchange) and railway overpass	Highway 6	Named after nearby Sorek River
Central	Yad Binyamin	26.5	16.5	מחלף שורק (Sorek Interchange) and railway overpass	Highway 7	Named after nearby Sorek River
Central	Yesodot	29	18	צומת יסודות (Yesodot Junction)	Entrance road	
Central	Tal Shahar	33	21	צומת חולדה (Hulda Junction)	Route 411	
Central	Tal Shahar	35	22	צומת נחשון (Nachshon Junction)	Highway 44	Named after Operation Nachshon
Central	Beko'a	36	22	מחלף בקוע (Beko'a Interchange)	Entrance road	
Central	Nahshon; Neve Shalom	38	24	מחלף נחשון / נווה שלום (Mahshon / Neve Shalom Interchange)	Local road	
Central	Latrun	41	25	צומת חטיבה שבע (Hativa Sheva Junction)	Route 424	
Green Line
Judea and Samaria	Latrun	42	26	מחלף לטרון (Latrun Interchange)	Highway 1	
Judea and Samaria	Modi'in	45	28	צומת מודיעין (Modi'in Junction)	HaHashmonaim Blvd.	
Judea and Samaria	Mevo Horon	47	29	צומת מבוא חורון (Mevo Horon Junction)	Road 4556	
1.000 mi = 1.609 km; 1.000 km = 0.621 mi

== Hazardous road ==
15 km of highway 3 had been declared as a red road by the Israeli police in 2015.

== See also ==
- List of highways in Israel
