= Highway 40 (Israel) =

Road in Israel

Highway 40
- כביש 40
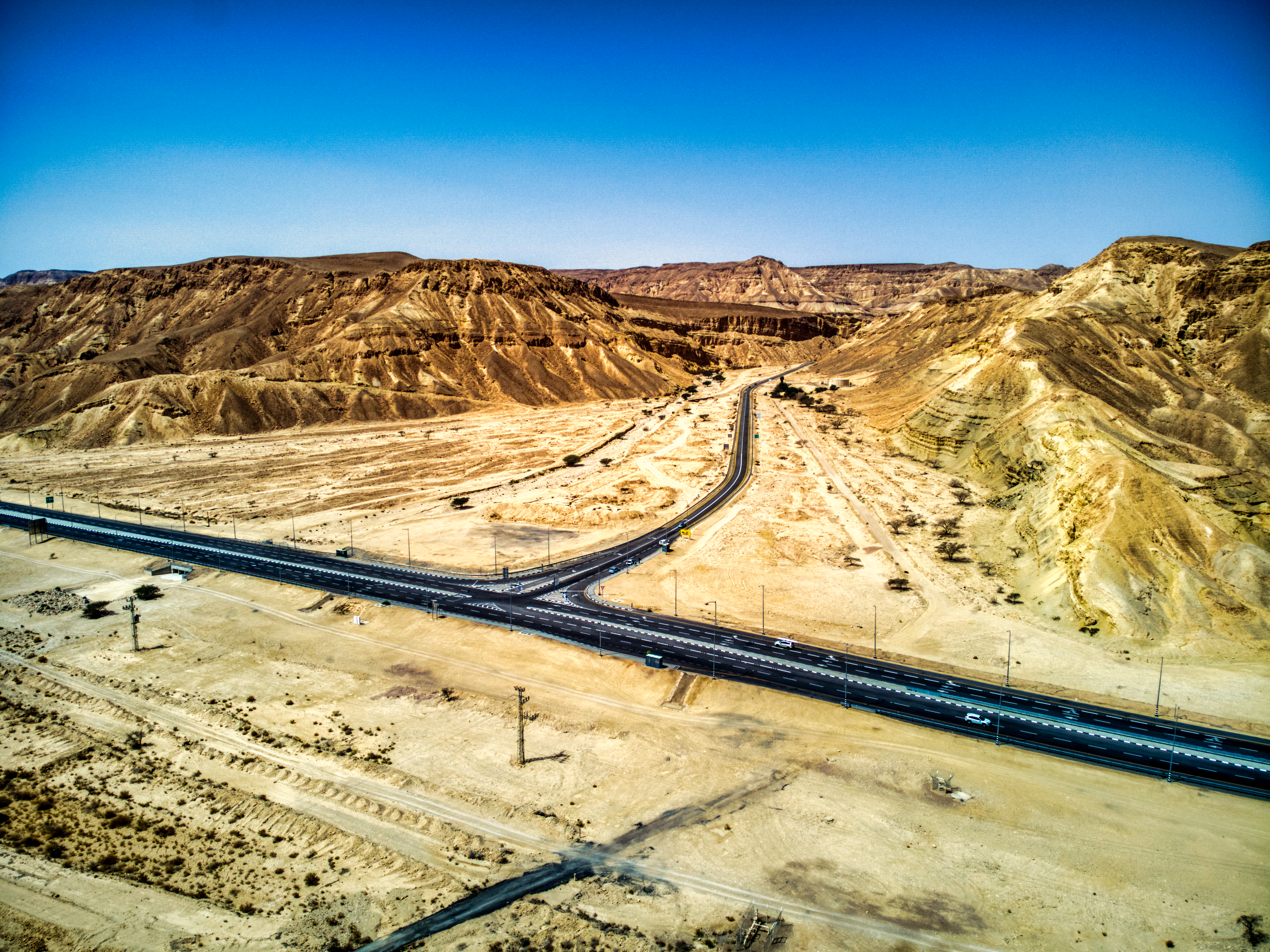
- Ketura Junction

Route information
- Length: 294 km (183 mi)

Major junctions
- South end: Ketura Junction
- Nokdim Junction; Sara Junction; Hativat HaNegev Junction; Goral Junction; Lehavim Junction; Plugot Junction; Malakhi Junction; Re'em Junction; Gedera Junction; Bilu Junction; Ramlod Interchange; Lod Interchange; EL AL Junction; HaTayasim Junction; Segula Junction; Yarkon Interchange; Elishema Interchange
- North end: Kfar Saba

Location
- Country: Israel
- Major cities: Mitzpe Ramon, Be'er Sheva, Rahat, Kiryat Malakhi, Gedera, Rehovot, Ramla, Lod, Petah Tikva, Hod HaSharon, Kfar Saba

Highway system
- Roads in Israel; Highways
← Highway 38	→ Highway 41

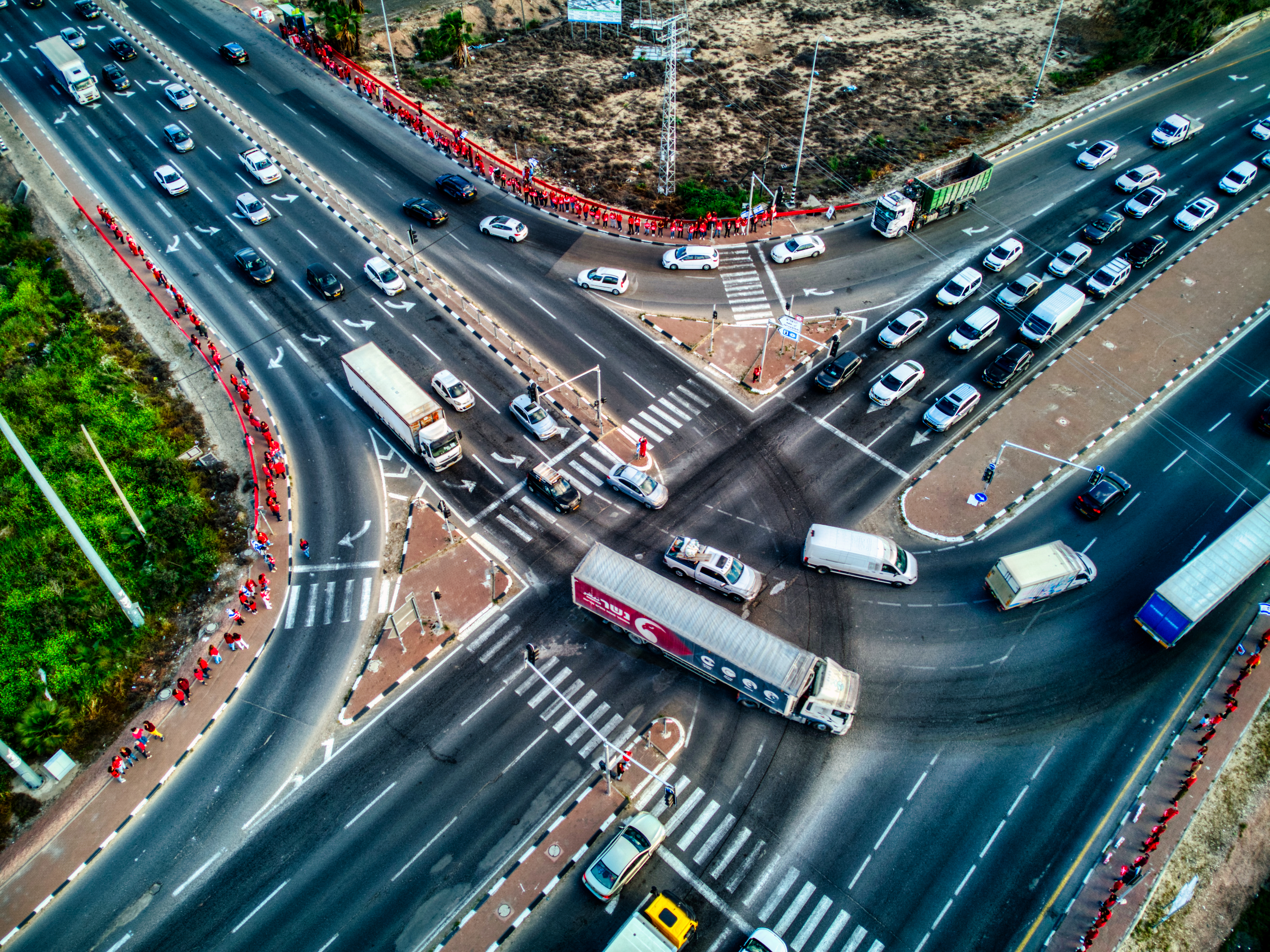
Re'em Junction / Masmiya

Highway 40 (Hebrew: כביש 40) is a north-south intercity road in Israel. At 302 km long, it is the second longest highway in Israel, after Highway 90. The highway runs from Kfar Saba in the center of Israel to the Arabah in the south, serving as a main connection between central Israel and Be'er Sheva.

== Route description ==
The highway starts at an intersection with Highway 90 near Ketura, about 50 km north of Eilat as a two-lane undivided road. It then continues north, winding through the mountains of the southern Negev. This section includes the "Meishar", which is a completely straight and leveled 12 km stretch of road. The highway descends into the Ramon Crater, crosses it and then ascends 250 meters along "Ma'ale HaAtzmaut" to reach Mitzpe Ramon. From Mitzpe Ramon the highway continues past Ramon Air Force Base and Sde Boker.

The section between Ketura and Sde Boker is a scenic route, and some drivers use this road when driving to Eilat because it provides more attractions and scenery, as opposed to highway 90 which is considered to be safer and faster.

From Sde Boker the highway continues past numerous Bedouin settlements and the Ramat Hovav industrial area. Between Nokdim Junction and Goral Junction the highway forms an eastern bypass of Be'er Sheva, also passing Omer and the Bedouin towns of Shaqib al-Salam and Tel as-Sabi. From Goral Junction the highway continues as a dual-carriageway four lane road, passing Lehavim, Rahat and Kiryat Gat.

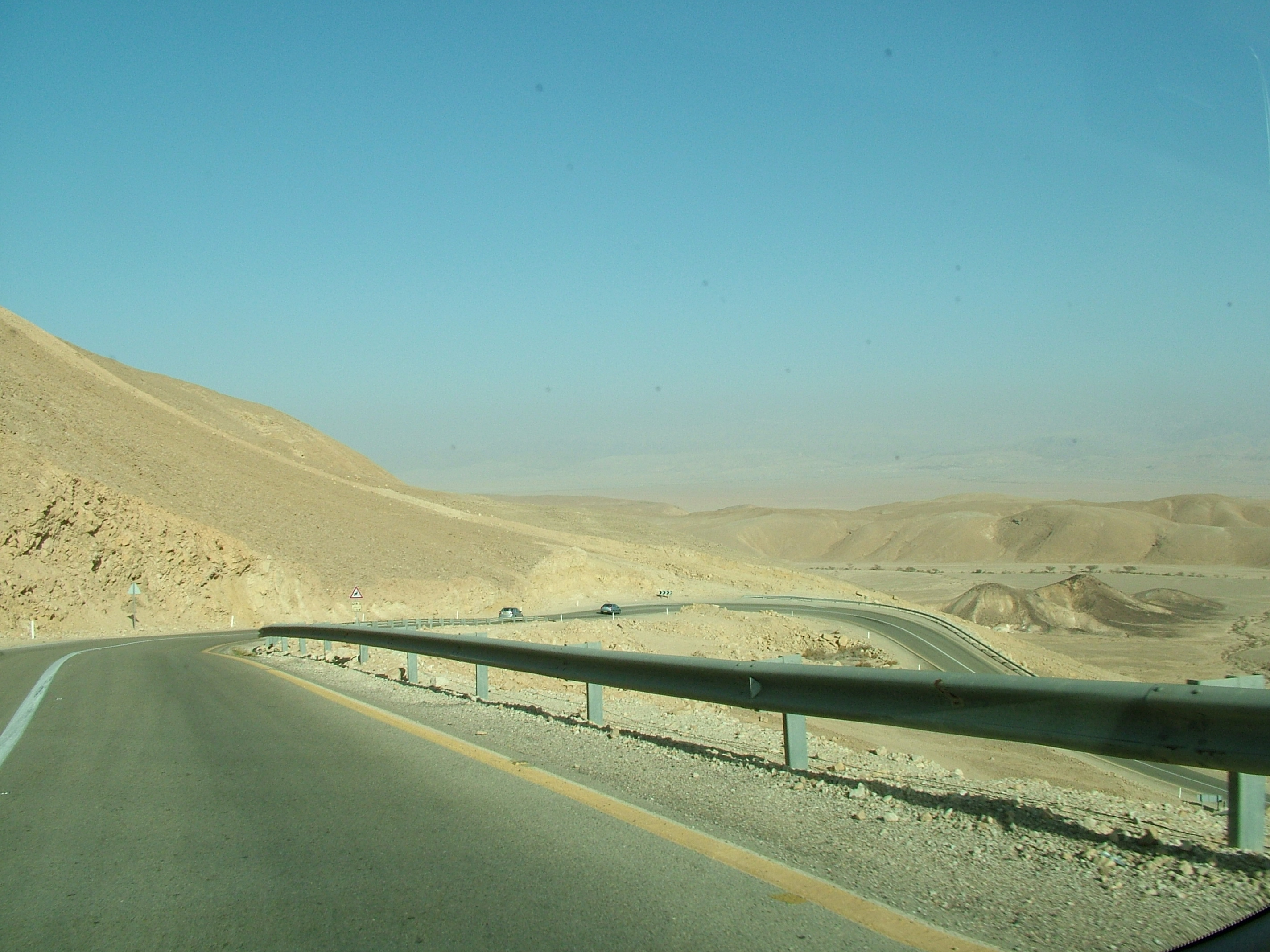
Descending the northern ridge of the Ramon Crater

North of Kiryat Malakhi, the highway merges with Highway 3 for 4 km to Re'em Junction. This short section has six lanes (three in each direction). It then continues as a four lane road, passing through Gedera and past Tel Nof Air Force Base and Rehovot. Between Matzliah Junction and Gesher Lod Junction it forms an eastern bypass of Ramle and Lod.

At El Al Junction the highway turns left towards Ben Gurion International Airport and immediately right at a roundabout. It is then downgraded in size to two lanes until IAI Junction, where it becomes a four lane divided carriageway once again. The highway then continues through Petah Tikva and bypasses Hod HaSharon before terminating at an intersection with Highway 55 in Kfar Saba.

== Junctions and interchanges ==
The following junctions and interchanges are listed from south to north.

km	Name	Type	Meaning	Location	Road(s) crossed
0	צומת קטורה (Ketura Junction)		name of nearby hill and Kibbutz ult. Second wife of Abraham	Lotan, Ketura	Highway 90 (Israel)
9	צומת נווה חריף (Neve Harif Junction)		ult. Moshe Harif	Neve Harif	local road
10	צומת נאות סמדר (Ne'ot Smadar Junction)		Beauty of Nascent Fruit	Neot Smadar (Shizafon)	local road
12	צומת שיזפון (Shizafon Junction)		Suntan	Shizafon Army Base	Highway 12
26	צומת שיטים (Shittim Junction)		Acacia wood ult. name of ancient location	Shittim	local road
38	צומת ציחור (Tzihor Junction)		Whiteness, Purity	Tzihor Stream	Highway 13
81	צומת מכתש רמון (Makhtesh Ramon Junction)		Ramon Crater	Makhtesh Ramon	local road
90	צומת מצפה רמון (Mitzpe Ramon Junction)		Ramon Overlook	Mitzpe Ramon	local road
90.4				Mitzpe Ramon	Mount Sagi St.
91				Mitzpe Ramon	Mount Oded St.
90				Mitzpe Ramon; Industrial Zone	Mount Katum St.
95	צומת הרוחות (HaRuchot Junction)		The Winds	Mitzpe Ramon; Landing Strip	Route 171
117	צומת ציפורים (Tziporim Junction)		Birds	Ramat Tziporim	local road
121	צומת מדרשת בן גוריון (Midreshet Ben Gurion Junction)		Ben Gurion College	Midreshet Ben-Gurion	local road
125	צומת שדה בוקר (Sde Boker Junction)		Herding Field	Sde Boker	local road
126	צומת חלוקים (Chalukim Junction)		Pebbles	Har Halukim	Route 204
140	צומת טללים (Tlalim Junction)		Dew drops	Tlalim	Route 211
143	צומת משאבים (Mash'abim Junction)		Resources	Mashabei Sadeh	Route 222
152	צומת הנגב (HaNegev Junction)				Route 224 to Yeruham
156	צומת רמת בקע (Ramat Beka Junction)		Rift Hill	Ramat Beka'	local road
159.7	צומת אל-דנפירי (al-Danfiri Junction)			al-Danfiri, al-'Azazme, al-Jarjawi	local road
160	צומת רמת חובב (Ramat Hovav Junction)			Ramat Hovav; Industrial Zone	local road
163	צומת מסעודין אל-עזאזמה (Mas'udin al-Azazme Junction)			al-'Azazme, Abu 'Afash	local road
164.3	צומת תראבין א-צאנע (Tirabin as-Sana Junction)			Tirabin al-Sana	local road
167	צומת אוהלים/הנוקדים (Ohalim/HaNokdim Junction)		Tents/The Shepherds		Route 406
172	מחלף שרה (Sara Interchange)		Sarah	Beer Sheva	Highway 25
176	צומת חטיבת הנגב (Hativat HaNegev Junction)		Negev Brigade	Beer Sheva	Highway 60
184	צומת גורל (Goral Junction)		Destiny		Route 406
191	צומת להבים (Lehavim Junction)		Named after location	near Lehavim	Highway 31; Route 310
197	צומת דבירה (Devira Junction)			Devira, az-Ziadna	Road 3255
200	צומת קמה (Kama Junction)		Named after location	Beit Kama	Route 293
209	צומת מאחז (Ma'ahaz Junction)		Outpost	Mishlat Ma'ahaz	Highway 6
214	צומת אחוזם (Ahuzam Junction)		ult. Ahuzam, son of Asher	Ahuzam	local road
216	צומת איתן (Eitan Junction)		Steadfast	Eitan	Road 3403
218	צומת עוזה (Eitan Junction)		ult. Be Strong	Uza	local road
219	צומת קרית גת דרום (Kiryat Gat Darom)		South Kiryat Gat	Eitan	Road 3403 (Derech HaDarom)
223	צומת פלוגות (Plugot Junction)			Kiryat Gat	Highway 35
226	צומת קוממיות (Kom'miut Junction)				Route 353; Road 3553
228	צומת סגולה (Sgula Junction)		Treasure	Sgula	Road 3553
229	צומת ניר בנים (Nir Banim Junction)		Sons' Meadow	Nir Banim	Road 3613
231	צומת קדמה (Kedma Junction)		Front	Kedma	local road
233	צומת תימורים (Timorim Junction)		Rising	Timorim	local road
236	צומת מלאכי / קסטינה (Malakhi Junction / Kastina)		Angelic / Here we turned	Kiryat Malakhi	Highway 3
237	צומת אחים (Akhim Junction)		Brothers	Kfar Ahim, Talmei Yehiel, Achva; Academic College, Arugot, Yinon, Al-'Azi	local roads
239	צומת ראם / מסמיה (Re'em Junction / Masmiya)		Avraham Mordechai Alter & location of former village	Bnei Re'em	Highway 3
239.3	(northbound only)			Bnei Re'em; Commercial Zone	entrance road
239.9				Berurim (HaZera Genetics; Seed Farm)	entrance road
240.5	צומת ראם צפון (North Re'em Junction)			Bnei Re'em	Oren St.
241.6	צומת חצב (Hatzav Junction)		Drimia	Hatzav	entrance road
243.7	צומת חפץ חיים (Hafetz Haim Junction)		Desirer of life	to Hafetz Haim to Beit Hilkia	Road 3933
244.3	צומת חצור (Hatzor Junction)			Kannot Industrial Park, Bene Ayish	Route 3922
244.8	מחלף גדרה (Gedera Interchange)		presumed biblical location (probably incorrect) ult. hedge fence	Gedera, Kannot	Highway 7
245.4				Gedera	Ben Gurion Blvd.
246.2				Gedera	HaBiluyim St. Tarmah St.
246.7				Gedera	Weizmann Blvd.
247.3				Gedera	Yitzhak Ben-Zvi St.
248.5	צומת תל נוף (Tel Nof Junction)		Named after location	Beit Elazari, Tel Nof Airbase	Road 4103
251.3				Givat Brenner, Kiryat Ekron	Local road King Hassan II St.
252.1	צומת ברנר (Brenner Junction)		Named after location	Givat Brenner, Kiryat Ekron	Route 411; Road 4123
252.4				Kaplan Medical Center	Derech Pasternak
252.9	צומת בילו (Bilu Junction)		Bilu Kibbutz Movement ult. House of Jacob, come let's go	Kfar Bilu, Rehovot	Route 412
255.1	צומת נען (Na'an Junction)			Ganei Hadar, Ramot Meir, Na'an	Road 4233
255.6	צומת רחובות מזרח (Rehovot Mizrach Junction)		East Rehovot	Rehovot	Derech Menachem Begin
256	צומת סתריה (Sitria Junction)		named after Bedouin clan originally in area	Sitria	Shiv'at HaMinim St.
258	צומת ישרש (Yashresh Junction)		(He) will take root	Yashresh	HaYarden St.
259.5	צומת רמלה דרום (Ramla Darom Junction)		South Ramle	Ramle	Route 431
260.1	צומת צומת מצליח (Matzliah Junction)		named after Sahl ben Matzliah	Ramle, Matzliah	Road 4304
260.2				Ramle	Bialik St.
261.1				Ramle	Klausner St.
262.1	מחלף רמלוד (Ramlod Interchange)		Combination of Ramle and Lod	Ramle, Lod	Highway 44
263.5	צומת אחיסמך (Ahisamakh Junction)		Brother of Support	Lod, Ahisamakh	Derech HaRema; Shivat HaMinim St.
264.8	צומת לוד מרכז (Lod Mercaz Junction)		Lod Center	Lod	HaTziyonut Blvd.
267	צומת גינתון (Ginaton Junction)		little garden	Lod, Ginaton, Ben Shemen	Route 443; Dr. Mordechai & Hava; Freeman St.
268.8	צומת לוד צפון (Lod Tzafon Junction)		Lod North	Lod	Route 434 (Abba Hillel Silver St.)
269.2	מחלף לוד (Lod Interchange)			Lod	Highway 1
271.8	צומת אל על (EL AL Junction)		Named after Airline ult. onward, upward	Ben Gurion; International Airport, Airport City	Highway 46; Route 453
272				Ben Gurion; International Airport	Road 4503
273.7	צומת תעשייה אווירית (Ta'asiya Avirit Junction)		Aviation Industry	Israel; Aircraft Industries	local road
274.5				Israel; Aircraft Industries	local road
275.1	צומת בדק (Bedek Junction)		Named after company: Bedek Aviation Group		Road 4613
276	צומת טייסים (Tayasim Junction)		pilots	Bnei Atarot, Yehud	Route 461
278.1	צומת בארות יצחק (Be'erot Yitzhak Junction)		Isaac's Wells	Be'erot Yitzhak	local road
278.6	צומת נופך (Nofekh Junction)		name of stone in the Hoshen	Nofekh, Be'erot Yitzhak Mall	Road 4623
279	צומת מדשימים (Magshimim Junction)		ones who fulfill their dreams	Magshimim	HaTamar St.
279.6	צומת נחלים דרום (Nehalim Darom Junction)		streams south	Nehalim	Snir St.
280.5	צומת נחלים צפון (Nehalim Tzafon Junction)		streams north	Nehalim	Dan St.
280.7	מחלף שעריה (Sha'ariya Interchange)		Named after nearby neighborhood ult.Gates of God	Petah Tikva	Route 471
281.6				Petah Tikva	Hoshea' St.
282.1				Petah Tikva	Shlomo St. Ya'akov Hazan St.
282.7	צומת סירקין (Sirkin Junction)		named after Nachman Sirkin	Petah Tikva, Kfar Sirkin	Ein Ganim St. Road 4713 (Va'ad Arba' Artzot St.)
283.3				Petah Tikva	A. D. Gordon St.
283.6				Petah Tikva	HaVatikim St.
284.3	צומת גנים (Ganim Junction)		named after Ein Ganim ult. gardens	Petah Tikva, Givat HaShlosha	HaRav Herzog St. Route 483 (Rosh HaAyin St.)
285	צומת סגולה (Sgula Junction)		named after nearby commercial district ult. talisman	Petah Tikva	HaYarkonim St.
286.8	צומת הבפטיסטים (HaBaftistim Junction)		The Baptists	Baptist Village, HaYarkonim; Commercial Center, Yarkon National Park, Tel Afek	Natan Shifris St
287.3	מחלף ירקון (Yarkon Interchange)		Named after Yarkon River		Highway 5
288.3	צומת עדנים (Adanim Junction)		pleasures	Adanim, Neve Ne'eman; Industrial Zone	Route 402 (Derech Ramatayim)
289.2				Adanim	local road
289.4				HaSharon South; Regional Council	
289.9	נווה ירק (Neve Yarak Junction)		home of greenery		Road 5112
291.6	צומת אלישמע (Elishama Junction)		ult. named after Elishama, son of Ammihud	Hod HaSharon, Elishama	Mevo Kedem St. HaNarkis St.
293.2	מחלף אלישמע (Elishama Interchange)			Hod HaSharon, Kfar Saba	Route 531
293.6				Kfar Saba, Atir Yeda; Industrial Zone	Atir Yeda St.
294				Kfar Saba	Weizmann St. Highway 55

== See also ==
- List of highways in Israel
