= Latrun Interchange =

Latrun Interchange מחלף לטרון
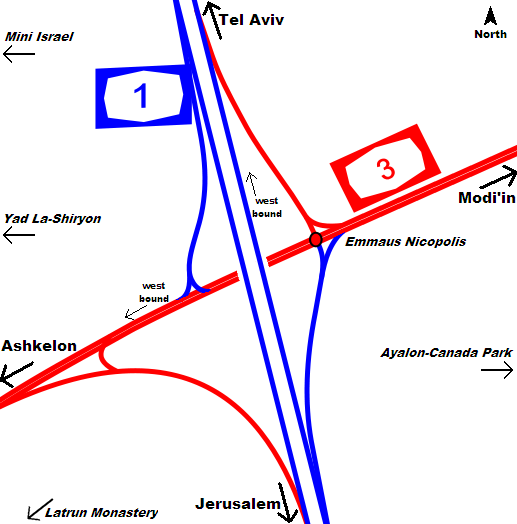
- Map of the interchange

Location
- Latrun, Ayalon Valley
- Coordinates: 31°50′21.2″N 34°59′13.7″E
- Roads at junction: Highway 1 Highway 3

Construction
- Type: Interchange

Latrun Interchange (Hebrew: מחלף לטרון) is a key road interchange of Israel, located in the Latrun Salient in the Israeli occupied West Bank. It lies on the route between Jerusalem and Tel Aviv, at the intersection of Highway 1 and Highway 3.

It is a slightly modified diamond interchange. The high speed ramps of westbound Highway 1 connect with Highway 3 at a traffic-light controlled junction. The high speed ramps of eastbound Highway 1 connect with Highway 3 at two offset, uncontrolled junctions. The interchange lies east of the Green Line within the Latrun Salient, technically part of the West Bank.

== History ==
The name Latrun is ultimately derived from the ruins of a medieval castle. There are two theories regarding the origin of the name. One is that it is a corruption of the French, Le toron des chevaliers (The Castle of the Knights), named by the Crusaders. The other is that it is from the Latin, Domus bonu Latronis (The House of the Good Thief), a name given by 14th century Christian pilgrims after the penitent thief who was crucified by the Romans alongside Jesus (Luke 23:40–43).

Adjacent to the castle ruins is the Latrun Monastery, founded in 1890 by Trappist monks dedicated to Our Lady of the Seven Sorrows. Opposite the monastery off of Highway 3 is Yad La-Shiryon, the Israel Armored Corps Memorial Site and Museum and Mini Israel, an Israel-themed miniature park.

Directly east of the interchange on Highway 3 are the ruins of the ancient Roman city of Emmaus Nicopolis and the former site of Imwas, an Arab village which was destroyed as a result of the Six-Day War. Further east is the 7,000 dunam Ayalon-Canada Park.
