= Kfar Bilu =

Moshav in central Israel

Kfar Bilu: כְּפַר בִּיל״וּ (Hebrew)
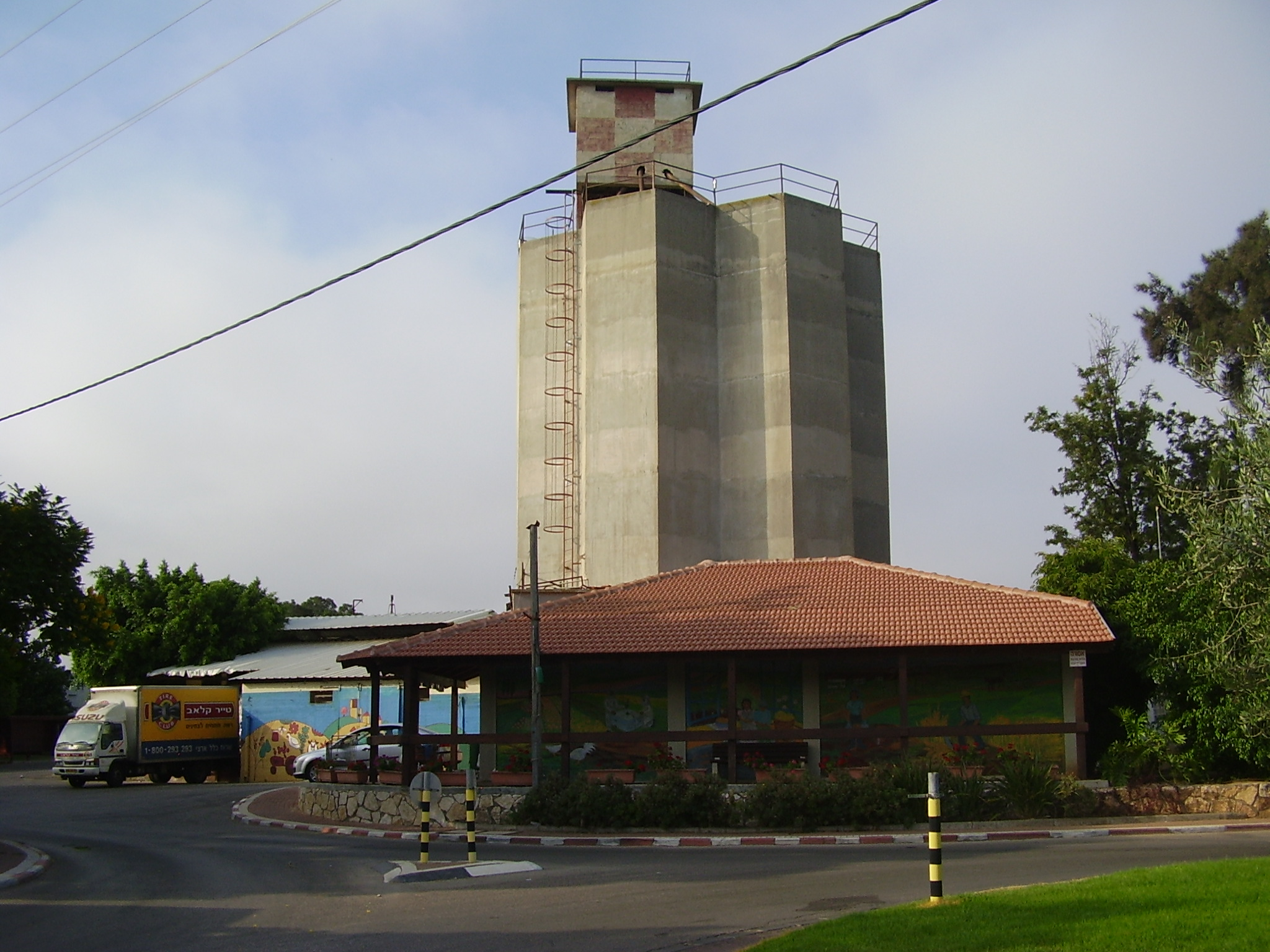

- Location within Central Israel
- Coordinates: 31°52′16″N 34°49′43″E
- Country: Israel
- District: Central
- Subdistrict: Rehovot
- Council: Gezer
- Affiliation: Moshavim Movement
- Founded: 1932
- Founder: "Company of the South"
- Population (2024): 1,210

Kfar Bilu (Hebrew: כְּפַר בִּיל״וּ, lit. 'Bilu Village') is a moshav in central Israel. Located between Rehovot and Kiryat Ekron, it falls under the jurisdiction of Gezer Regional Council. In 2024 it had a population of 1,210.

== History ==
The moshav was founded in 1932 as part of the Settlement of the Thousand plan by a group of workers known as the "Company of the South" (Hebrew: חבורת הדרום, Havurat HaDarom), who had assembled in Rehovot. Its name commemorated fifty years since the first aliyah of Bilu members.

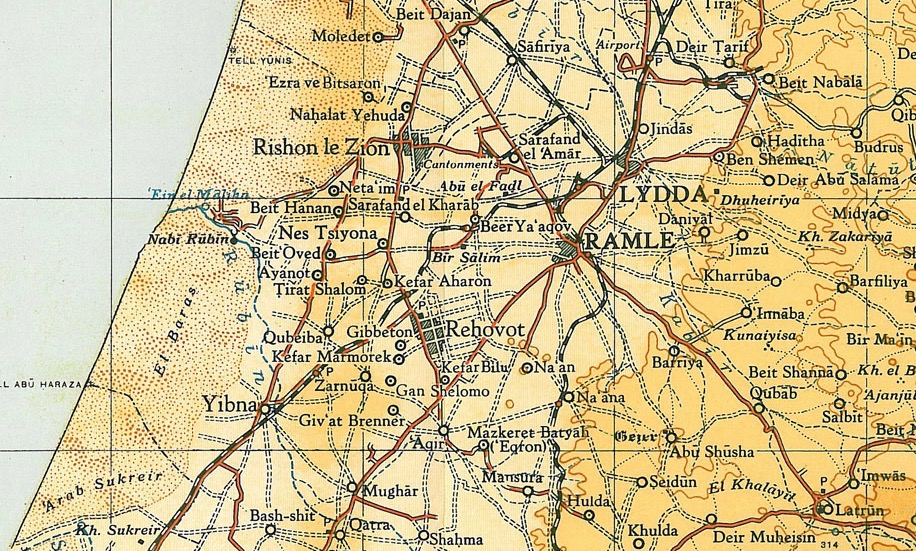
Kfar Bilu 1945 1:250,000 (South of Rehovot)

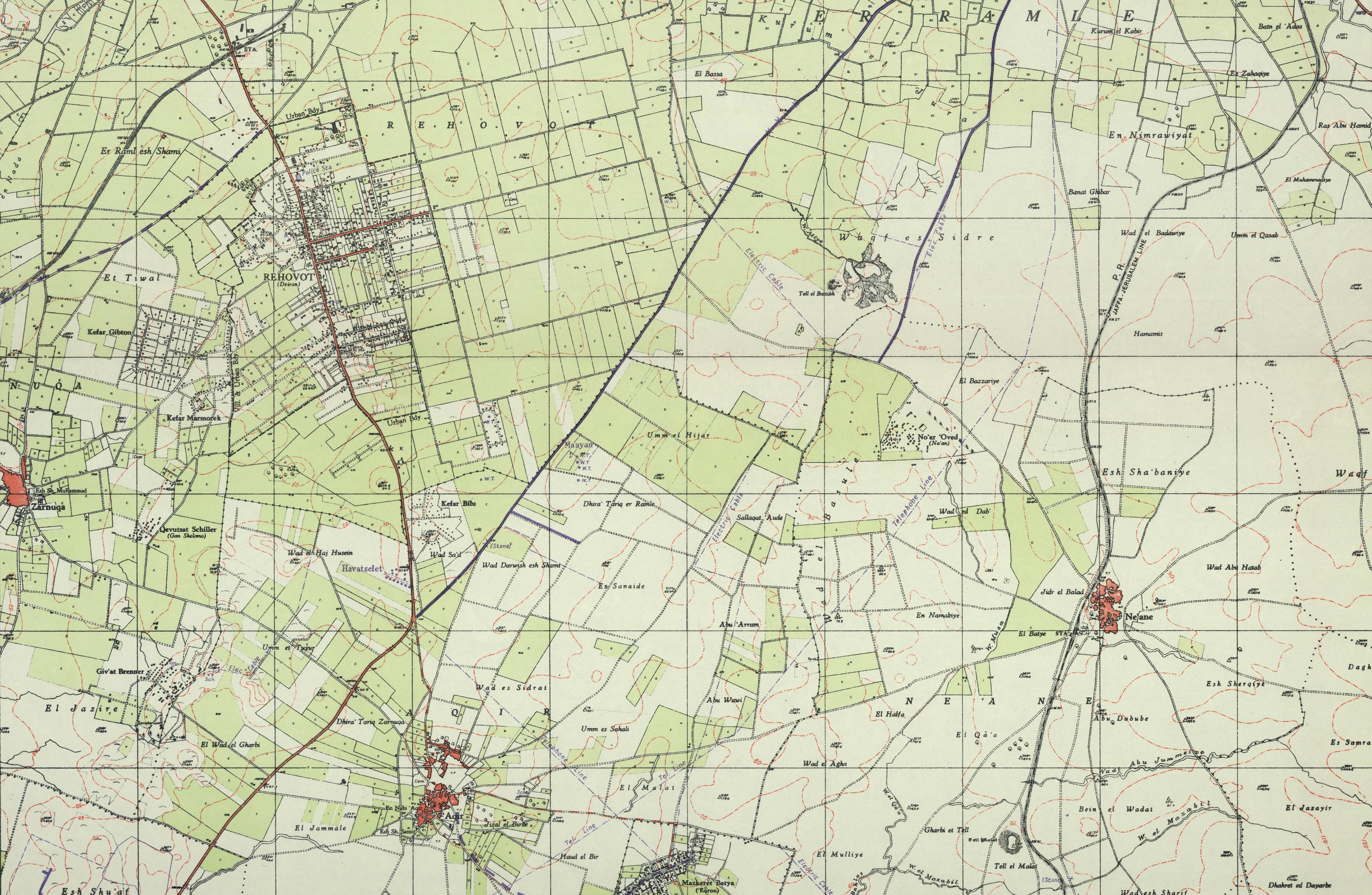
Kfar Bilu 1948 1:20,000
