= Malakhi Junction =

Road junction in Israel

Malakhi Junction צומת מלאכי
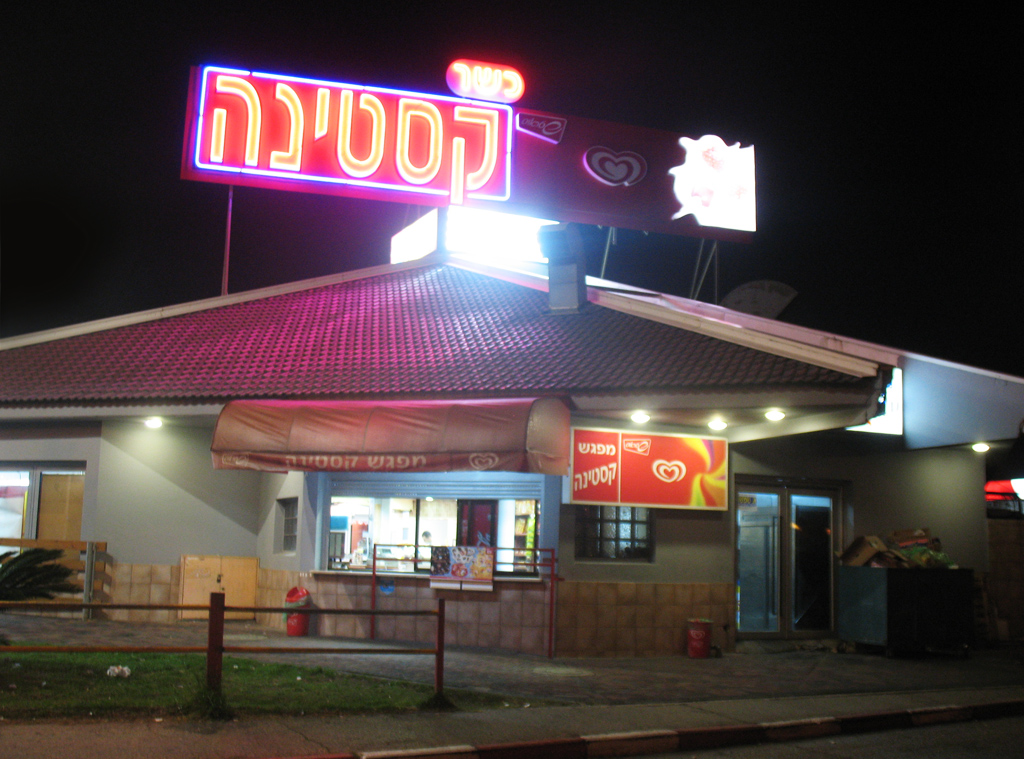
- Restaurant with the famous Qastina sign (after renovation)
- Interactive map of Malakhi Junction צומת מלאכי

Location
- Southern Israel
- Coordinates: 31°43′54.67″N 34°45′24.53″E
- Roads at junction: Highway 40; Highway 3

Construction
- Type: Intersection

The Malakhi Junction (Hebrew: צומת מלאכי), also known as Qastina (Hebrew: קסטינה) for the Palestinian village which once stood there, is a major road junction in Israel, between Highway 40 and 3. It is located on the 37th kilometer of Highway 3.

Like most junctions in Israel, it serves as a major transportation hub and has a trempiada, or hitchhiking stand. Due to its proximity to Kiryat Malakhi, it is also sometimes considered Kiryat Malakhi's central bus station, operated by the Be'er Tuvia Regional Council. In that capacity however, it has been often criticized, to the point that Ynet uses a photo of the bus stations in Qastina as a stock photo for public transportation critiques. In a March 2007 survey, Ynet gave Qastina a 0/10 rating (the lowest) out of 11 bus station checked nationwide. On March 1, 2008, the Israeli Channel 2 ran a similar survey, ranking Qastina lowest, with 0/3 on its three main criteria.

In addition, the junction is a common stop for Israelis traveling between the north/center of the country (Haifa, Tel Aviv) to the south (Beersheba, Eilat), a fact that helps maintain several fast food and other small stores. The junction has a Better Place battery replacement station.

During the October 2000 protests, Palestinian citizens burned tires and threw rocks at passing buses at the junction.

== Bus lines ==
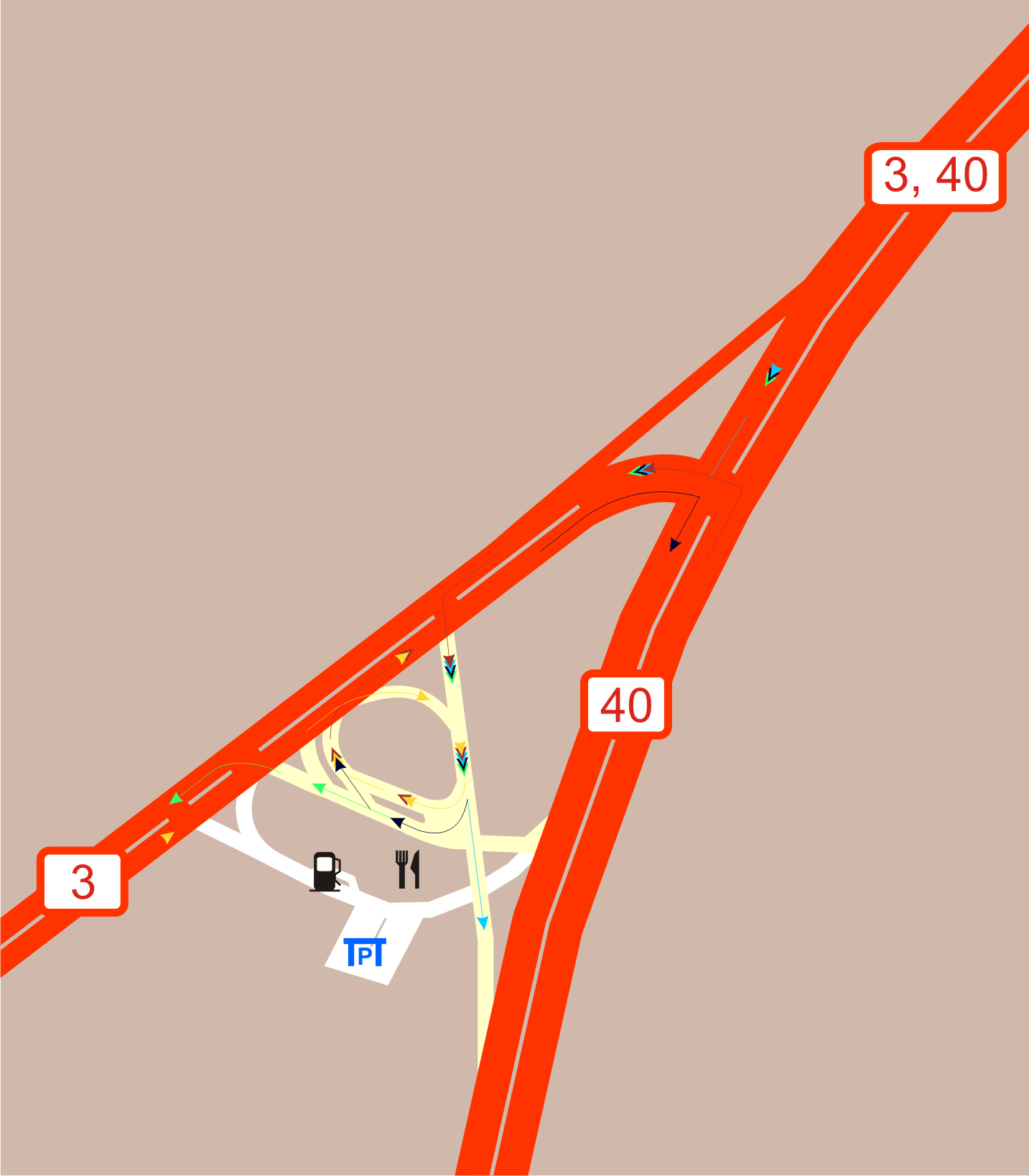
Road map of the junction, showing the bus movement

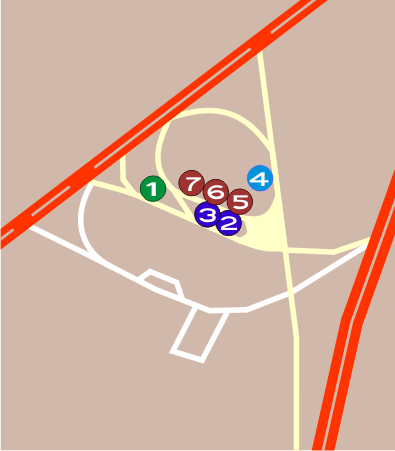
Map showing the locations of bus stations on the junction

Following is a list of bus lines which stop in the junction's terminal.

Line	Route	Via	Company
31	Kiryat Malakhi - Ashkelon CBS	Ashkelon Railway Station	Egged
140	Kiryat Malakhi – Ashdod CBS	Beer Tuvia regional council	Afikim
141	Kiryat Malakhi – Ashdod CBS	Beer Tuvia regional council	Afikim
142	Kiryat Malakhi – Ashdod CBS	Azrikam	Afikim
301	Tel Aviv CBS – Ashkelon CBS	Rishon LeZion old CBS, Rehovot CBS, Gedera CBS, Malakhi Junction, Kiryat Gat CBS	Egged
310	Tel Aviv CBS – Ashkelon CBS	Yavne CBS, Malakhi Junction, Kiryat Gat CBS	Egged
348	Ashdod CBS – Beersheba CBS	Malakhi Junction, Kiryat Gat CBS	Metropoline
367	Rishon LeZion CBS – Beersheba CBS	Rehovot CBS, Gedera CBS, Malakhi Junction, Kiryat Gat CBS	Metropoline
369	Tel Aviv CBS – Beersheba CBS	Yavne CBS, Malakhi Junction, Kiryat Gat CBS	Metropoline
371	Rishon LeZion CBS – Beersheba CBS	Rehovot CBS, Gedera CBS, Malakhi Junction, Kiryat Gat CBS	Metropoline
376	Kiryat Malakhi – Tze'elim	Gedera CBS, Malakhi Junction, Kiryat Gat CBS, Ofakim	Dan BaDarom
390	Tel Aviv CBS - Eilat CBS	Malakhi Junction	Egged
393	Tel Aviv CBS – Eilat CBS	Rishon LeZion CBS, Rehovot CBS, Gedera CBS, Malakhi Junction, Beersheba CBS, Dimona CBS	Egged
437	Jerusalem CBS – Ashkelon CBS	Malakhi Junction	Egged
443	Jerusalem CBS – Netivot	Malakhi Junction, Sderot	Egged
446	Jerusalem CBS – Beersheba CBS	Malakhi Junction, Kiryat Gat CBS	Egged
449	Ofakim – Jerusalem CBS^{1 2}	Kiryat Gat CBS – Malakhi Junction	Egged
991	Eilat CBS – Haifa Hof HaCarmel CBS^{1}	Netanya CBS, Hadera CBS	Egged

^{1} – stops in the terminal in one direction only
^{2} – Sundays only

== Road accidents ==
In the beginning of 2010, Ayelet Malko suffered fatal injuries after being run over while crossing the junction. This contributed to a decision to build a pedestrian bridge in the area, which was planned to have been completed by the end of 2010.

== Plans ==
The National Roads Company of Israel approved 500 million NIS to upgrade the junction to an interchange.

== See also ==
- Transportation in Israel
