= Kiryat Malakhi =

Kiryat Malakhi קריית מלאכי
- City

Hebrew transcription(s)
  - ISO 259: Qiryat Malˀaki
  - Also spelled: Kiryat Malachi (official); Qiryat Mal'akhi (unofficial)
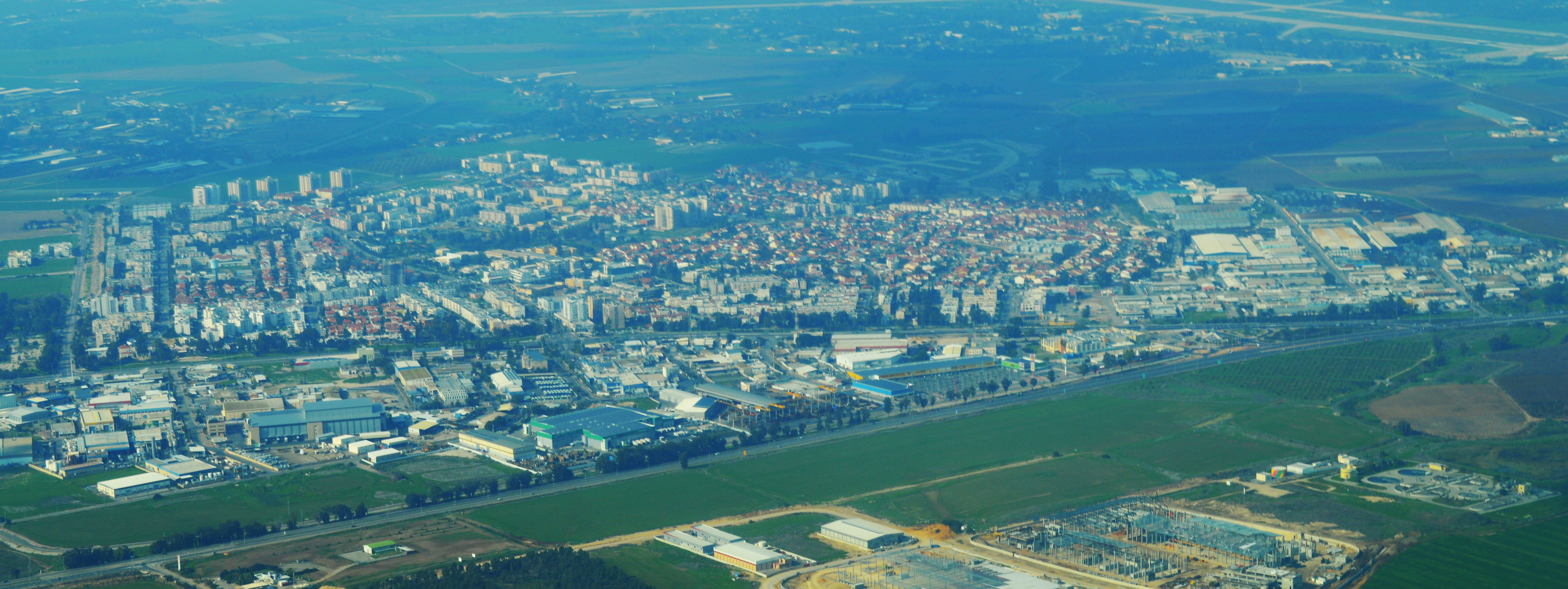
- View of Kiryat Malakhi

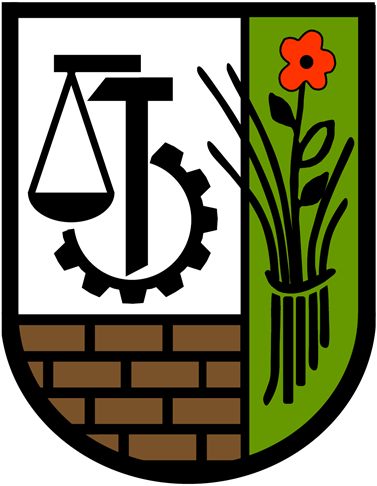
- Coat of arms

- Location within Ashkelon region of Israel Location within Israel
- Coordinates: 31°43′45″N 34°44′46″E
- Country: Israel
- District: Southern
- Subdistrict: Ashkelon
- Natural Region: Malakhi
- Founded: 1951

Government
  - Mayor: Eliyahu "Lalu" Zohar

Area
  - Total: 4,632 dunams (4.632 km^{2}; 1.788 sq mi)

Population (2024)
  - Total: 27,959
  - Density: 6,036/km^{2} (15,630/sq mi)

Ethnicity
  - Jews and others: 99.6%
  - Arabs: 0.4%
- Name meaning: City of Angels
- Website: www.k-m.org.il

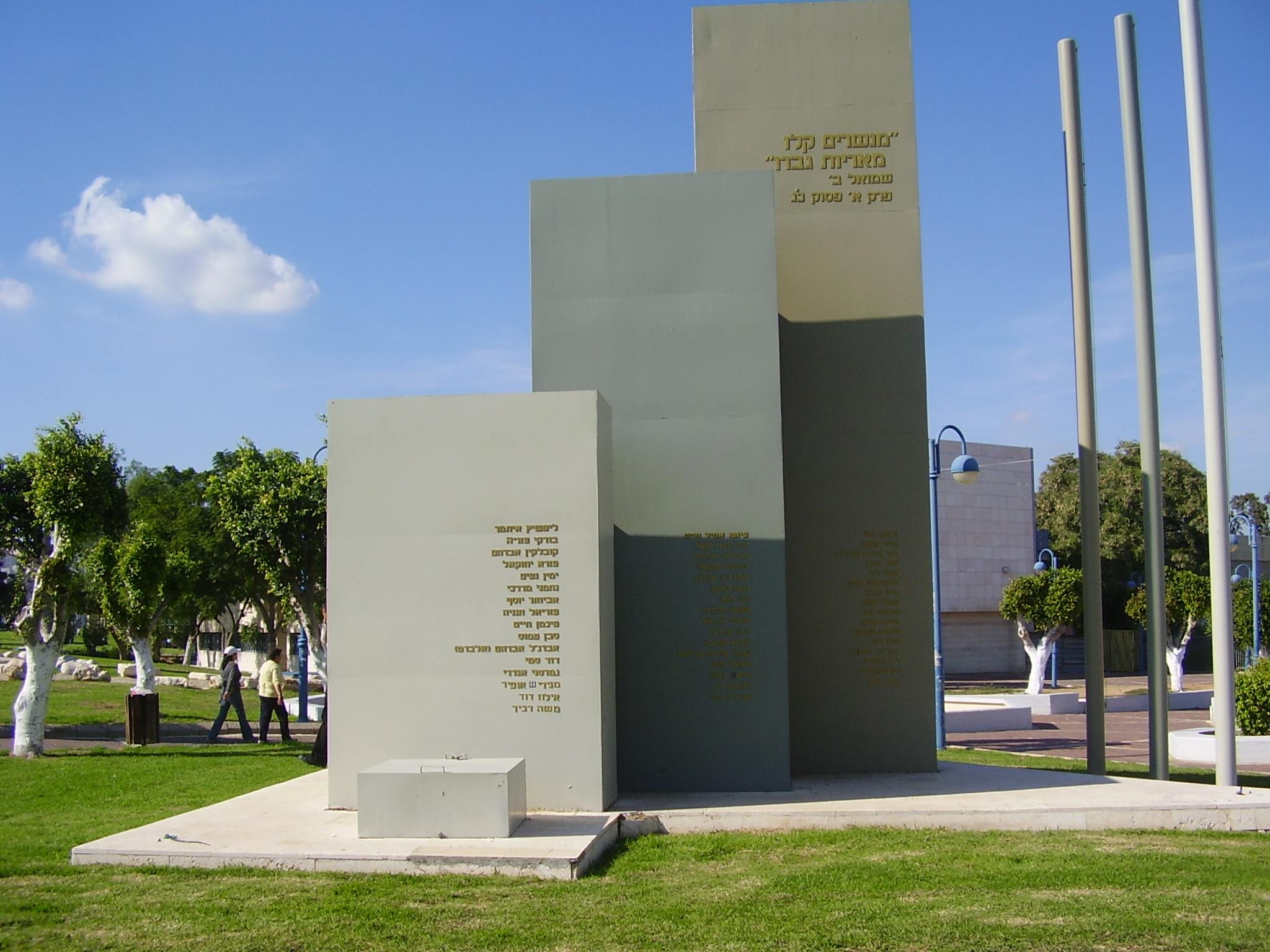
An Israel Defense Forces (IDF) memorial for fallen troops at Kiryat Malakhi

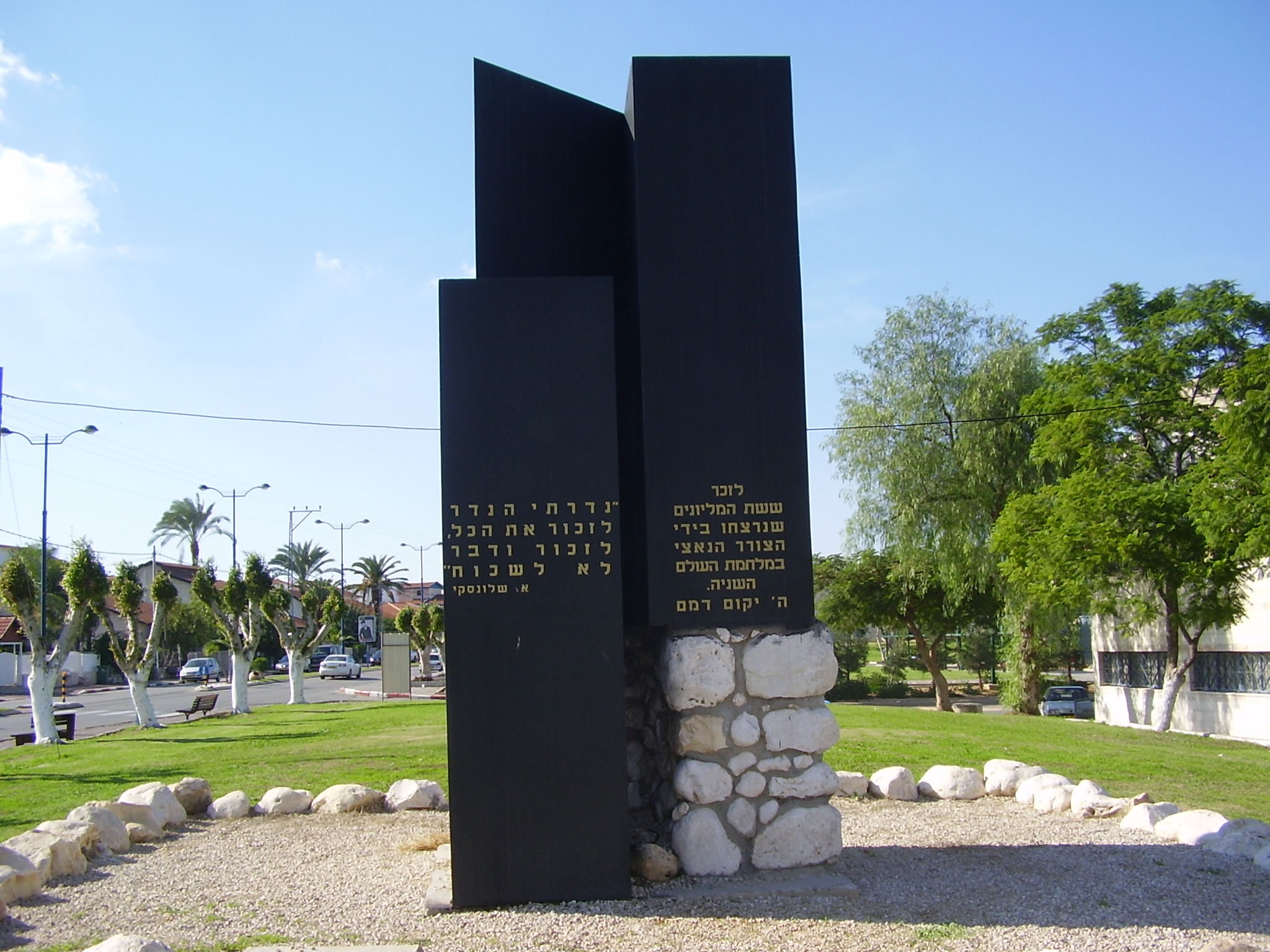
The Holocaust Memorial at a city park

Kiryat Malakhi (Hebrew: קריית מלאכי, lit. 'City of Angels', Arabic: كريات ملأخي) also spelled Kiryat Malahi, Kiryat Malachi, or Qiryat Mal'akhi, is a city in the Southern District of Israel, 17 kilometres (11 mi) northeast of Ashkelon. In 2024 it had a population of 27,959. Its jurisdiction is 4,632 dunams (~4.6 km^{2}).

== History ==
=== Qastina ===
Before the establishment of Kiryat Malakhi, the Palestinian village of Qastina stood two kilometers to the west. Qastina's population in 1945 was 890, and its economy was largely agricultural. During the 1948 Arab-Israeli War, on July 9th, 1948, Qastina was assaulted by the Giv'ati Brigade and subsequently depopulated according to recommendations from command.

=== Establishment of Kiryat Malakhi ===
Kiryat Malakhi was established in 1951 as a ma'abara (lit. 'temporary residential'), to house the masses of Jewish immigrants who arrived during the early years of the newly established State of Israel, many of them part of the Jewish exodus from Arab and Muslim countries. The name was chosen to honor the Jewish community of Los Angeles, which contributed much of the funding for its establishment.

Moshe Katsav, later Israel's 8th president, was elected mayor in 1969, at the age of 24. His younger brother Lior Katsav has also been a mayor of Kiryat Malakhi; whilst Yosef Vanunu held the post from 1981 until the 1990s. The current mayor is Eliyahu "Lalu" Zohar.

On 15 November 2012 missile attacks were launched by Palestinian militant groups from the Gaza Strip as a response to Israel's Operation Pillar of Defense. These attacks resulted in the deaths of three residents of the city.

== Demographics ==
Historical population
Year	Pop.	±%
1972	9,200	—
1983	11,800	+28.3%
1995	18,800	+59.3%
2008	20,500	+9.0%
2022	26,362	+28.6%
2024	27,957	+6.1%

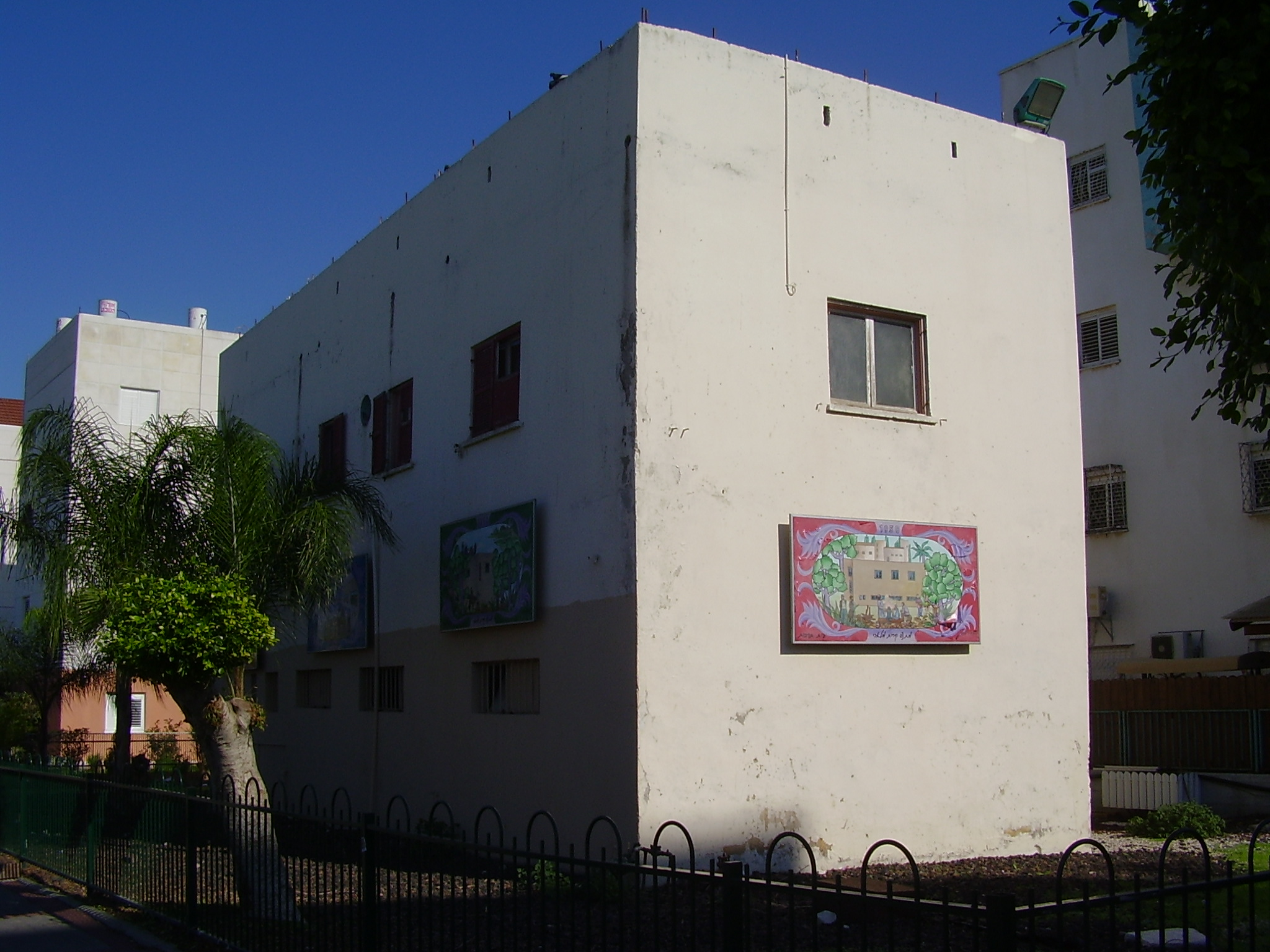
The historical founders' Pomborovski House (a.k.a. Beit HaRishonim)

The arrival of new immigrants from the former Soviet Union as well as from Ethiopia in a few previous decades, has increased the population of Kiryat Malakhi by 40 percent. Some 22,000 people now reside in the city. In January 2012, Israeli television publicized a case of a seller in the municipality creating a restrictive covenant barring the sale or lease of property to Ethiopian Jews. The case led to public outcry and demonstrations of hundreds of people, and caused the Association for Civil Rights in Israel to call on the Registrar of Real Estate to revoke the licence of real estate agents who practice such discrimination. At the south end of the city, a Chabad neighborhood, Nachalat Har Chabad, is home to 2800 residents. Next to it, a new neighborhood called Karmei HaNadiv is developing, with many high-rises being built to accommodate young families and professionals. Karmei Hanadiv is centered around Sderot Rothschild a high-end commercial promenade.

== Sports ==
There is a 1,000-seat football (soccer) stadium named Teddy Arena, being held as the home-grounds for the local association club of Maccabi Kiryat Malakhi.

== Transportation ==
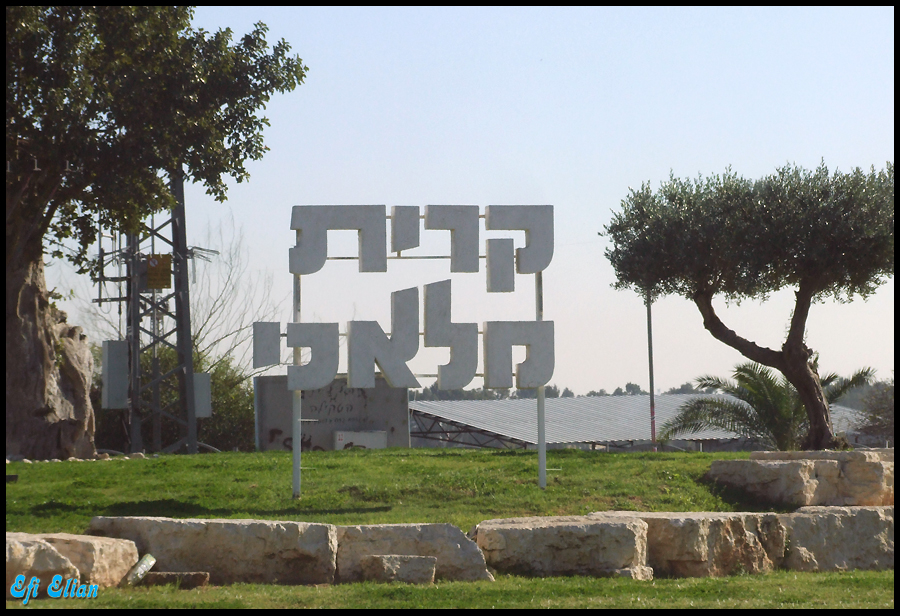
South entrance to Kiryat Malakhi

The city's main transportation hub is the Malakhi Junction (also known as Qastina).

== Education ==
According to CBS, there are 15 schools and 4,909 students in the city. They are spread out as 10 elementary schools and 2,867 elementary school students, and 2 high schools and 2,042 high school students.

== Voting Patterns ==
In the 2022 election, 88 percent of voters in Kiryat Malakhi voted for the parties of the right-wing coalition led by Benjamin Netanyahu, while 10 percent voted for the parties of the center-left coalition led by Yair Lapid and 0.1 percent voted for the Arab parties.

In the 2026 election, 85 percent of voters in Kiryat Malakhi voted for the parties of the right-wing coalition led by Benjamin Netanyahu, while 10 percent voted for the parties of the center-left coalition led by Gadi Eisenkot and 0.1 percent voted for the Arab parties. An additional 2.9 percent voted for the Reservists, and 1.1 percent voted for Amcha Yisrael. Voter turnout increased 15 percent from the 2022 election.

== Twin towns – sister cities ==
Kiryat Malakhi is twinned with:

- Piatra Neamț, Romania
- Rueil-Malmaison, France (since 1985)
- Golmud, China
