= Lakhish Natural Region =

Coordinates: 31°36′37″N 34°46′20″E

- Natural Region
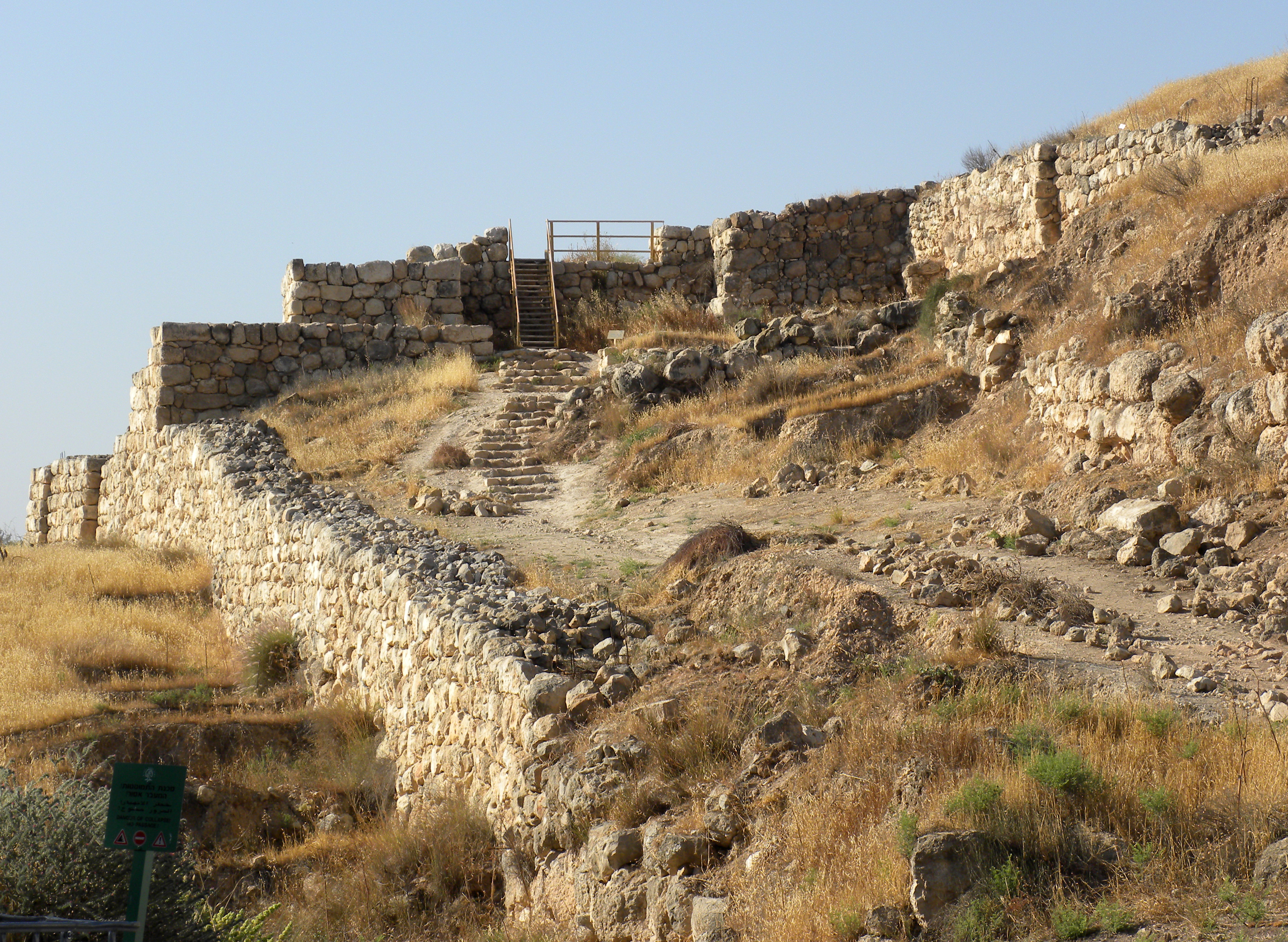
- Tel Lakhish, namesake of the Lakhish Natural Region
- Country: Israel
- District: Southern
- Subdistrict: Ashkelon
- Largest City: Kiryat Gat

Area
  - Total: 484 km^{2} (187 sq mi)

Population (2024)
  - Total: 94,037

Ethnicity
  - Jews and others: 95.1%
  - Arabs: 0.2%

The Lakhish Natural Region is a natural region in the Ashkelon Subdistrict, in the Southern District of Israel. Kiryat Gat is the largest city in the natural region.

== Geography ==
Districts, Subdistricts and Natural Regions of the State of Israel, 2018

The natural region consists of a portion of south-central Israel, east of Ashkelon, north of Rahat, and stretching to the Green Line. It is named after Tel Lakhish, an ancient Israelite city that is now an archaeological site and national park. It has an area of 484 km^{2}. The largest city in the natural region is Kiryat Gat, which contains 77 percent of the natural region's population. There are no other localities in the natural region with more than 2,500 people. The natural region contains portions of the Lakhish, Shafir, and Yoav regional councils.

== Demographics ==
The vast majority of the residents of the Lakhish Natural Region are Jewish. There are no Arab towns in the natural region.

Historical population
Year	Pop.	±%
1972	28,200	—
1983	34,800	+23.4%
1995	51,600	+48.3%
2008	58,900	+14.1%
2022	83,723	+42.1%
2024	94,037	+12.3%

== Administrative local authorities ==
Cities	Local Councils	Villages
Kiryat Gat	[None]	Lakhish: Ahuzam; Amatzia; Bnei Dekalim; Eliav; Karmei Katif; Lakhish; Nehora; Neta; Nir Hen; Noga; Otzem; Sde David; Sde Moshe; Shahar; Shekef; Tlamim; Tzohar; Yad Natan; Shafir: Eitan; Even Shmuel; No'am; Revaha; Shalva; Uza; Yoav: Beit Guvrin; Beit Nir

== Voting Patterns ==
In the 2022 election, 73 percent of voters in the natural region voted for the parties of the right-wing coalition led by Benjamin Netanyahu, while 25 percent voted for the parties of the center-left coalition led by Yair Lapid and 0.1 percent voted for the Arab parties.

In the 2026 election, 71 percent of voters in the natural region voted for the parties of the right-wing coalition led by Benjamin Netanyahu, while 23 percent voted for the parties of the center-left coalition led by Gadi Eisenkot and 0.1 percent voted for the Arab parties. An additional 2.8 percent voted for the Reservists, and 1.8 percent voted for Amcha Yisrael. Voter turnout increased 19 percent from the 2022 election.
