= Zohar, Israel =

Moshav in southern Israel

Zohar: זוהר, זֹהַר (Hebrew); زوهر (Arabic)
- Etymology: Brightness
- Location within Ashkelon region of Israel
- Coordinates: 31°35′43″N 34°41′32″E
- Country: Israel
- District: Southern
- Subdistrict: Ashkelon
- Council: Lakhish
- Affiliation: Agricultural Union
- Founded: 1956
- Founder: Algerian and Tunisian Jews
- Population (2024): 387

Zohar (Hebrew: זֹהַר, lit. Brightness) is a moshav in southern Israel. Located near the city of Kiryat Gat, it falls under the jurisdiction of Lakhish Regional Council. In 2024 it had a population of 387.

A large lake that serves as a reservoir lies near the town.

== History ==
The moshav was founded in 1956 by Jewish refugees from Algeria and Tunisia, as part of the effort to settle Hevel Lakhish. It was established on the lands of the former depopulated Arab villages of al-Faluja and Burayr.
