= Shahar, Israel =

Shahar: שַׁחַר (Hebrew); شاحر (Arabic)

Hebrew transcription(s)
  - Unofficial: Shachar
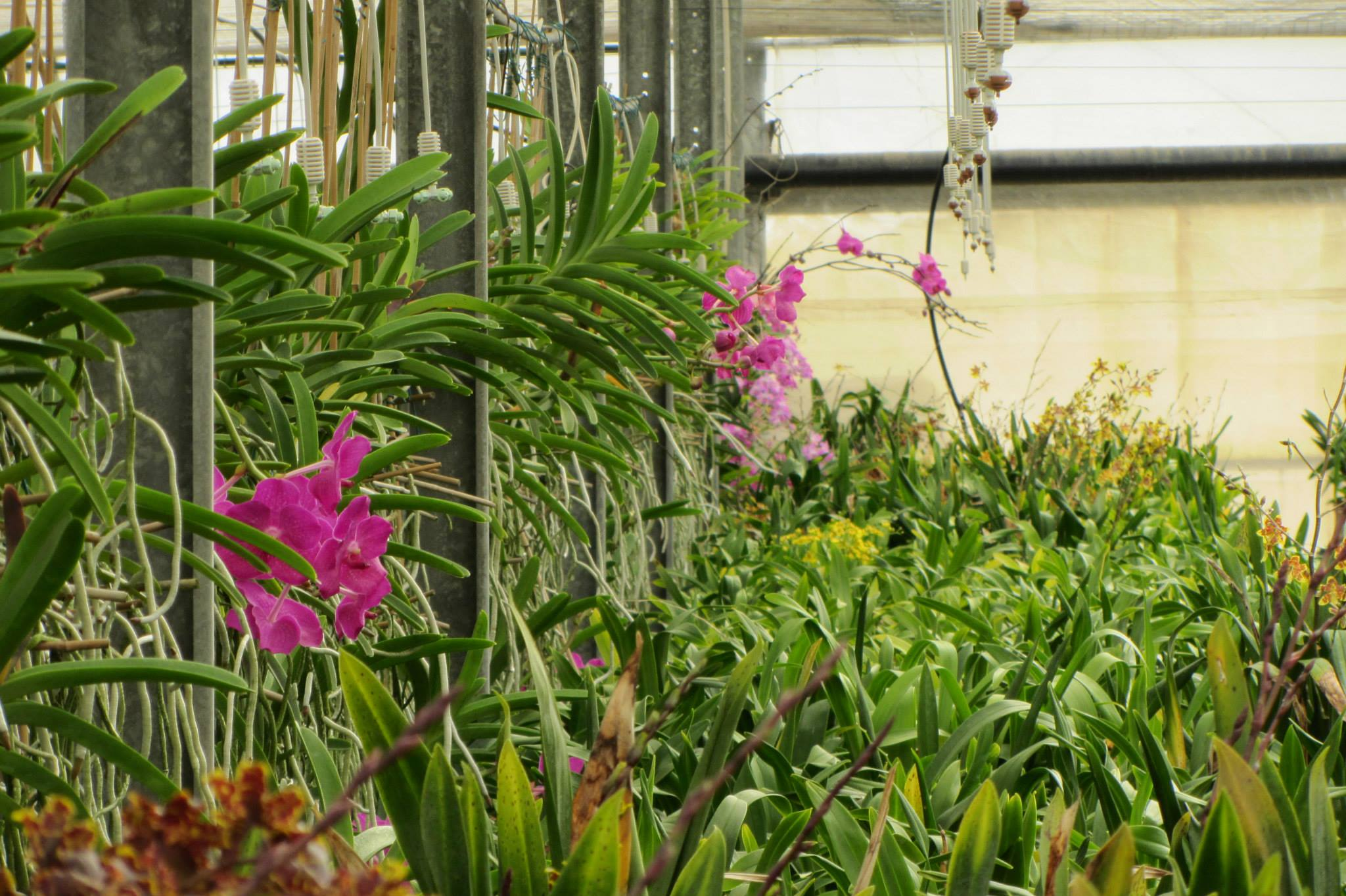
- Etymology: Dawn
- Location within Ashkelon region of Israel Location within Israel
- Coordinates: 31°37′7″N 34°43′27″E
- Country: Israel
- District: Southern
- Subdistrict: Ashkelon
- Council: Lakhish
- Affiliation: Moshavim Movement
- Founded: 1955
- Founder: North African Jewish and Indian-Jewish immigrants
- Population (2024): 890

Shahar (Hebrew: שַׁחַר, lit. "Dawn") is a moshav in south-central Israel. Located about three kilometres west of Kiryat Gat and one kilometre east of Nir Hen, it falls under the jurisdiction of Lakhish Regional Council. In 2024 it had a population of 890.

== History ==
The moshav was founded in 1955 by Jewish immigrants from North Africa and Jewish immigrants from India, as part of the program to populate the area. It was founded on land of the depopulated Palestinian village of al-Faluja. Its name symbolizes the dawn of Zionist settlement in Hevel Lakhish.

The main industry that they developed was growing flowers for export, an enterprise which, despite the harsh desert climate, grew and prospered. One of Shahar's leading businessmen, Eliahu Bezalel, won the Kaplan Prize in 1994 and then the Pravasi Bharatiya Divas (an award for Non-Resident Indians), in recognition of these achievements.
