= Nehora =

Community settlement in southern Israel

Nehora: נְהוֹרָה (Hebrew)
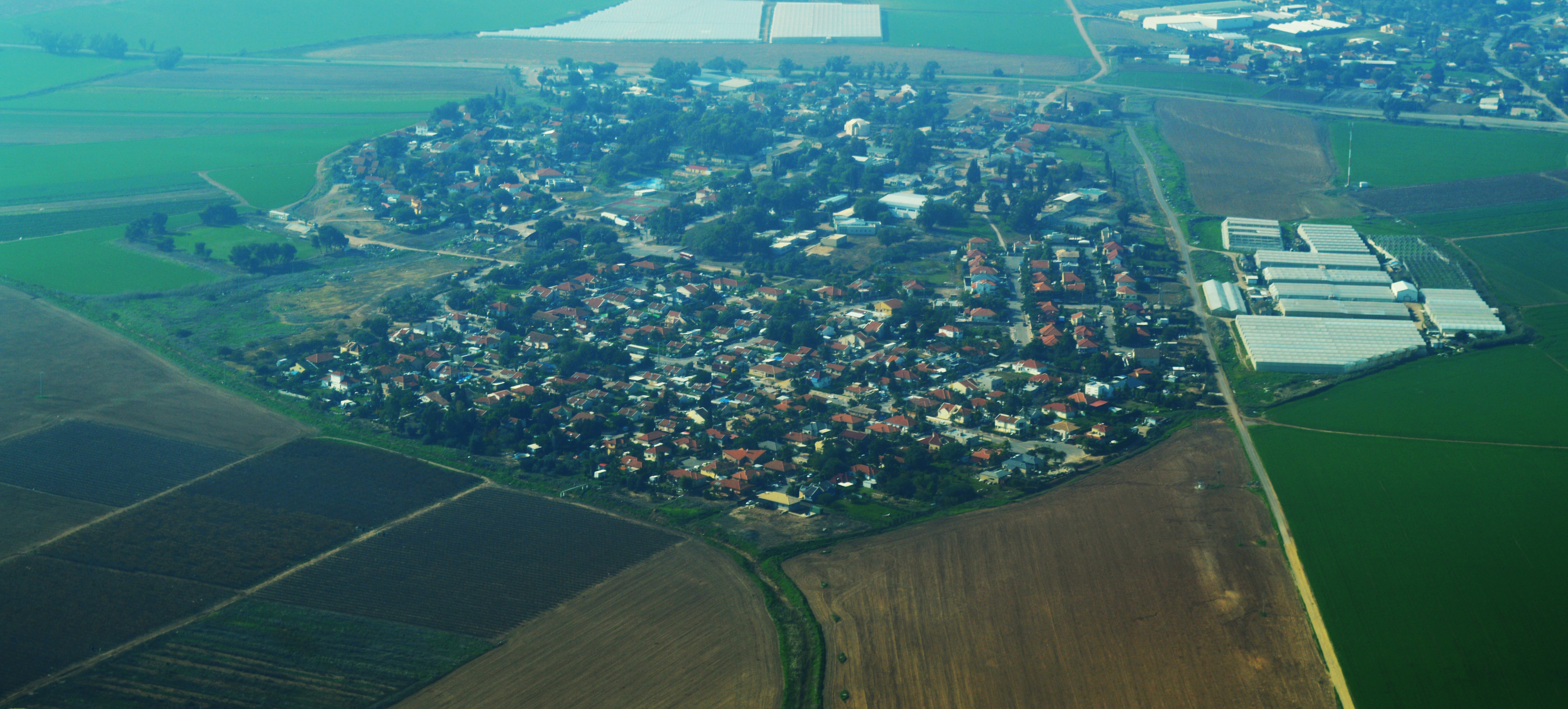

- Location within Israel Location within Ashkelon region of Israel
- Coordinates: 31°37′21″N 34°42′18″E
- Country: Israel
- District: Southern
- Subdistrict: Ashkelon
- Council: Lakhish
- Founded: 1955
- Population (2024): 1,297

Nehora (Hebrew: נהורה) is a community settlement in southern Israel. Located on the coastal plain about 5 km west Kiryat Gat in south-central Israel and just to the east of Route 352, across the road from Noga, it falls under the jurisdiction of Lakhish Regional Council. In 2024 it had a population of 1,297.

== History ==
Nehora was founded in 1955 as part of the program to inhabit Hevel Lakhish and was intended to serve as a center of services for surrounding communities. A shopping center, regional school and the offices of the Lakhish Regional Council are located there.

It is built at a site near the former depopulated Palestinian villages of Karatiyya and al-Faluja.
