= Karatiyya =

Karatiyya كرتيا Karatayya, Karatiya, Qaratiyya
- Etymology: "Thick, tangled grass" (possibly)
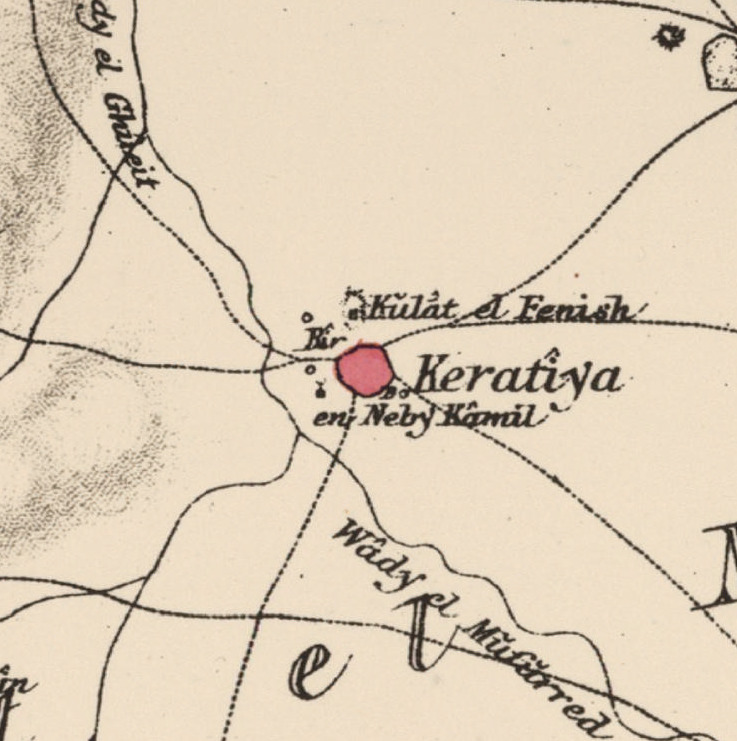
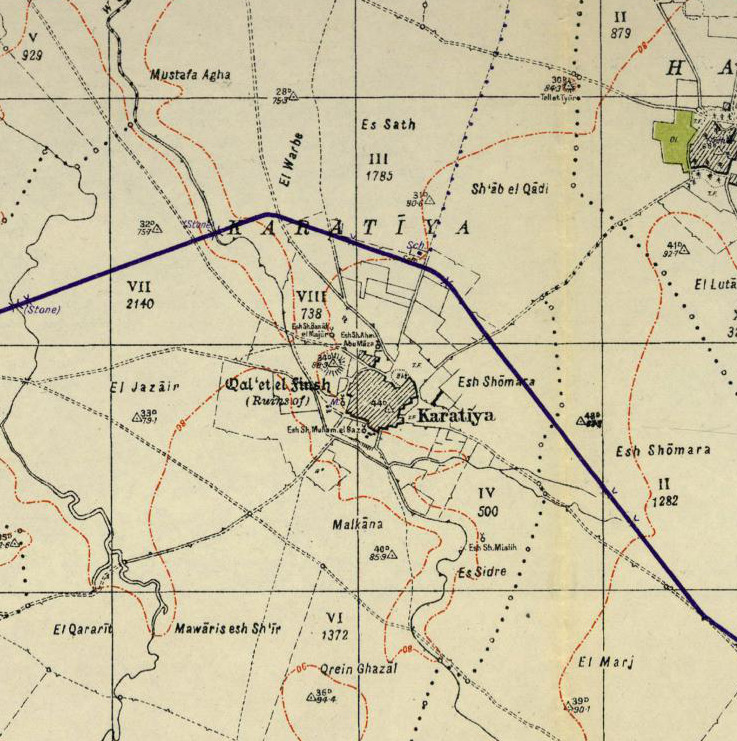
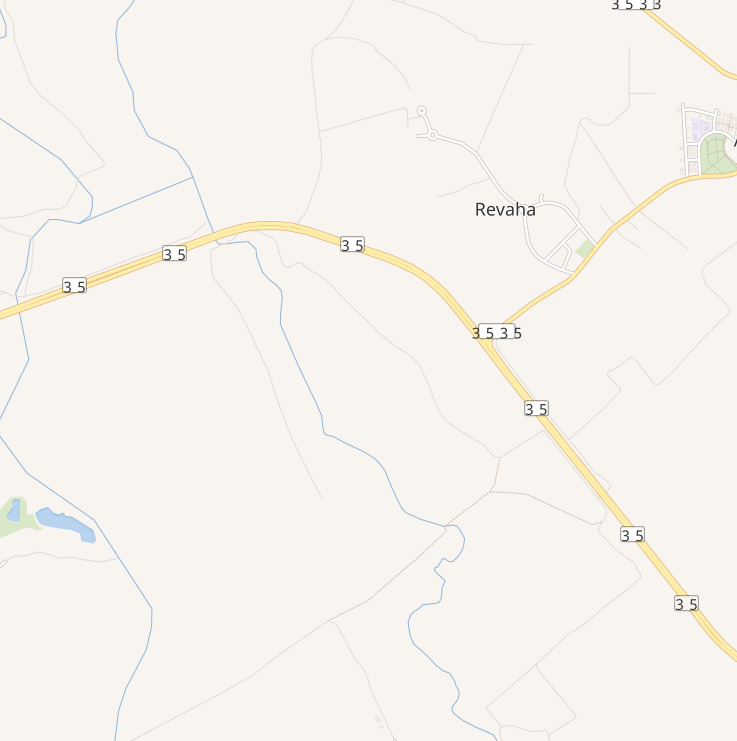
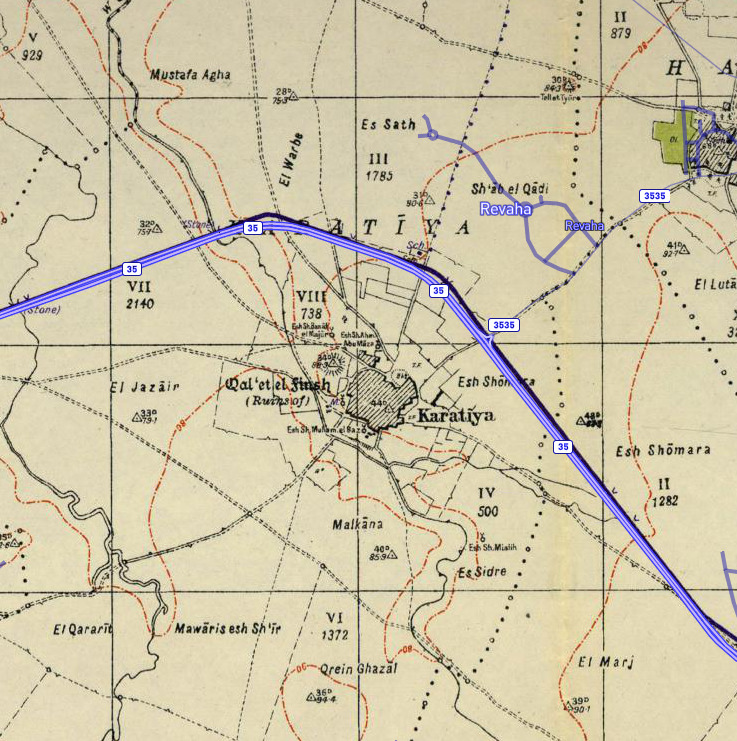
- 1870s map 1940s map modern map 1940s with modern overlay map A series of historical maps of the area around Karatiyya (click the buttons)

- Location within Mandatory Palestine
- Coordinates: 31°38′37″N 34°43′33″E
- Palestine grid: 124/116
- Geopolitical entity: Mandatory Palestine
- Subdistrict: Gaza
- Date of depopulation: 17–18 July 1948

Area
  - Total: 13,709 dunams (13.709 km^{2}; 5.293 sq mi)

Population (1945)
  - Total: 1,370
- Cause(s) of depopulation: Military assault by Yishuv forces
- Current Localities: Komemiyut, Revaha, Nehora

Karatiyya (Arabic: كرتيا) was a Palestinian Arab village of 1,370, located 29 kilometers (18 mi) northeast of Gaza, situated in a flat area with an elevation of 100 meters (330 ft) along the coastal plain of Palestine and crossed by Wadi al-Mufrid.

== History ==
Byzantine ceramics have been found here.

In the 12th century, a castle called Galatie was built on the village site by the Crusaders, it was subsequently captured by the Ayyubids under Saladin in 1187, and destroyed in September 1191.

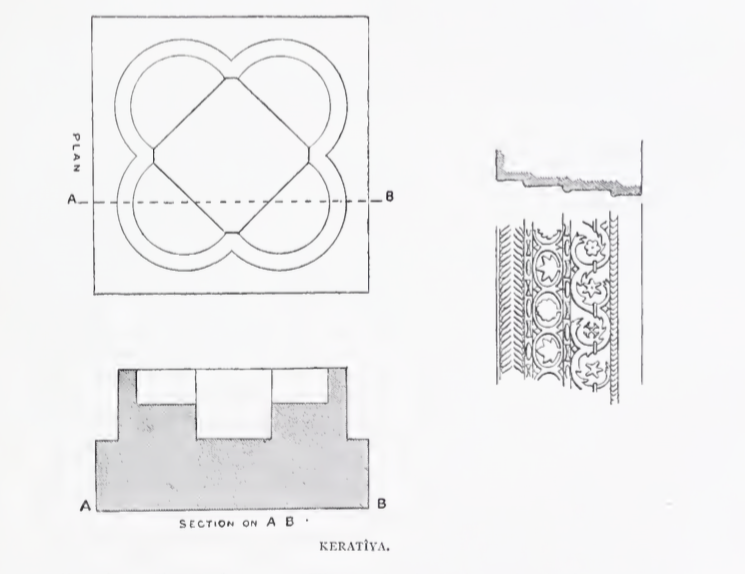
Font, with decorations

The place called Kulat el Fenish by the village was apparently once a church. The remains were seen in 1875: "The tower on the mound is called Kulat el Fenish. It is a solid block of masonry, standing some 20 or 30 feet in height. Near it lie shafts and bases of white marble, and an elaborate cornice, well and deeply cut. There is also a font, like that at Beit 'Auwa (Sheet XXI.), formed by four intersecting circles, and measuring 37 feet along the diameter, and 2 feet high."

In 1226, Arab geographer Yaqut al-Hamawi writes of the village under Ayyubid rule as "Karatayya" as "a town near Bait Jibrin, in the Province of Filastin. It belongs to Jerusalem."

The Mamluk sultan al-Nasir ibn Qalawun camped in Karatayya in 1299 on his way to fight the Mongols. 14th-century Arab geographer Al-Dimashqi reports that at times it was a part of Mamlakat Ghazzah ("Kingdom of Gaza").

=== Ottoman era ===
Karatiyya was incorporated into the Ottoman Empire in 1517 with the rest of Palestine, and by the 1596 tax records it was named Karta, a village in the nahiya of Gaza, part of Sanjak of Gaza. It had a population of 46 Muslim households, an estimated 253 persons. The villagers paid a fixed tax rate of 33.3% on various agricultural products, including wheat, barley, fruit, vineyards, beehives, and goats; a total of 5,830 akçe.

During the 17th and 18th centuries, the area of Karatiyya experienced a significant process of settlement decline due to nomadic pressures on local communities. The residents of abandoned villages moved to surviving settlements, but the land continued to be cultivated by neighboring villages.

In 1838 Edward Robinson noted it as Kuratiyeh, a Muslim village in the Gaza district. He further noted a ruined tower of "modern" date, built partly of (adobe) bricks; and a few ancient columns lying about.

In 1863 Victor Guérin found it to be a small village with many houses demolished. To the north of this hamlet, on a nearby hill, were huge sections of walls and the remains of a square tower, three-quarters destroyed, called "El-Kala'", or "the Castle". South of the village was a maqām, decorated with two ancient grey-white marble columns. An Ottoman village list of about 1870 indicated 73 houses and a population of 196, though the population count included men, only.

In the 19th century, a ruined tower stood atop a mound just outside the village which was built in an open plain.

=== British Mandate era ===
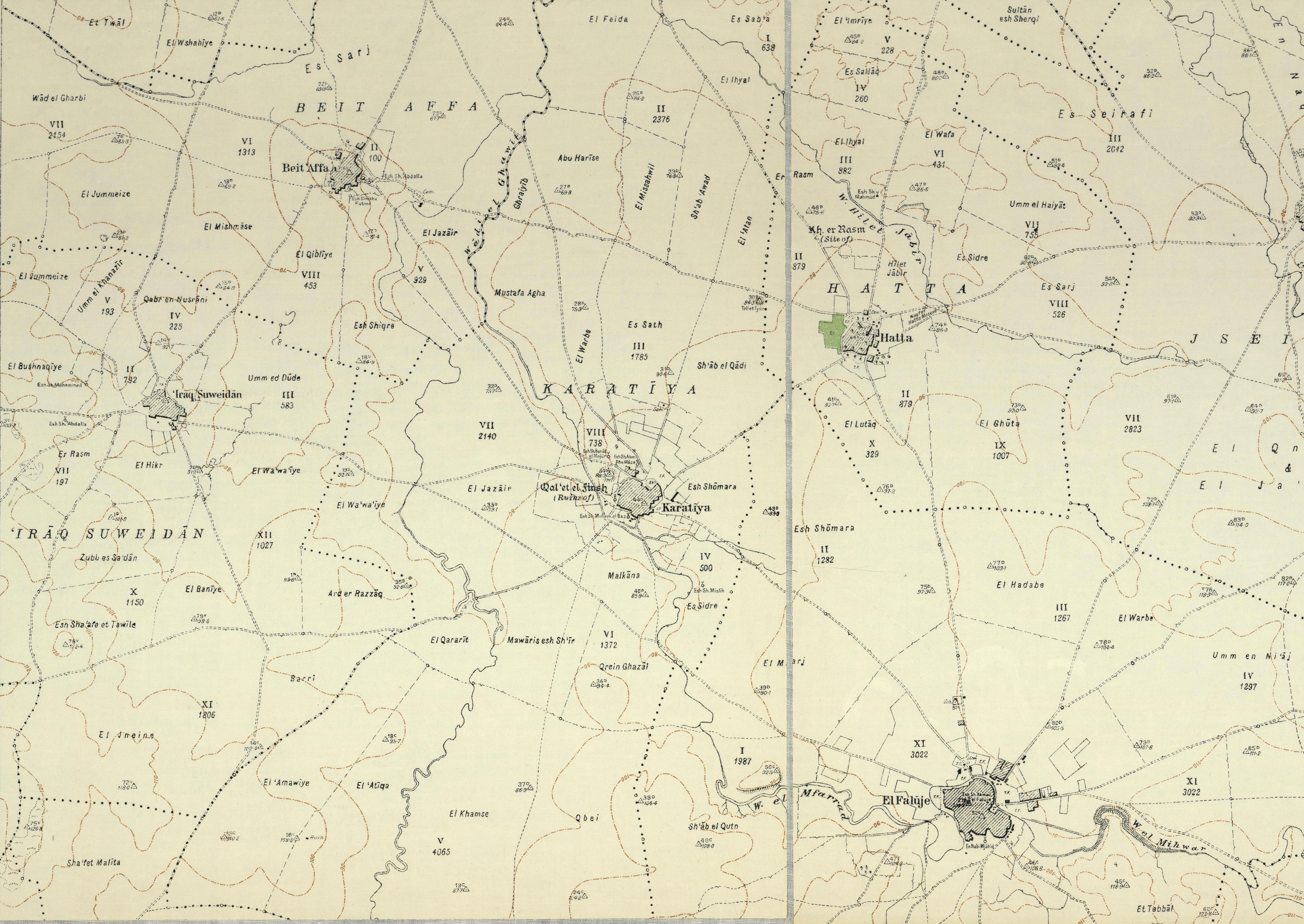
Karatiyya 1930 1:20,000

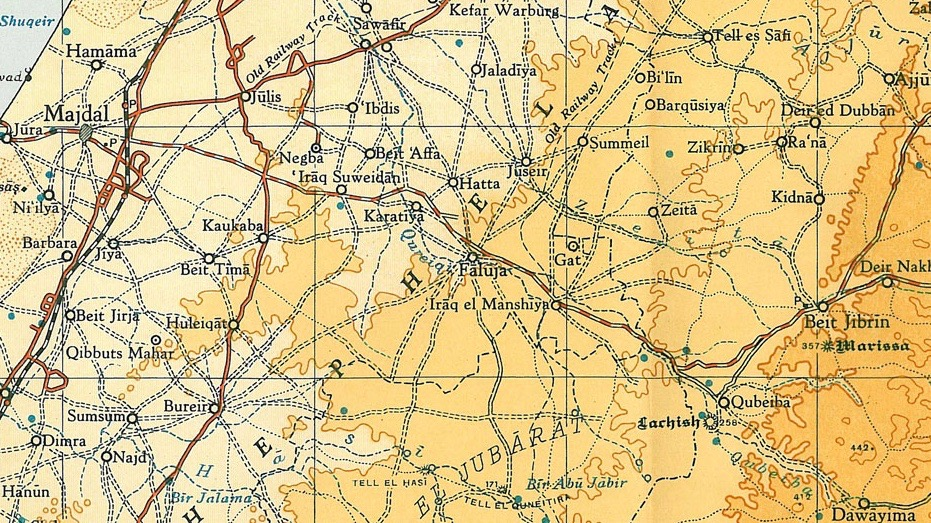
Karatiyya 1945 1:250,000

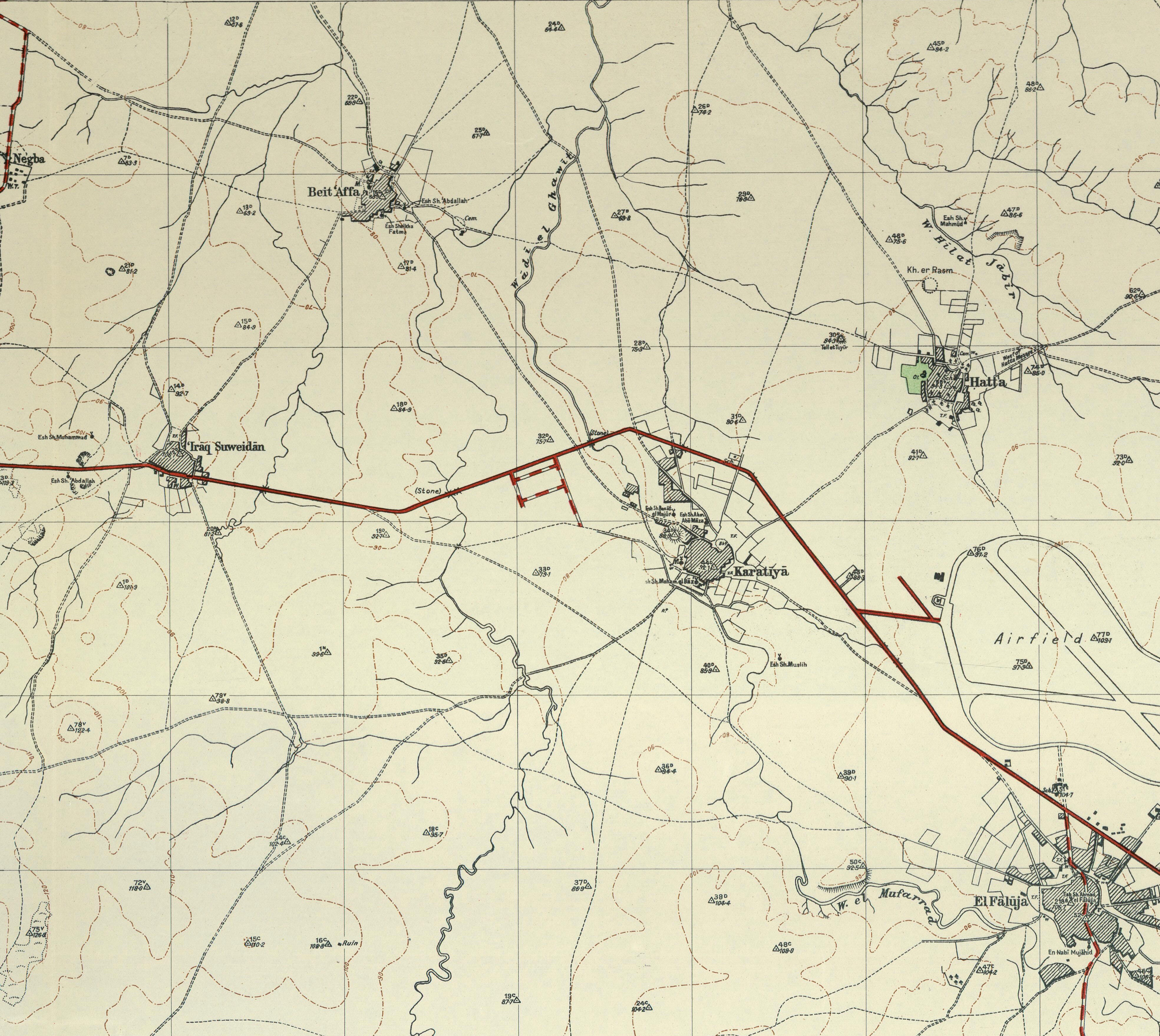
Karatiyya 1948 1:20,000

During the British Mandate of Palestine period in the 20th century, the village houses were built of adobe brick and it relied on the nearby town of al-Faluja for medical, commercial, and administrative services. Karatiyya itself, had a mosque, a grain mill, and an elementary school—the latter was built in 1922 and had an enrollment of 128 students in the mid-1940s. Domestic water was supplied by two wells dug within the village and the primary agricultural crops were grain and prickly pears.

In the 1922 census of Palestine, conducted by the British Mandate authorities, Karatiya had a population of 736 Muslims, increasing in the 1931 census to 932, still all Muslims, in 229 houses.

In the 1945 statistics Karatiyya had a population of 1,370 Muslims, with a total of 13,709 dunams of land, according to an official land and population survey. Of this, 321 dunams were used for plantations and irrigable land, 12,928 for cereals, while 48 dunams were built-up land.

=== 1948 War, and aftermath ===
As a part of a new policy the Haganah blew up a house in Karatiyya on the night of December 9, 1947, the orders to the Givati Brigade who executed the order had been for "two houses".

Karatiyya was captured by the Israeli Army's 89th Mechanized Battalion, commander Moshe Dayan, on July 18, 1948, as part of Operation Death to the Invader. Its inhabitants fled upon their arrival, according to Dayan. According to Benny Morris, the village "was harassed by machine-gun fire and abandoned by its inhabitants". Israeli forces intended to link their northern territory with that held by Israeli forces in the Negev, but succeeded only partially, only taking control of Hatta and Karatiyya. After it was stormed by Dayan's troops he controversially withdrew them leaving a Givati infantry company to hold the position. A fierce battle ensued between them and the Egyptian Army who got as far as the village outskirts. When two Egyptian tanks were on the verge of breaking the Israeli defenses from the south, a unit hiding behind a wall of prickly pear cacti, armed with anti-tank weapons "changed the course of the battle", according to Haganah accounts.

Following the war the area was incorporated into the State of Israel. On August 20, 1948, Ben-Gurion together with Yehoshua Eshel, presented a plan for 32 new Jewish settlements on newly depopulated Palestinian villages, with a settlement named Otzem or Komemiyut proposed for Karatiyya. Three villages were eventually founded on village land; Komemiyut in 1950 and Revaha in 1953, close to the village site. Nehora, established in 1956, is partly on village land, and partly on land belonging to al-Faluja.

The Palestinian historian Walid Khalidi described Karatiyya in 1992: "Piles of debris are scattered on the site, and a destroyed cemetery (partially hidden among eucalyptus trees) can be seen. An agricultural road runs through it. Grain and alfalfa are grown by Israeli farmers on the site and surrounding lands."

Some of Karatiyya's residents came from Egypt and Transjordan, and some had long-standing roots in the area.

== See also ==
- Depopulated Palestinian locations in Israel

== Bibliography ==
- Barron, J.B., ed. (1923). Palestine: Report and General Abstracts of the Census of 1922. Government of Palestine.
- Conder, C.R.; Kitchener, H.H. (1883). The Survey of Western Palestine: Memoirs of the Topography, Orography, Hydrography, and Archaeology. Vol. 3. London: Committee of the Palestine Exploration Fund.
- Dauphin, C. (1998). La Palestine byzantine, Peuplement et Populations. BAR International Series 726 (in French). Vol. III : Catalogue. Oxford: Archeopress. ISBN 0-860549-05-4.
- Government of Palestine, Department of Statistics (1945). Village Statistics, April, 1945.
- Guérin, V. (1869). Description Géographique Historique et Archéologique de la Palestine (in French). Vol. 1: Judee, pt. 2. Paris: L'Imprimerie Nationale.
- Hadawi, S. (1970). Village Statistics of 1945: A Classification of Land and Area ownership in Palestine. Palestine Liberation Organization Research Center.
- Hartmann, M. (1883). "Die Ortschaftenliste des Liwa Jerusalem in dem türkischen Staatskalender für Syrien auf das Jahr 1288 der Flucht (1871)". Zeitschrift des Deutschen Palästina-Vereins. 6: 102–149.
- Hütteroth, W.-D.; Abdulfattah, K. (1977). Historical Geography of Palestine, Transjordan and Southern Syria in the Late 16th Century. Erlanger Geographische Arbeiten, Sonderband 5. Erlangen, Germany: Vorstand der Fränkischen Geographischen Gesellschaft. ISBN 3-920405-41-2.
- Khalidi, W. (1992). All That Remains: The Palestinian Villages Occupied and Depopulated by Israel in 1948. Washington D.C.: Institute for Palestine Studies. ISBN 0-88728-224-5.
- Le Strange, G. (1890). Palestine Under the Moslems: A Description of Syria and the Holy Land from A.D. 650 to 1500. London: Committee of the Palestine Exploration Fund.
- Mills, E., ed. (1932). Census of Palestine 1931. Population of Villages, Towns and Administrative Areas. Jerusalem: Government of Palestine.
- Morris, B. (2004). The Birth of the Palestinian Refugee Problem Revisited. Cambridge University Press. ISBN 978-0-521-00967-6.
- Palmer, E.H. (1881). The Survey of Western Palestine: Arabic and English Name Lists Collected During the Survey by Lieutenants Conder and Kitchener, R. E. Transliterated and Explained by E.H. Palmer. Committee of the Palestine Exploration Fund.
- Pringle, D. (1997). Secular buildings in the Crusader Kingdom of Jerusalem: an archaeological Gazetter. Cambridge University Press. ISBN 0521-46010-7.
- Robinson, E.; Smith, E. (1841). Biblical Researches in Palestine, Mount Sinai and Arabia Petraea: A Journal of Travels in the year 1838. Vol. 2. Boston: Crocker & Brewster.
- Robinson, E.; Smith, E. (1841). Biblical Researches in Palestine, Mount Sinai and Arabia Petraea: A Journal of Travels in the year 1838. Vol. 3. Boston: Crocker & Brewster.
- Socin, A. (1879). "Alphabetisches Verzeichniss von Ortschaften des Paschalik Jerusalem". Zeitschrift des Deutschen Palästina-Vereins. 2: 135–163.
