= Lakhish =

Lakhish or Lachish (Hebrew: לכיש) may refer to:

- Lachish, Canaanite and Israelite city in the Judaean foothills
- Lakhish, Israel, moshav in south-central Israel
- Lakhish Regional Council, regional council in south-central Israel
- Lakhish River from the same area
- Hevel Lakhish, region of south-central Israel
