= Neta, Israel =

Community settlement in southern Israel

Neta: נטע (Hebrew)
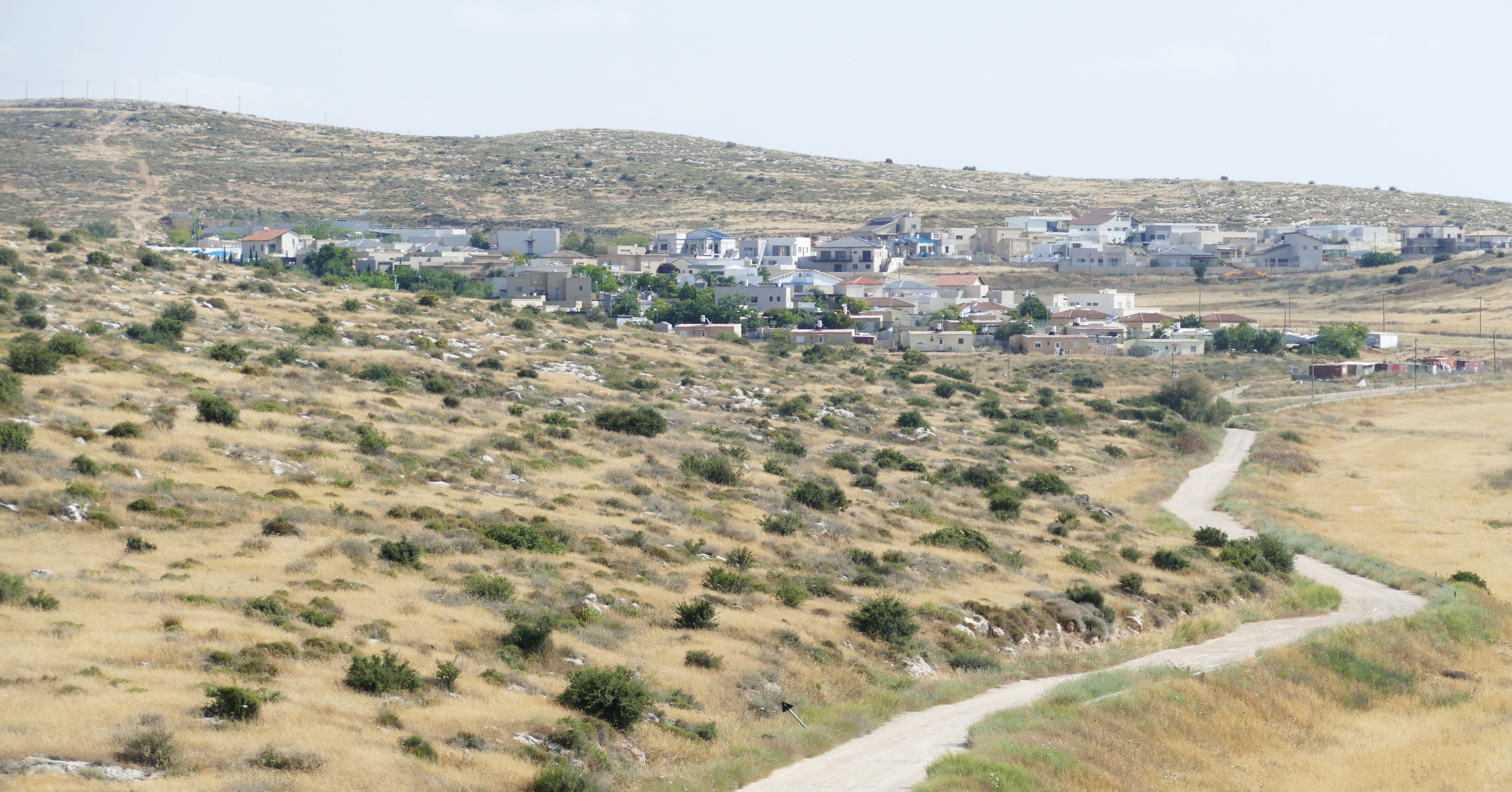
- Etymology: Seedling
- Location within Ashkelon region of Israel Location within Israel
- Coordinates: 31°28′42″N 34°55′35″E
- Country: Israel
- District: Southern
- Subdistrict: Ashkelon
- Council: Lakhish
- Affiliation: Amana
- Founded: 2012
- Population (2024): 991

Neta (Hebrew: נטע, lit. 'Seedling') is a community settlement in south-central Israel. Located next to the Green Line, it falls under the jurisdiction of Lakhish Regional Council. In 2024 it had a population of 991.

== History ==
The village was established in 2012 by former residents of the Kfar Darom and Tel Katifa Israeli settlements in the Gaza Strip, which had been evacuated as part of the Israeli disengagement from Gaza. Following the disengagement in 2005, they had temporarily lived in Ashkelon until the new village was ready.

Environmental groups objected to the establishment of this new community and advocated for settling this population in already-existing townships in the area in order to minimize the environmental impact on the Lachish Region. However, the Israeli Supreme Court ruled in favor of establishing the new settlement in 2009.
