= Tlamim =

Tlamim: תְּלָמִים (Hebrew); تلاميم (Arabic)
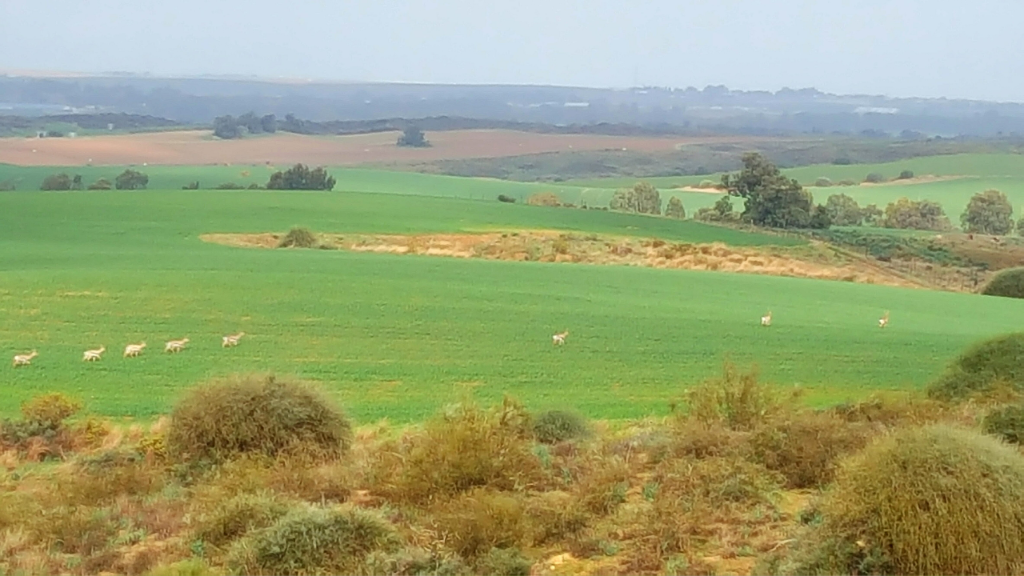
- Etymology: Furrows
- Location within Ashkelon region of Israel
- Coordinates: 31°33′47″N 34°40′10″E
- Country: Israel
- District: Southern
- Subdistrict: Ashkelon
- Council: Lakhish
- Affiliation: Moshavim Movement
- Founded: 1950
- Population (2024): 924

Tlamim (Hebrew: תְּלָמִים, lit. Furrows) is a moshav in southern Israel. Located in Hevel Lakhish it falls under the jurisdiction of Lakhish Regional Council. In 2024 it had a population of 924.

== History ==
The moshav was founded in 1950 by Jewish refugees from the island of Djerba in Tunisia as part of the effort to settle the region. Its name is derived from a verse in the Book of Psalms (65:11): "Thou waterest the ridges thereof abundantly, thou settlest the furrows thereof."

It was founded on the land of the depopulated Palestinian village of Burayr.
