= Eliav, Israel =

Community settlement in southern Israel

Eliav: חָרוּב (Hebrew); إلياف (Arabic)
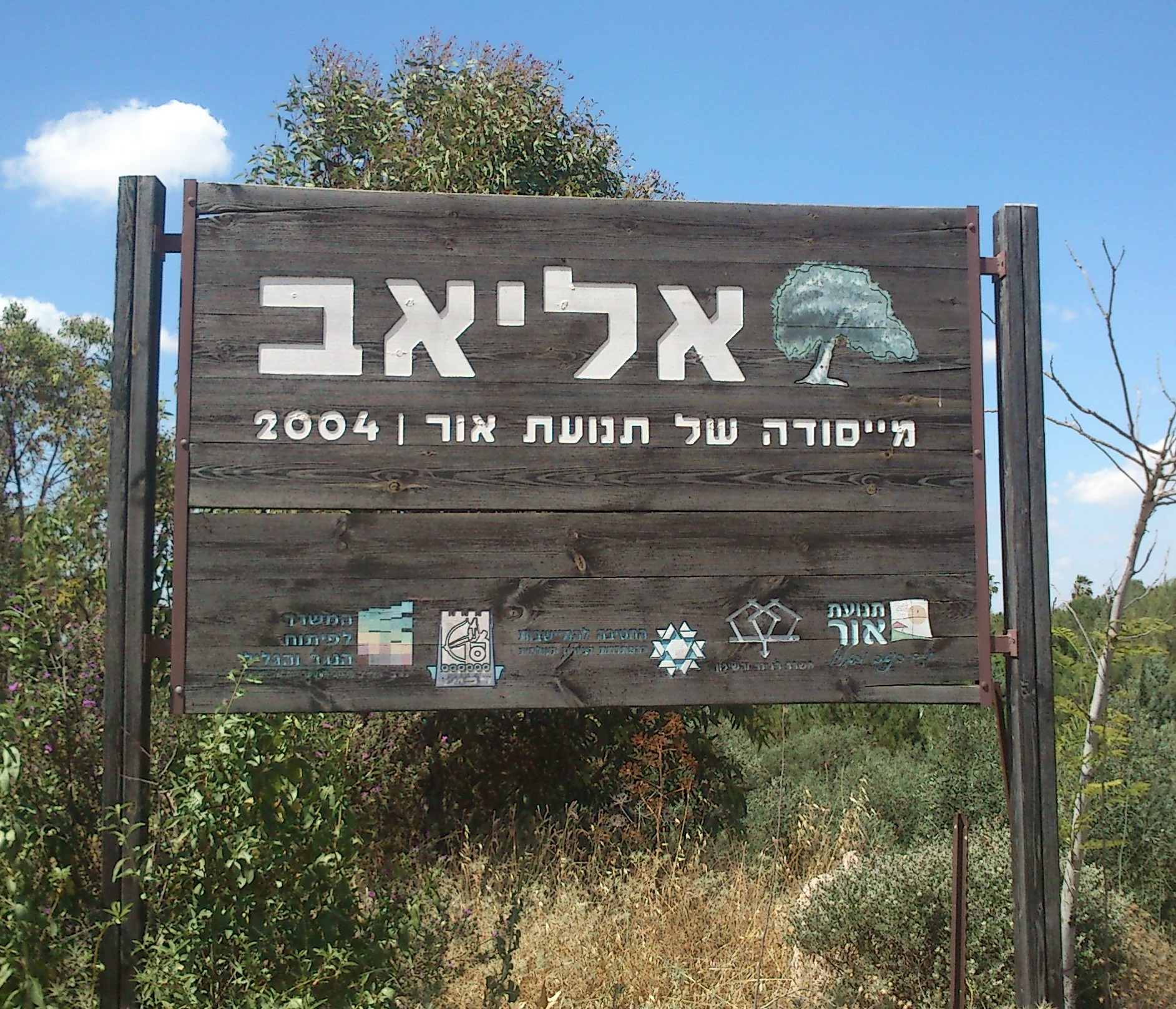

- Location within Ashkelon region of Israel
- Coordinates: 31°31′47″N 34°55′47″E
- Country: Israel
- District: Southern
- Subdistrict: Ashkelon
- Council: Lakhish
- Founded: 2004
- Founder: Beitar Movement
- Population (2024): 846

Eliav (Hebrew: אֱלִיאָב) is a communal settlement in south-central Israel. Located in Hevel Lakhish, it falls under the jurisdiction of Lakhish Regional Council. In 2024, it had a population of 846.

== History ==
Eliav was founded in 2004 and was initially named Haruv (חָרוּב) after the eponymous carob tree that grows in the community's region. Secular, traditional, and religious Jews live there and join as partners in education, Judaism, and culture. The community supports the environment and is part of the ecosystem of the Shephelah. Planning and construction in the community are focused on preserving the environment.

In 2011, the village's name was changed to Eliav in memory of Aryeh Eliav, a politician and activist.
