= Sde David =

Moshav in southern Israel

Sde David: שְׂדֵה דָּוִד (Hebrew); سدي داوود (Arabic)
- Etymology: David's Field
- Location within Ashkelon region of Israel
- Coordinates: 31°34′37″N 34°41′2″E
- Country: Israel
- District: Southern
- Subdistrict: Ashkelon
- Council: Lakhish
- Affiliation: HaOved HaTzioni
- Founded: 1955
- Founder: Moroccan immigrants
- Population (2024): 796

Sde David (Hebrew: שְׂדֵה דָּוִד, lit. David's Field) is a moshav in southern Israel. Located in Hevel Lakhish, it falls under the jurisdiction of Lakhish Regional Council. In 2024 it had a population of 796.

== History ==
The moshav was founded in 1955 by Jewish immigrants from the Moroccan youth movement HaNoar HaTzioni, as part of the effort to settle the region. The moshav is located on the lands of the depopulated Palestinian village of Burayr. It was named after Zalman David Levontin, a Russian banker, pioneer of Jewish settlement in the Land of Israel and the founder and director of the Anglo-Palestine Bank (which later became Bank Leumi).
