= Menuha =

Moshav in southern Israel

Menuha: מנוחה (Hebrew); منوحا (Arabic)

Hebrew transcription(s)
  - Unofficial: Menucha
- Location within Ashkelon region of Israel
- Coordinates: 31°39′27″N 34°46′39″E
- Country: Israel
- District: Southern
- Subdistrict: Ashkelon
- Council: Lakhish
- Affiliation: Moshavim Movement
- Founded: 1953
- Founder: Iraqi immigrants
- Population (2024): 794

Menuha (Hebrew: מְנוּחָה) is a moshav in south-central Israel. Located to the north of Kiryat Gat and south of Kiryat Malakhi, it falls under the jurisdiction of Lakhish Regional Council. In 2024 it had a population of 794.

== History ==
It was founded in 1953 by Jewish refugees to Israel from Kurdistan region of Iraq, adjacent to the ruins of the Arab Palestinian village Jusayr, which was depopulated in the 1948 Arab–Israeli War.

Along with neighboring Nahla, it was named after "Biblical passage "Blessed be the Lord who has given rest to his people Israel ..." (1 Kings 8:56) and for the Menuha VeNahala (Hebrew: מנוחה ונחלה) organization that founded Rehovot. Menuha means "rest" or "ease" in Hebrew.
