= Sde Moshe =

Moshav in southern Israel

Sde Moshe: שְׂדֵה מֹשֶׁה (Hebrew); سدي موشي (Arabic)
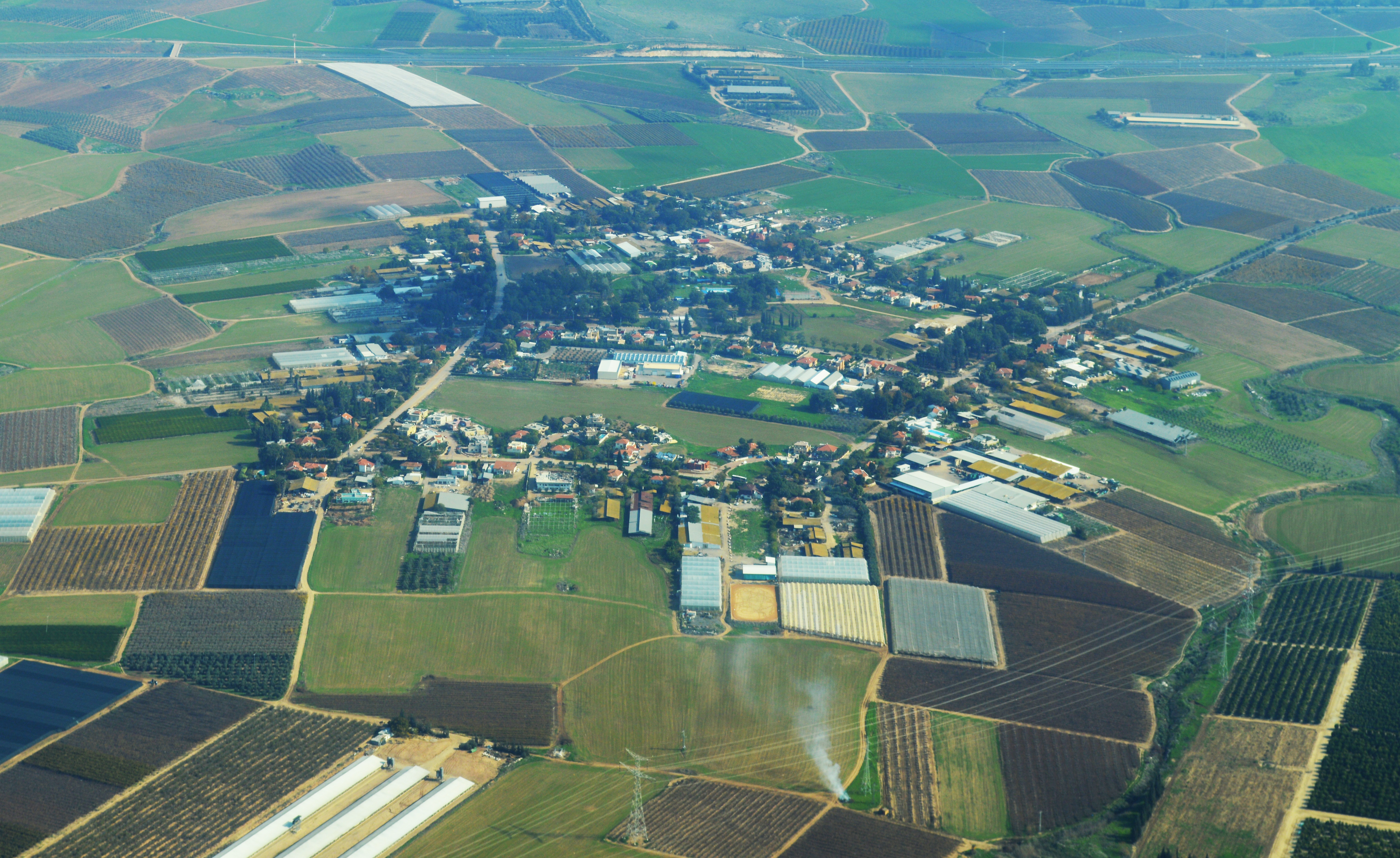
- Etymology: Moshe's Field
- Location within Ashkelon region of Israel
- Coordinates: 31°36′38″N 34°48′8″E
- Country: Israel
- District: Southern
- Subdistrict: Ashkelon
- Council: Lakhish
- Affiliation: Moshavim Movement
- Founded: 1956
- Population (2024): 690

Sde Moshe (Hebrew: שְׂדֵה מֹשֶׁה, lit. Moshe Field) is a moshav in south-central Israel. Located in Hevel Lakhish, about three kilometres east of Kiryat Gat, it falls under the jurisdiction of Lakhish Regional Council. In 2024 it had a population of 690.

== History ==
Sde Moshe was founded in 1956 as part of a movement from the city to the village.

It is named after Baron Maurice de Hirsch, whose Hebrew name was Moshe, and who was one of the founders of the Jewish Colonization Association. It was originally named "Sde Eliyahu."
