= Noga, Israel =

Moshav in southern Israel

Noga: נֹגַהּ, נוגה (Hebrew); نوغا (Arabic)

Hebrew transcription(s)
  - Official: Nogah
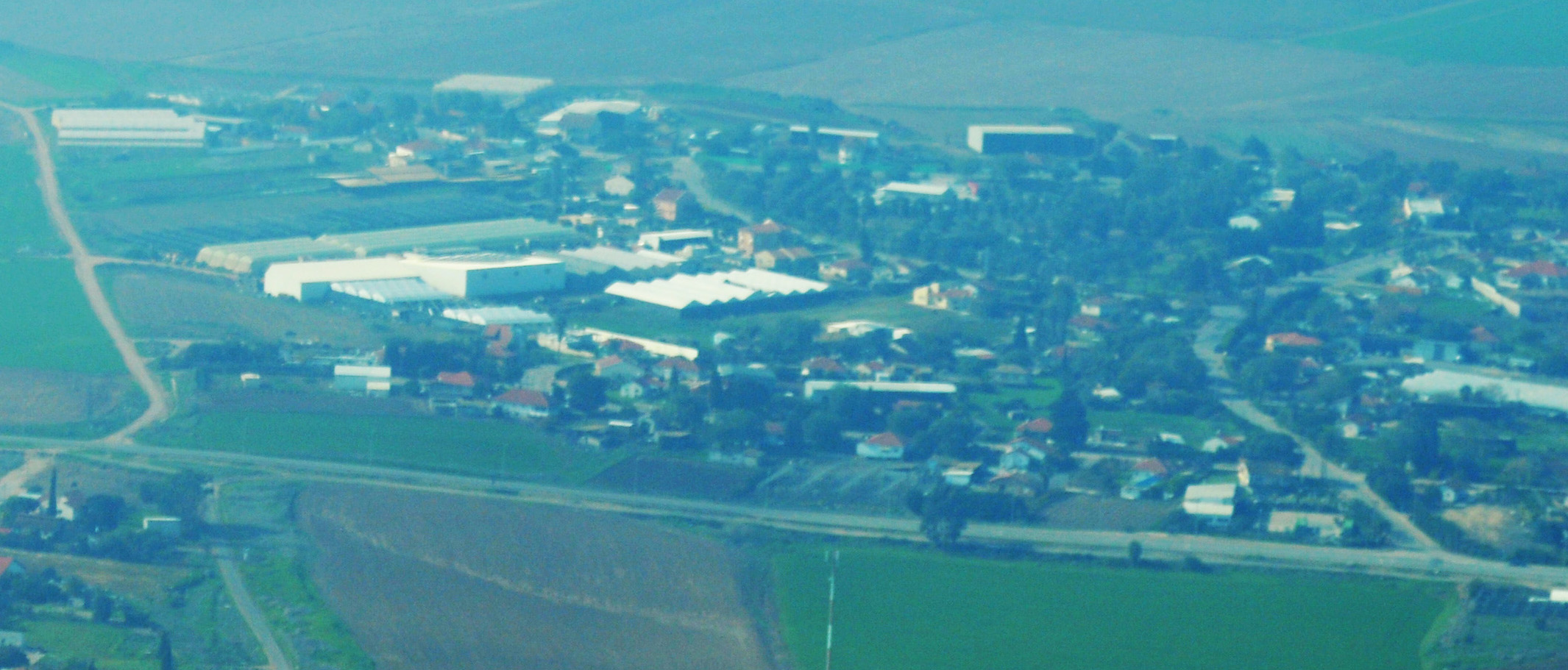
- Etymology: Brightness
- Location within Ashkelon region of Israel
- Coordinates: 31°37′26″N 34°41′43″E
- Country: Israel
- District: Southern
- Subdistrict: Ashkelon
- Council: Lakhish
- Affiliation: Moshavim Movement
- Founded: 1955
- Founder: Iraqi and Persian Jews
- Population (2024): 774

Noga (Hebrew: נֹגַהּ, lit. Light of dawn) is a moshav in south-central Israel. Located in Hevel Lakhish between Ashkelon and Kiryat Gat, it falls under the jurisdiction of Lakhish Regional Council. In 2024 it had a population of 774.

== History ==
The moshav was founded in 1955 by Jewish refugees to Israel from the Kingdom of Iraq and Pahlavi Iran, at a site near the former depopulated Arab village of al-Faluja. The name "Noga" is symbolic of the brightness of Jewish Zionist settlement in Hevel Lakhish and named after Biblical Proverbs 4:18; "But the path of the righteous is as the light of dawn".
