= Ashkelon Mass Transit System =

- Diagram of the system as of May 2025, based on the Ministry of Transport and Road Safety geographic information system and the DataGov website.

Overview
- Native name: מערכת להסעת המונים בנפת אשקלון
- Status: planned
- Locale: Ashkelon Subdistrict
- Termini: Ashkelon; Rehovot
- Connecting lines: Tel Aviv Metro Line M1; Blue Line of the Tel Aviv Metropolitan Mass Transit System (Rishon Lezion–Ness Ziona–Rehovot)

Service
- Type: Light rail, Bus rapid transit

The Ashkelon Mass Transit System (Hebrew: המערכת להסעת המונים בנפת אשקלון) is a transit system in the Ashkelon Subdistrict, Israel area, planned for 2040. The planning and execution authority was given to the governmental company Ayalon Highways. The system planning was held in parallel to a 2017 housing plan of the Ministry of Construction and Housing.

As of May 2025, the system contains 4 main lines – Blue (Ashdod–Yavne–Rehovot), Turquoise (Yavne–Rehovot), Red (Ashdod–Ashkelon) and Orange (Note: Unlike the Red Line, the Orange Line does not continue to the north of the city of Ashdod. Its northernmost point is the Ashdod central bus station.), which is an alternative path derived from the Red. It originally contained 3 secondary lines of which development was frozen – Greenish (Note: Hebrew: ירקרק) (Rehovot–Gedera–Gan Yavne–Ashdod) and Brown (Kiryat Malakhi–Ashdod). The system connects to Line M1 of the Tel Aviv Metro in its southern section in Rehovot, and to the Blue Line of Gush Dan (Rehovot–Ness Ziona–Rishon LeZion), and to complementary transport systems such as urban and interurban bus lanes and a proposed network of long-distance bike paths in the subdistrict named "Ofnidarom" (Hebrew: אופנידרום).

The first draft of the system, edited by the Israeli firm Gal Urban Systems Planning, was published in August 2020. According to the Master Plan for the Development of Israel's National Road Network for 2050, published in March 2021, the red and blue lines are classified as light rail lines.
