= Al-Faluja =

Depopulated Palestinian village near Gaza

al-Faluja الفالوجة al-Faluga
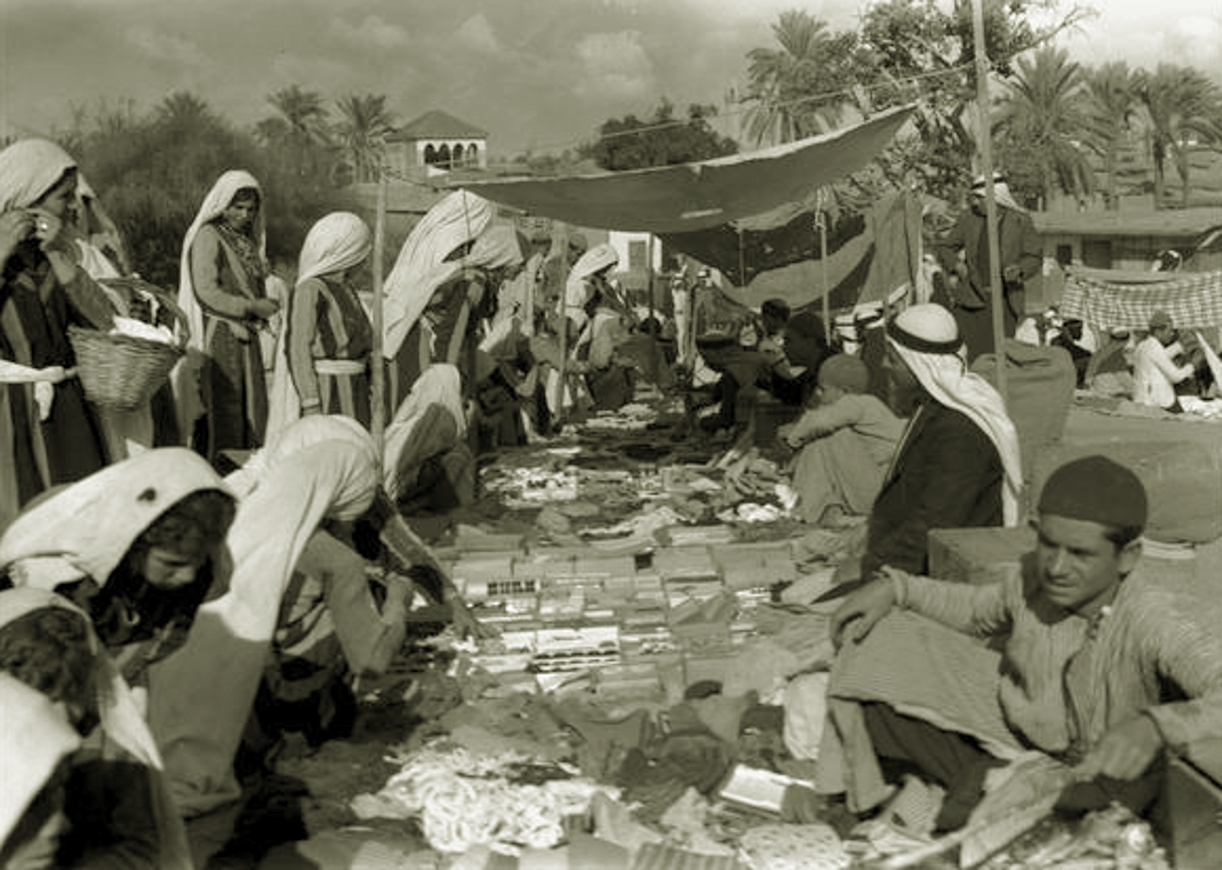
- Souk in Faluja, pre 1948

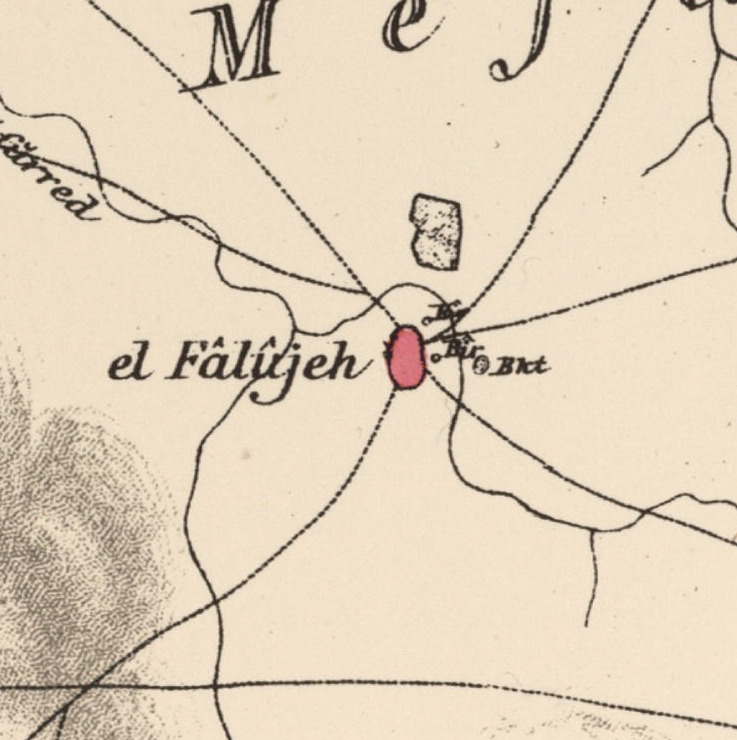
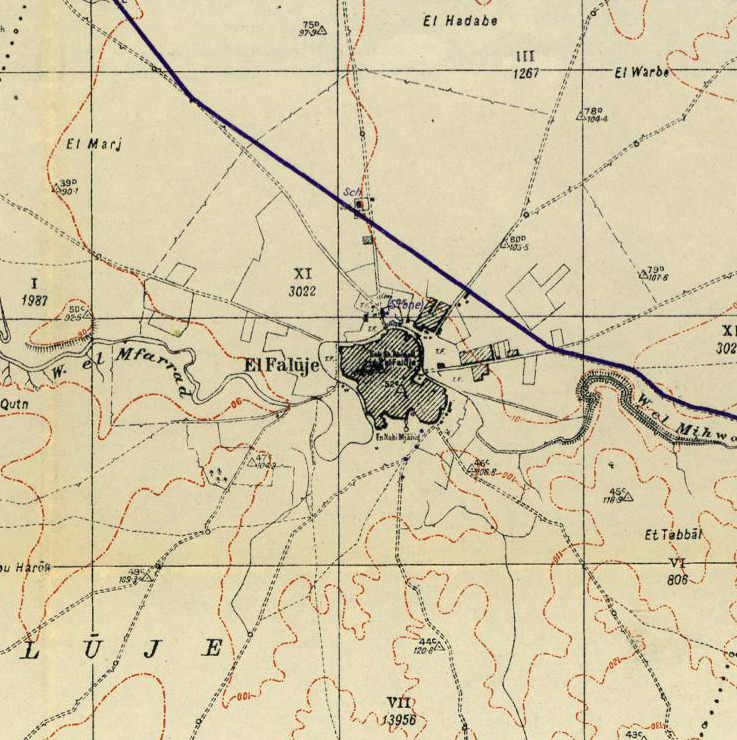
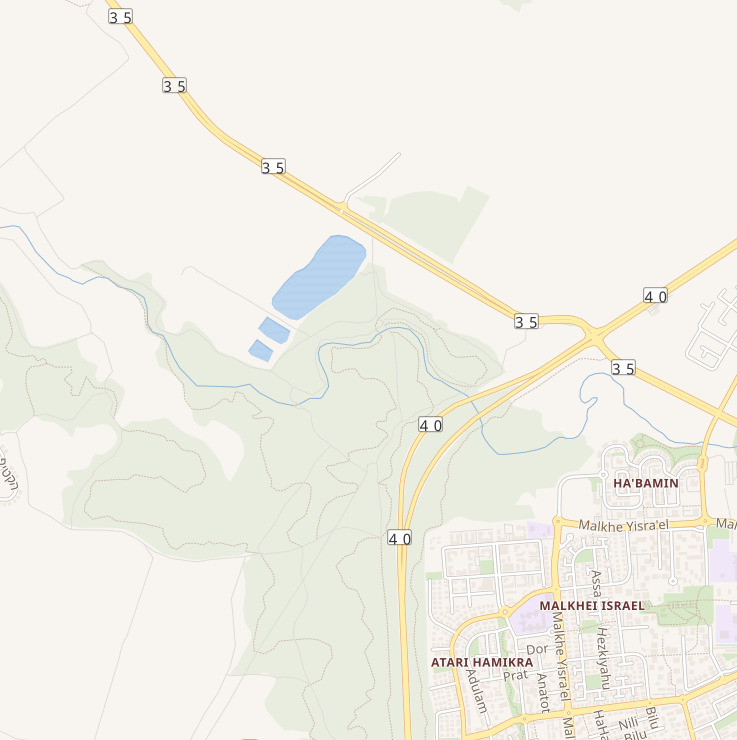
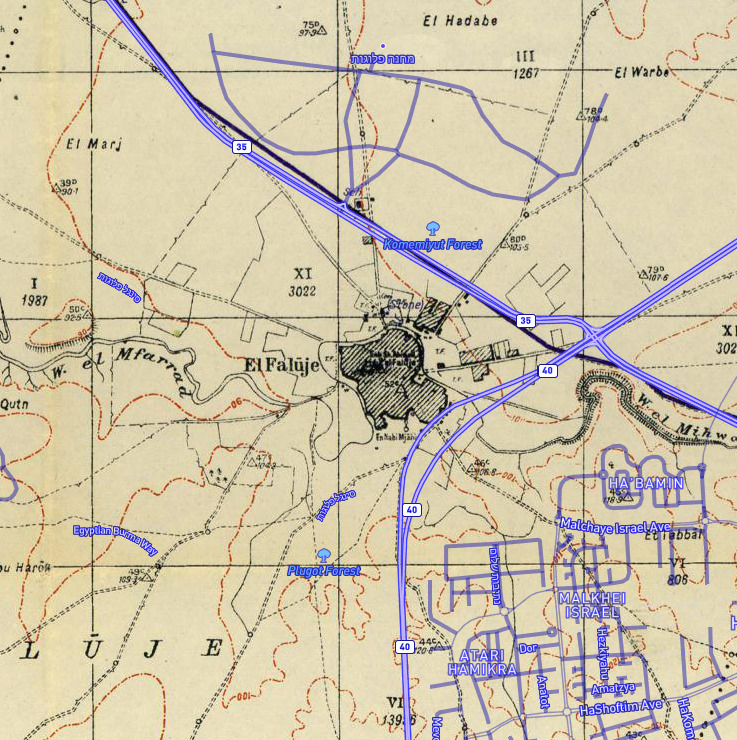
- 1870s map 1940s map modern map 1940s with modern overlay map A series of historical maps of the area around Al-Faluja (click the buttons)

- Location within Mandatory Palestine
- Coordinates: 31°37′29″N 34°44′52″E
- Palestine grid: 126/114
- Geopolitical entity: Mandatory Palestine
- Subdistrict: Gaza
- Date of depopulation: Feb-March 1949

Area
  - Total: 38.0 km^{2} (14.7 sq mi)

Population (1945)
  - Total: 4,670
- Cause(s) of depopulation: Forced out by Yishuv forces
- Current Localities: Kiryat Gat, Shahar, Noga, Nir Chen, Nehora

al-Faluja (Arabic: الفالوجة) was a Palestinian Arab village in the British Mandate for Palestine, located 30 kilometers northeast of Gaza City. Al-Faluja absorbed settlers from various areas, including Dura.

The village and the neighbouring village of Iraq al-Manshiyya formed part of the Faluja pocket, where 4,000 Egyptian troops, who had entered the area as a result of the 1948 war, were besieged for four months by the newly established Israel Defense Forces.

The 1949 Armistice Agreements allowed for a peaceful transfer of those areas outside Gaza to Israeli control, allowing Egyptian troops to remain in Gaza. Following the agreements, the Arab residents were harassed and abandoned the villages. The Israeli town of Kiryat Gat, as well as the moshav Revaha, border the site of the former town.

== History ==
The town was founded on a site that had been known as "Zurayq al-Khandaq", named "Zurayq" from the blue-colored lupin that grew in the vicinity. Its name was changed to "al-Faluja" in commemoration of a Sufi master, Shahab al-Din al-Faluji, who settled near the town after migrating there from Iraq in the 14th century. He died in al-Faluja and his tomb was visited by the Syrian Sufi teacher and traveller Mustafa al-Bakri al-Siddiqi (1688-1748/9), who travelled through the region in the first half of the eighteenth century.

=== Ottoman era ===
In 1596, during the Ottoman era, Al-Faluja was under the administration of the nahiya of Gaza, part of the Sanjak of Gaza, with a population of 75 Muslim households, an estimated 413 persons. The villagers paid a fixed tax rate of 25% on wheat, barley, sesame, fruits, vineyards, beehives, goats, and water buffalo; a total of 5,170 akçe. Half of the revenue went to a waqf.

In 1838, Robinson noted el Falujy as a Muslim village in the Gaza district, though he did not visit it.

In 1863 Victor Guérin found six hundred inhabitants in the village. He also noticed near a well, two ancient columns of gray-white marble, and next to a wali, a third similar but rather destroyed. An Ottoman village list from about 1870 found that Faluja had a population of 670, in 230 houses, though the population count only included men.

In 1883, the Palestine Exploration Fund's Survey of Western Palestine described al-Faluja as surrounded on three sides by a wadi. It had two wells and a pool to the east, a small garden patch to the west, and the village houses were built from adobe bricks.

Faluja was one of the production centers of the gray-black ceramic tradition known as Grey Gaza Ware.

=== British Mandate era ===
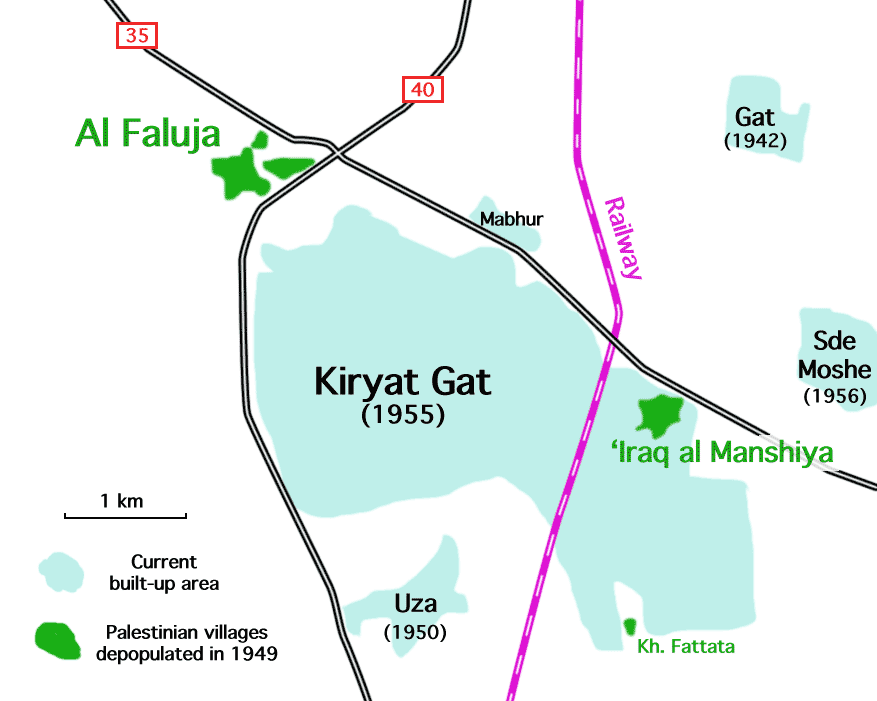
Historical setting of Al-Faluja.

In the 1922 census of Palestine conducted by the British Mandate authorities, Al-Faluja had a population of 2,482 inhabitants; 2,473 Muslims, 3 Jews and 6 Christians, where the Christians were all of the Orthodox faith. The population increased in the 1931 census to 3,161 inhabitants; 2 Christians and all the rest Muslim, in a total of 683 houses.

The nucleus of the village was centered around the shrine of Shaykh al-Faluji. Its residential area began to expand in the 1930s and eventually crossed over to the other side of the wadi, which henceforth divided al-Faluja into northern and southern sections. Bridges were constructed across the wadi to facilitate movement between the two sides, especially during the winter when the water often flooded and caused damage. The center of al-Faluja shifted to the north where modern houses, stores, coffee houses, and a clinic were erected. The village had also two schools; one for boys (built in 1919) and the other for girls (built in 1940).

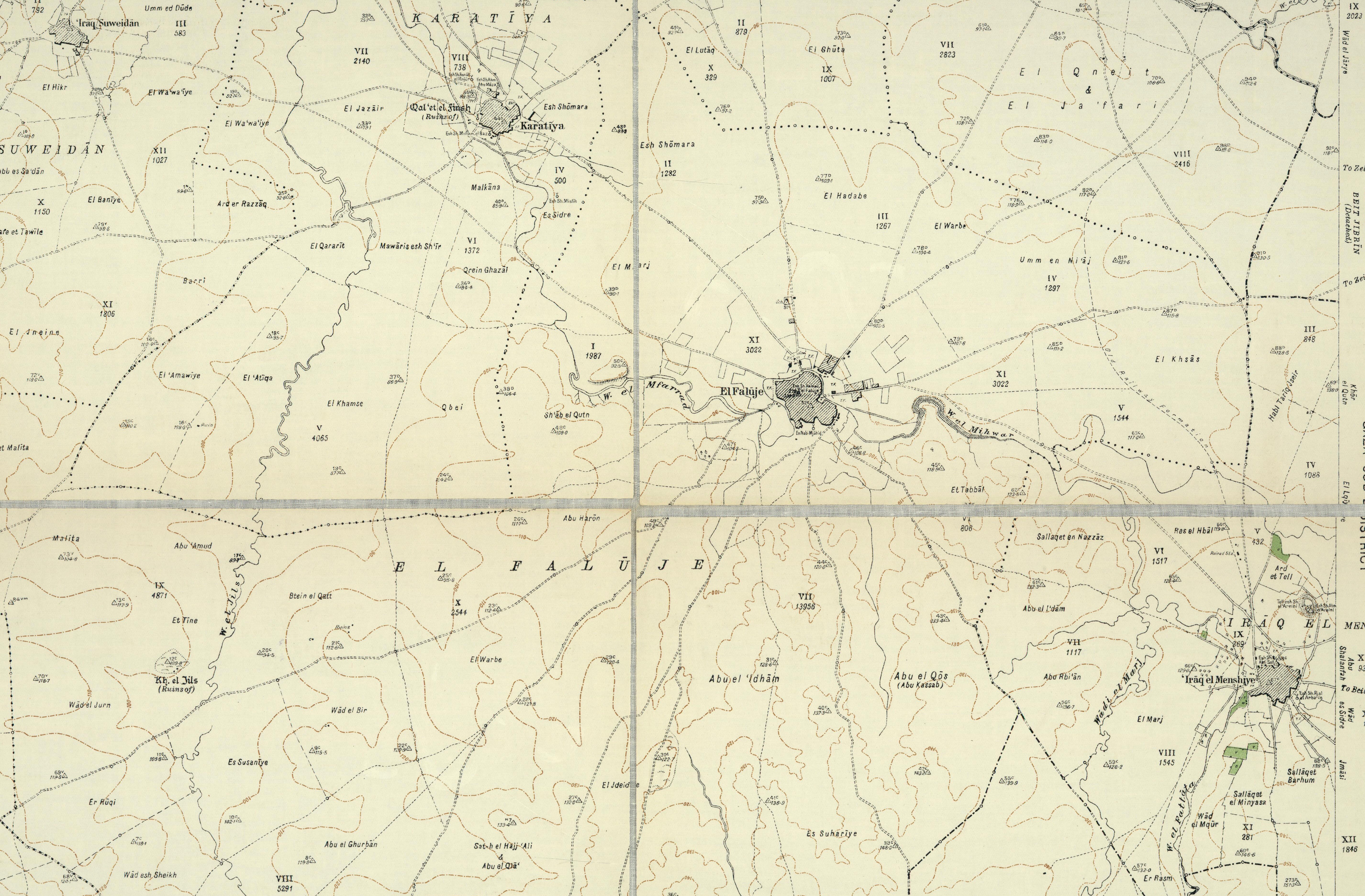
Faluja 1931 1:20,000

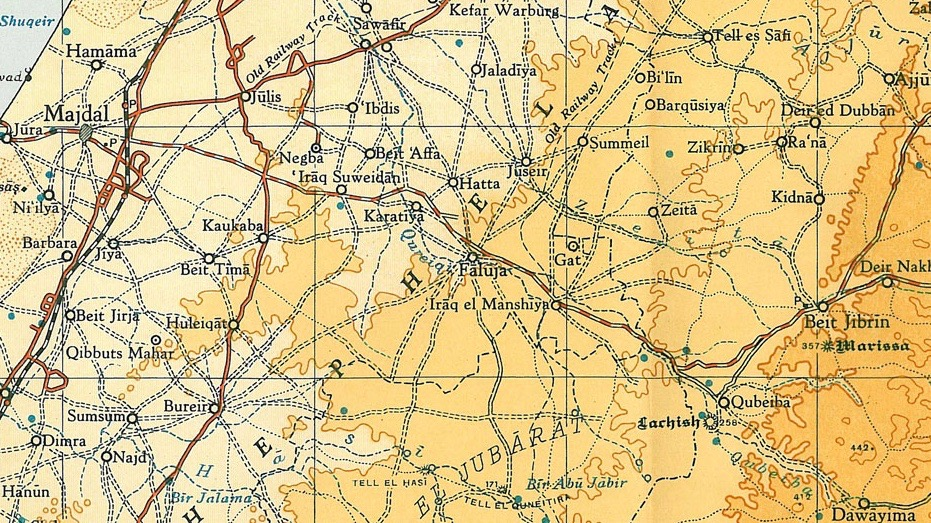
Faluja and surroundings 1945 1:250,000

Palestinian civilians and Israeli soldiers in al-Faluja after the Israeli army entered the village, 1949

In the 1945 statistics Al-Faluja had a population of 4,670, all Muslims, with a total of 38,038 dunams of land, according to an official land and population survey. Of this, 87 dunams were used for plantations and irrigable land, 36,590 for cereals, while a total of 517 dunams were built-up (urban) land.

=== 1948 Arab-Israeli war ===
Al-Faluja was in the territory allotted to the Arab state under the 1947 UN Partition Plan. During the war, the men of the village blockaded the local Jewish communities and attacked convoys being sent to bring them food, water, and other supplies.

On 24 February 1948, the village was attacked by Jewish forces. A battle between Jewish forces and villagers in al-Faluja on 14 March 1948 left thirty-seven Arabs and seven Jews dead, as well as scores of Arabs and four Jews wounded. Israeli sources at the time told the New York Times that a supply convoy, protected by armored cars of the Haganah, "had to fight its way through the village." A Haganah demolition squad returned later in the day and blew up ten houses in the village, including the town hall.

Egyptian forces crossed into the former mandate on 15 May 1948 and a column of them were stopped by the Israelis near Ashdod. This column retreated to and encamped at al-Faluja and Iraq al-Manshiyya, the so-called Faluja pocket. Between late October 1948 and late February 1949 some 4,000 Egyptian troops were encircled and besieged there by Israeli forces; the siege was a formative period for Gamal Abdel Nasser, who was a major in the Egyptian army at Al-Faluja during the siege.

=== Armistice agreement ===
As part of the terms of the February 4, 1949 Israel–Egypt Armistice Agreement, the surrounded Egyptian forces (including future Egyptian President Gamal Abdel Nasser) agreed to return to Egypt. The agreement (uniquely to the two villages), guaranteed the safety and property of the 3,140 Arab civilians (over 2,000 locals, plus refugees from other villages). The agreement, and a further exchange of letters filed with the United Nations, stated ".... those of the civilian population who may wish to remain in al-Faluja and Iraq al-Manshiya are to be permitted to do so. ... All of these civilians shall be fully secure in their persons, abodes, property and personal effects."

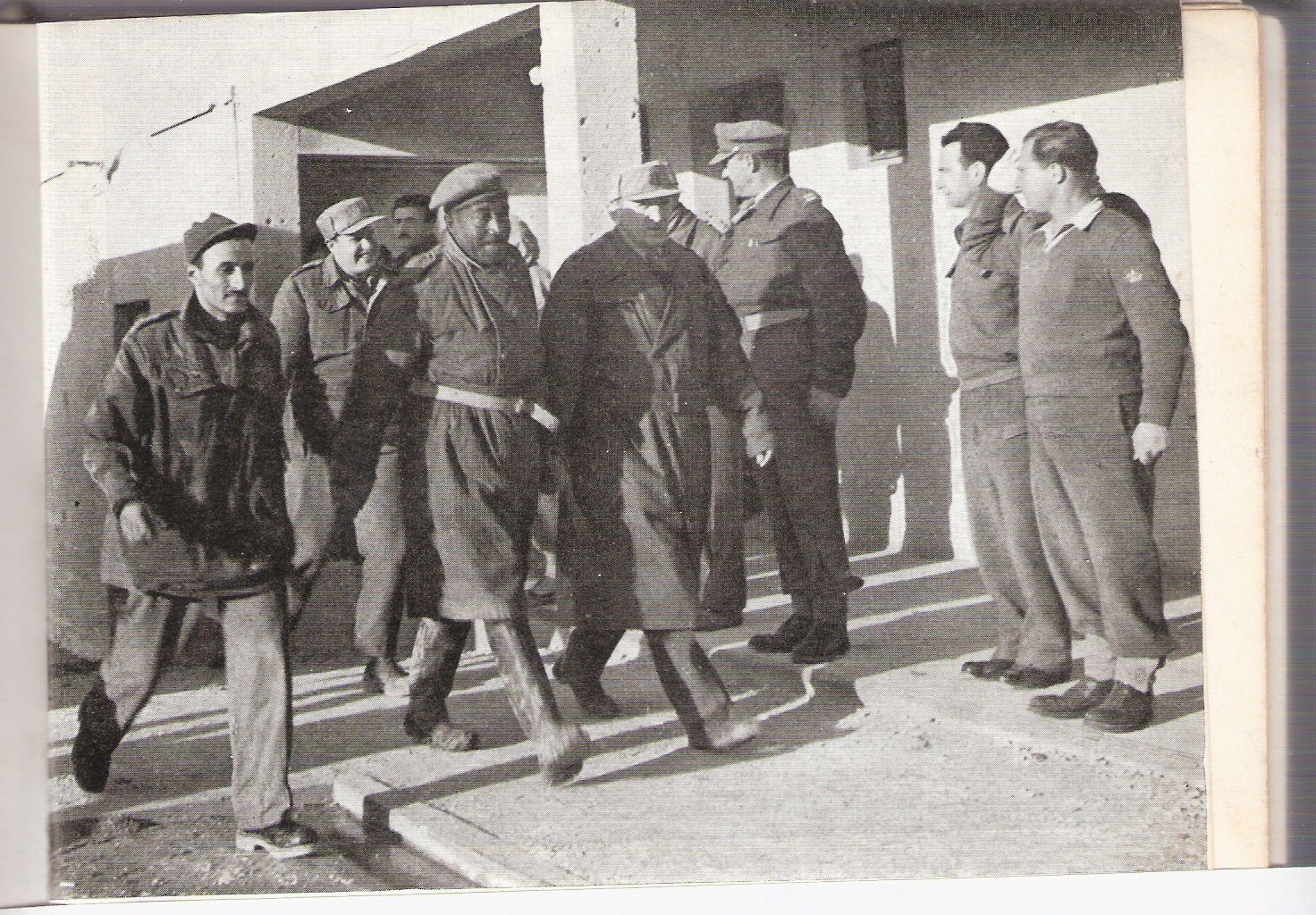
Said Taha Bey, commander of Egyptian forces in the Faluja pocket, heading to negotiate his surrender, 1948-11-11

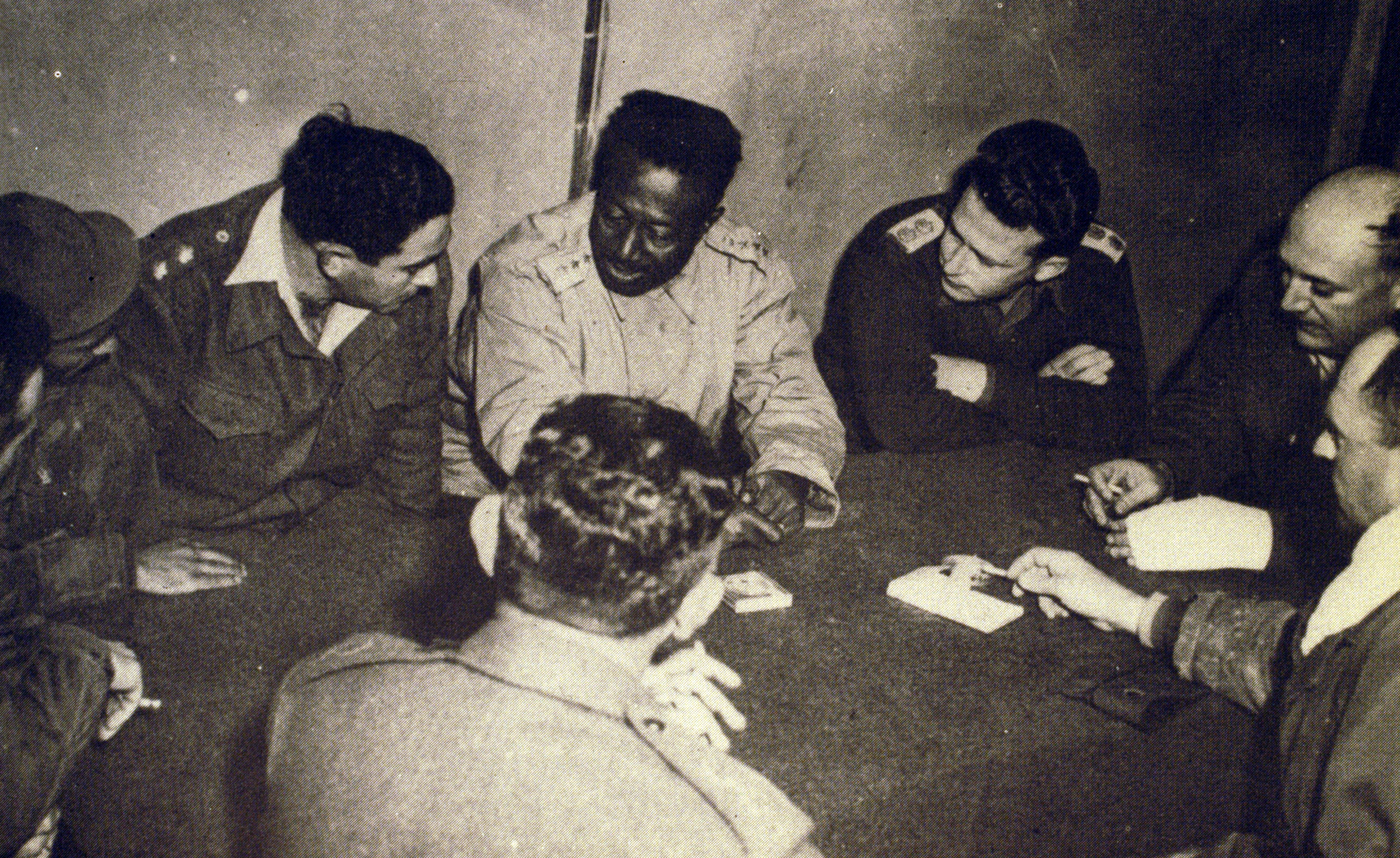
Said Taha Bey with Itzhak Rabin negotiating evacuating the Faluja pocket 27 February 1949

=== Israel ===
Few civilians left when the Egyptian brigade withdrew on 26 February 1949 but Israelis promptly violated the armistice agreement and began to intimidate the populace into flight. United Nations observers reported to UN mediator Ralph Bunche that the intimidation included beatings, robberies, and attempted rape. Quaker observers bore witness to the beatings

"Jane Smith (one of the Quaker party) has bandaged six men. The worst case was a man with two bloody eyes, a torn ear, and a face pounded until it was blue ... A young Arab told me: 'We could not sleep last night because of much shooting and because the Israeli soldiers came into the homes and tried to "make into" the Arab women.'"

On 3 March they wrote that at "Iraq al Manshiya, the acting mukhtar or mayor told them that 'the people had been much molested by the frequent shooting, by being told that they would be killed if they did not go to Hebron, and by the Jews breaking into their homes and stealing things". Moshe Sharett (Israeli Foreign Minister) was very concerned at the international repercussions, especially the possible effect on Israeli-Egyptian relations. He was angry at the actions of the IDF, carried out without Cabinet authorization and behind his back and was not easily appeased. He used most uncharacteristic language "The IDF's actions" threw into question

our sincerity as a party to an international agreement ... One may assume that Egypt in this matter will display special sensitivity as her forces saw themselves as responsible for the fate of these civilian inhabitants. There are also grounds to fear that any attack by us on the people of these two villages may be reflected in the attitude of the Cairo Government toward the Jews of Egypt.

Sharett pointed out that Israel was seeking membership of the United Nations, and was encountering difficulties

over the question of our responsibility for the Arab refugee problem. We argue that we are not responsible ... From this perspective, the sincerity of our professions is tested by our behavior in these villages ... Every intentional pressure aimed at uprooting [these Arabs] is tantamount to a planned act of eviction on our part.

Sharett also protested that the IDF were carrying out a covert

whispering propaganda' campaign among the Arabs, threatening them with attacks and acts of vengeance by the army, which the civilian authorities will be powerless to prevent. This whispering propaganda (ta'amulat lahash) is not being done of itself. There is no doubt that here there is a calculated action aimed at increasing the number of those going to the Hebron Hills as if of their own free will, and, if possible, to bring about the evacuation of the whole civilian population of [the pocket].

He also referred to the army's actions as "'an unauthorized initiative by the local command in a matter relating to Israeli government policy'". Allon admitted (to Yadin) only that his troops had "beaten three Arabs ... There is no truth to the observers' announcement about abuse/cruelty [hit'alelut], etc. I investigated this personally."

Morris further writes that the decision to cleanse the "Faluja pocket" population was approved by Israeli prime minister David Ben-Gurion. The last civilians left on 22 April, and the order to demolish these (and a string of other) villages was made 5 days later by Rabin.

== See also ==
- List of towns and villages depopulated during the 1947–1949 Palestine war
- Operation Yoav

== Bibliography ==
- Barron, J.B., ed. (1923). Palestine: Report and General Abstracts of the Census of 1922. Government of Palestine.
- Conder, C.R.; Kitchener, H.H. (1883). The Survey of Western Palestine: Memoirs of the Topography, Orography, Hydrography, and Archaeology. Vol. 3. London: Committee of the Palestine Exploration Fund.
- Government of Palestine, Department of Statistics (1945). Village Statistics, April, 1945.
- Guérin, V. (1869). Description Géographique Historique et Archéologique de la Palestine (in French). Vol. 1: Judee, pt. 2. Paris: L'Imprimerie Nationale.
- Hadawi, S. (1970). Village Statistics of 1945: A Classification of Land and Area ownership in Palestine. Palestine Liberation Organization Research Center. Archived from the original on 8 December 2018.
- Hartmann, M. (1883). "Die Ortschaftenliste des Liwa Jerusalem in dem türkischen Staatskalender für Syrien auf das Jahr 1288 der Flucht (1871)". Zeitschrift des Deutschen Palästina-Vereins. 6: 102–149.
- Hütteroth, W.-D.; Abdulfattah, K. (1977). Historical Geography of Palestine, Transjordan and Southern Syria in the Late 16th Century. Erlanger Geographische Arbeiten, Sonderband 5. Erlangen, Germany: Vorstand der Fränkischen Geographischen Gesellschaft. ISBN 3-920405-41-2.
- Khalidi, W. (1992). All That Remains: The Palestinian Villages Occupied and Depopulated by Israel in 1948. Washington D.C.: Institute for Palestine Studies. ISBN 0-88728-224-5.
- Khalidi, W. (1992). Palestine Reborn. I.B. Tauris. ISBN 9781850435631.
- Mills, E., ed. (1932). Census of Palestine 1931: Population of Villages, Towns and Administrative Areas. Jerusalem: Government of Palestine.
- Morris, B. (1987). The Birth of the Palestinian refugee problem, 1947-1949. Cambridge University Press. ISBN 0-521-33028-9.
- Morris, B. (2004). The Birth of the Palestinian Refugee Problem Revisited. Cambridge University Press. ISBN 978-0-521-00967-6.
- Nasser, G.A. (1973) [1955]. "Memoirs of the First Palestine War" (PDF). Journal of Palestine Studies. 2 (2 (Win. 73)). doi:10.1525/jps.1973.2.2.00p0045r. Archived from the original on 30 August 2011.
- Palmer, E.H. (1881). The Survey of Western Palestine: Arabic and English Name Lists Collected During the Survey by Lieutenants Conder and Kitchener, R. E. Transliterated and Explained by E.H. Palmer. Committee of the Palestine Exploration Fund.
- Robinson, E.; Smith, E. (1841). Biblical Researches in Palestine, Mount Sinai and Arabia Petraea: A Journal of Travels in the year 1838. Vol. 2. Boston: Crocker & Brewster.
- Robinson, E.; Smith, E. (1841). Biblical Researches in Palestine, Mount Sinai and Arabia Petraea: A Journal of Travels in the year 1838. Vol. 3. Boston: Crocker & Brewster.
- Sharon, M. (2004). Corpus Inscriptionum Arabicarum Palaestinae, D-F. Vol. 3. BRILL. ISBN 90-04-13197-3. (pp. 183 ff)
- Socin, A. (1879). "Alphabetisches Verzeichniss von Ortschaften des Paschalik Jerusalem". Zeitschrift des Deutschen Palästina-Vereins. 2: 135–163.
