= Ahuzam =

Moshav in southern Israel

Ahuzam: אחוזם (Hebrew)

Hebrew transcription(s)
  - Unofficial: Ahuzzam
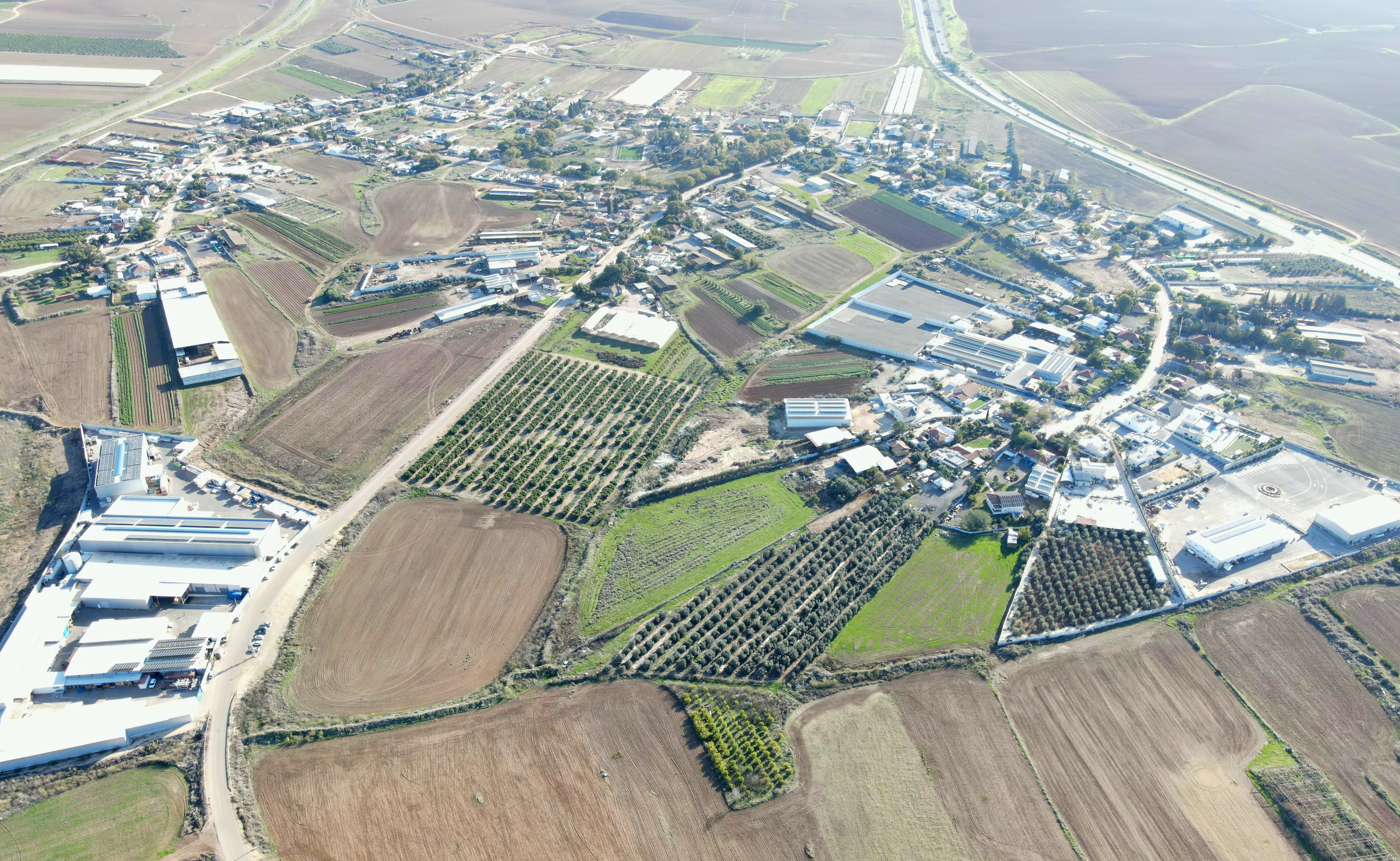
- Etymology: Biblical character
- Location within Ashkelon region of Israel Location within Israel
- Coordinates: 31°33′14″N 34°46′11″E
- Country: Israel
- District: Southern
- Subdistrict: Ashkelon
- Council: Lakhish
- Founded: 30 October 1950
- Founder: Moroccan Ma'agalim Members
- Population (2024): 556

Ahuzam (Hebrew: אחוזם) is a moshav in southern Israel. Located around five kilometres south of Kiryat Gat, it falls under the jurisdiction of Lakhish Regional Council. In 2024 its population was 556.

== Etymology ==
The moshav was originally named Ma'agalim but renamed after the biblical Ahuzam, son of Ashur, the father or founder of Tekoa, who may have lived in this area (1 Book of Chronicles 4:6).

== History ==
Ahuzam was founded on 30 October 1950 by Jewish immigrants from Morocco, members of the Ma'agalim society. It was associated with the Hapoel HaMizrachi movement, but is now a mixed religious and secular community.
