= Amatzia, Israel =

Moshav in southern Israel

Amatzia: אמציה (Hebrew)

Hebrew transcription(s)
  - Standard: Amatzya
  - Official: Amazya
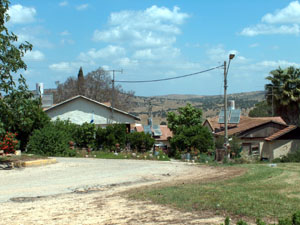
- Etymology: Named for Amaziah of Judah
- Location within Ashkelon region of Israel Location within Israel
- Coordinates: 31°31′57″N 34°54′49″E
- Country: Israel
- District: Southern
- Subdistrict: Ashkelon
- Council: Lakhish
- Affiliation: Mishkei Herut Beitar
- Founded: 1955
- Population (2024): 190

Amatzia (Hebrew: אמציה) is a moshav in south-central Israel. Located around 8 km southeast of Lakhish, it falls under the jurisdiction of Lakhish Regional Council. The population is a mix of religious and secular Israelis, and was 190 in 2024.

== History ==
The moshav was founded in 1955, at the location of the Palestinian town al-Dawayima. It was named for King Amaziah of Judah, who, according to the Book of Kings, was killed in the Lakhish region. In the past the community was a moshav shitufi but it has undergone a process of privatization and abandoned its collective nature.

In 2006, temporary housing was built in the area of the moshav to absorb evacuees from Katif who lived in Gush Katif until they were evacuated under Israel's unilateral disengagement plan.
