= Otzem =

Moshav in southern Israel

Otzem: עֹצֶם, עוצם (Hebrew); عوتسيم (Arabic)
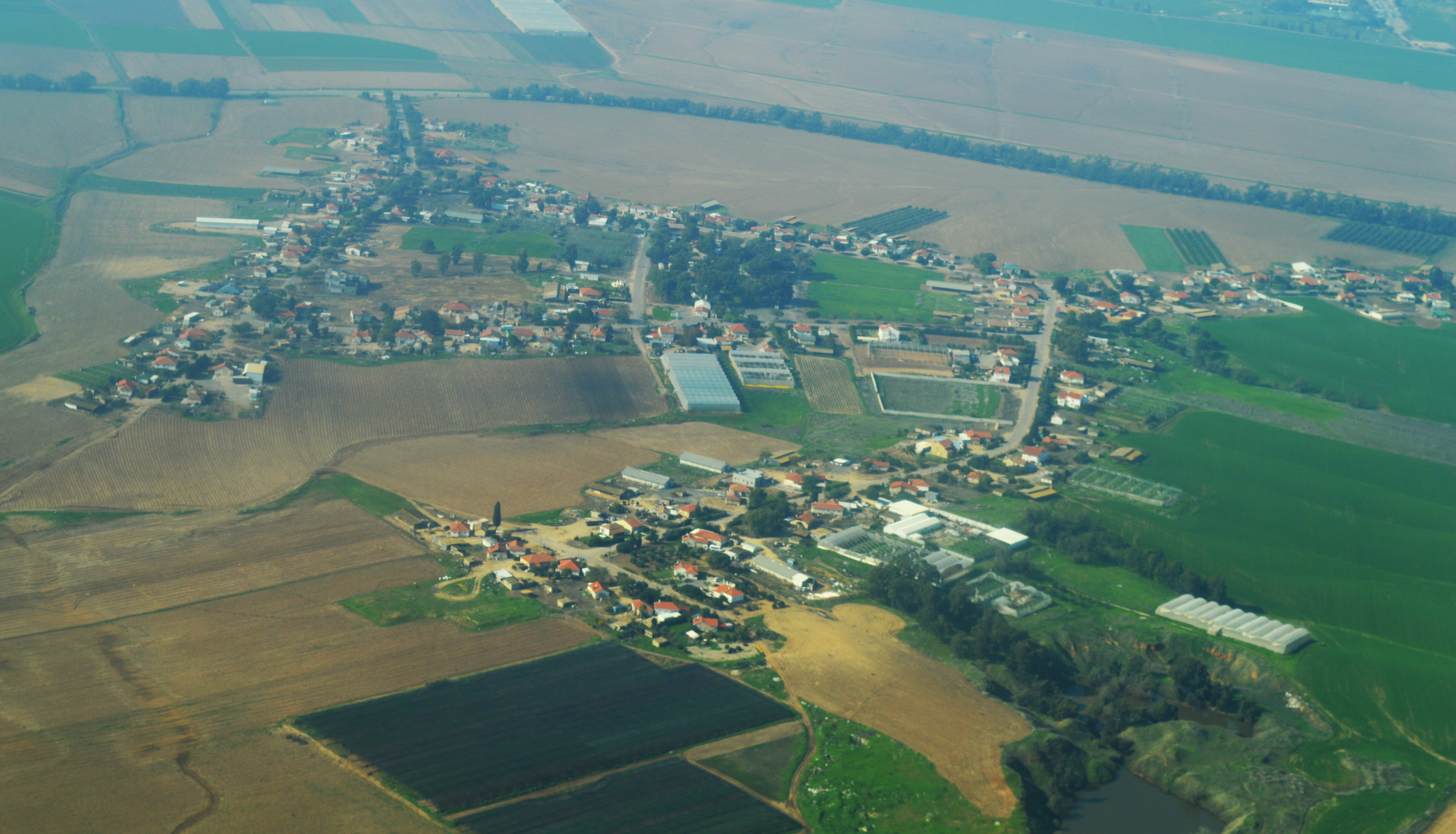
- Etymology: Intensity
- Location within Ashkelon region of Israel
- Coordinates: 31°38′9″N 34°42′11″E
- Country: Israel
- District: Southern
- Subdistrict: Ashkelon
- Council: Lakhish
- Affiliation: Moshavim Movement
- Founded: 1955
- Founder: Moroccan immigrants
- Population (2024): 909

Otzem (Hebrew: עֹצֶם) is a moshav in southern Israel. Located in Hevel Lakhish, it falls under the jurisdiction of Lakhish Regional Council. In 2024 it had a population of 909.

== History ==
Moshav Otzem was established in 1955 by immigrants from Morocco. The name of the village is derived from the verses:

“And you shall say in your heart, ‘My strength and the power of my hand have gotten me this wealth.’ But you shall remember the Lord your God, for it is He who gives you power to get wealth” (Deuteronomy 8:17–18).

The moshav was named as a symbol of the intense battles that took place in the area against the Egyptian invader during Israel’s War of Independence.

The moshav includes 89 original farms. In addition to agriculture, most residents work outside the village, and many are employed in various professions.

The moshav has a synagogue, a kindergarten, and a grocery store, and it hosts many cultural and enrichment activities. The moshav also employs a full-time caretaker responsible for gardening and attending to the needs of the elderly population.

== Archaeology ==
In 1956, a small church with mosaic floors and Greek inscriptions, dating from the fifth to sixth centuries AD, was excavated here.
