= Bnei Dekalim =

Bnei Dekalim: בני דקלים (Hebrew)
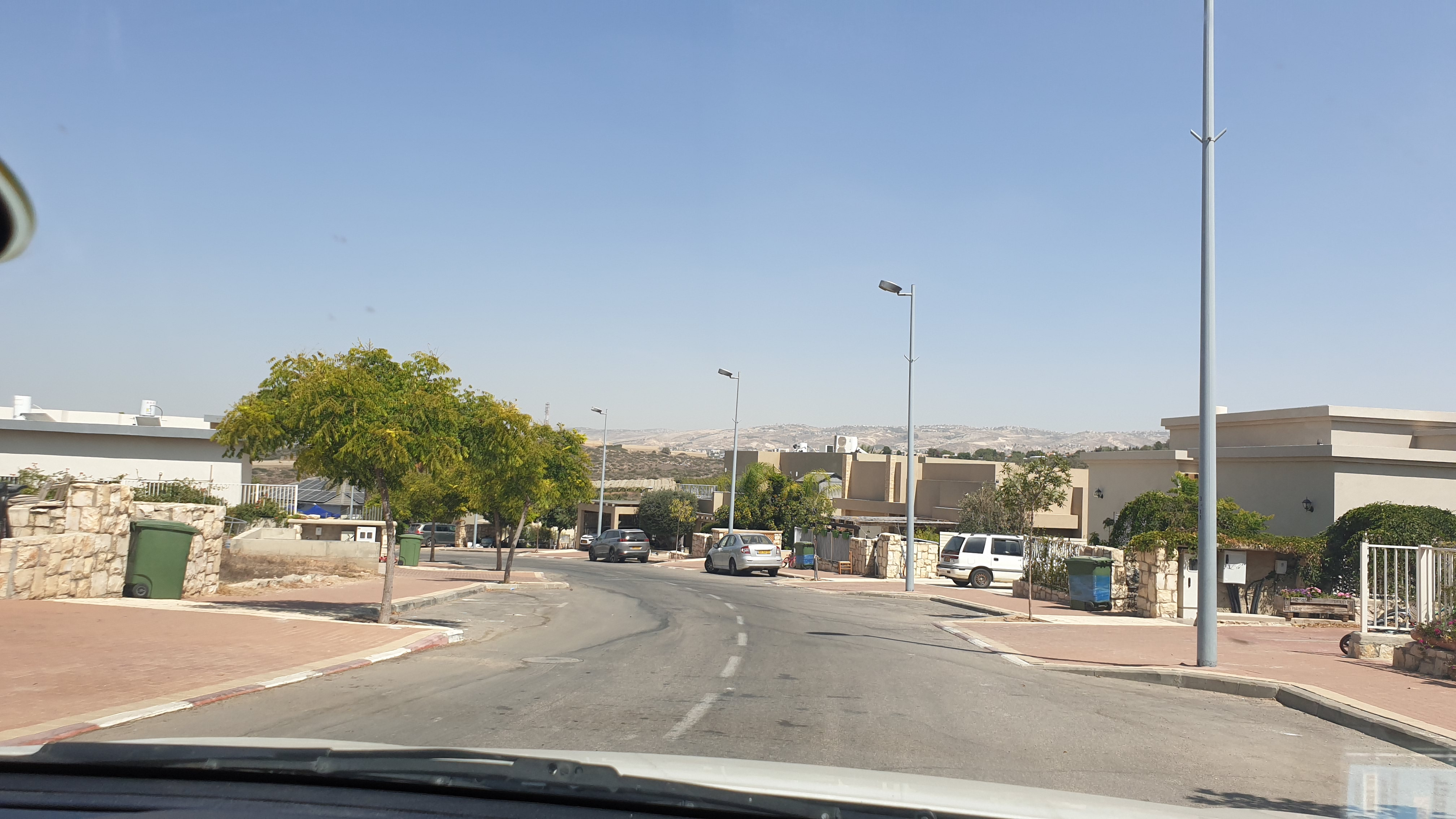

- Location within Ashkelon region of Israel Location within Israel
- Coordinates: 31°31′04″N 34°55′08″E
- Country: Israel
- District: Southern
- Subdistrict: Ashkelon
- Council: Lakhish
- Affiliation: Amana
- Founded: 2009
- Founder: Former Jewish settlers of Neve Dekalim
- Population (2024): 1,947

Bnei Dekalim (Hebrew: בני דקלים, lit. 'Sons of Dekalim') is a community settlement in southern Israel. It falls under the jurisdiction of Lakhish Regional Council and had a population of 1,947 in 2024.

== History ==
The village was established by former residents of Neve Dekalim, an Israeli settlement in the Gaza Strip, following the Israeli disengagement from Gaza in 2005. A cornerstone laying ceremony was held in 2009, and in 2011, the construction of streets and infrastructure and the division of lots was completed. The first families to inhabit the town arrived in 2013, and initially resided in mobile homes. The first permanent homes were occupied shortly thereafter.

There are two regional schools, one for boys and one for girls, as well as a kindergarten and ulpana, a clinic, a synagogue, a mikveh, a community center and a park.
