= Shekef =

Shekef: שקף (Hebrew); شيكيف (Arabic)
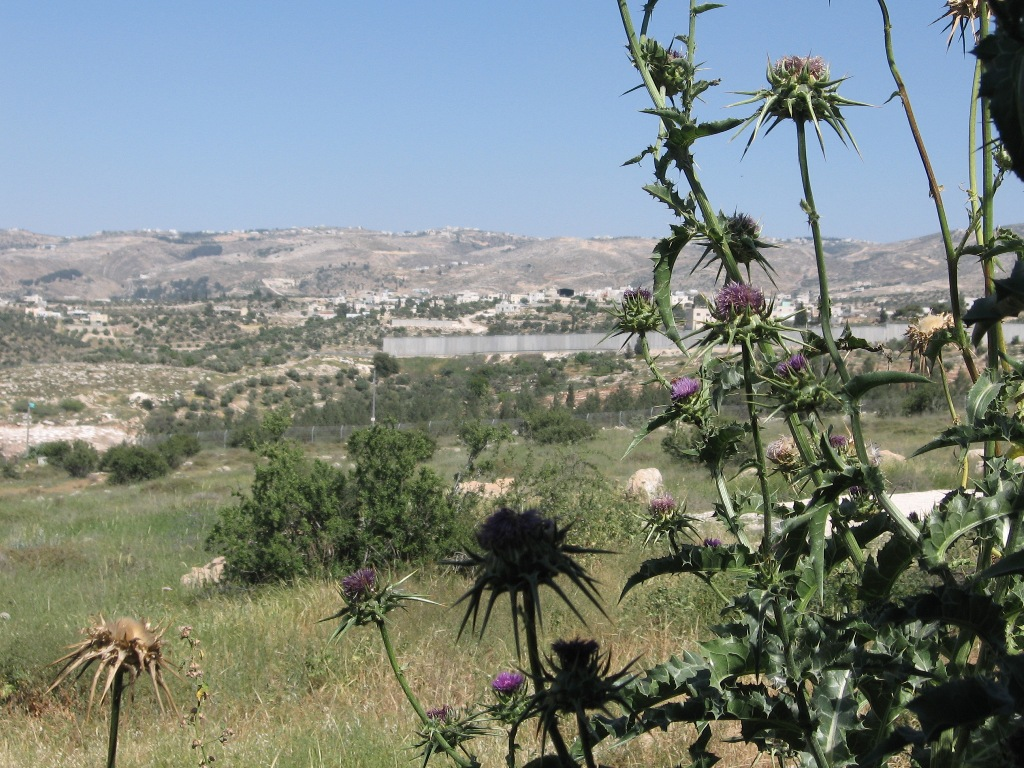
- Palestinian village of Beit Awwa opposite Shekef, across from West Bank Separation Wall

- Location within Ashkelon region of Israel Location within Israel
- Coordinates: 31°30′55″N 34°56′10″E
- Country: Israel
- District: Southern
- Subdistrict: Ashkelon
- Council: Lakhish
- Affiliation: Mishkei Herut Beitar
- Founded: 1981
- Founder: Herut movement
- Population (2024): 646

Shekef (Hebrew: שֶׁקֶף) is a moshav in south-central Israel. Located southeast of Kiryat Gat and west of Hebron, it falls under the jurisdiction of Lakhish Regional Council. In 2024 it had a population of 646.

== History ==
The village was founded by the Herut movement with Betar and assistance from the Jewish Agency in 1981 as part of the Star Villages Plan of Ariel Sharon in an attempt to inhabit the region around the Green Line for the extension of Jewish settlement in the line between Mount Hebron. About 500 meters east of the community, beyond the Israeli West Bank barrier, is the Palestinian village of Beit Awwa.

The moshav is located with a view in the border between the mountain and the desert and is found in a natural reserve. The moshav is surrounded by a natural forest and wildflowers. The moshav grows mainly grapes for eating and vegetables in greenhouses agriculture.

In 2006, a caravan village was founded within the moshav as a temporary settlement mainly for evacuees from Tel Katifa who lived in Gush Katif in the Gaza Strip until disengagement in 2005. The mixed community of religious and non-religious families are slated to receive land nearby on which a new village called "Mirsham" will be built.

The name "Shakaf" is taken from the older village Umm al-Shakaf, located near the current moshav.
