= Nir Hen =

Moshav in southern Israel

Nir Hen: נִיר חֵ"ן (Hebrew); نير حين (Arabic)
- Etymology: Meadow of the 58
- Location within Ashkelon region of Israel
- Coordinates: 31°36′35″N 34°42′55″E
- Country: Israel
- District: Southern
- Subdistrict: Ashkelon
- Council: Lakhish
- Affiliation: Moshavim Movement
- Founded: 1955–1956
- Founder: Jewish refugees from North Africa
- Population (2024): 707

Nir Hen (Hebrew: נִיר חֵ"ן, lit. Meadow of the 58 (ח"ן is 58 in Gematria)) is a moshav in south-central Israel. Located in Hevel Lakhish between Ashkelon and Kiryat Gat, it falls under the jurisdiction of Lakhish Regional Council. In 2024 it had a population of 707.

== History ==
The moshav was founded in 1956. Its name is in memory of the 58 passengers who traveled on El Al Flight 402 that was shot down over the skies of Bulgaria about a year before the community was founded. The community was originally settled by Jewish refugees from North Africa, and later other immigrants and native Israelis joined them.

== Notable residents ==
- Avri Ran
