= Revaha =

Revaha: רווחה (Hebrew); رفاحا (Arabic)
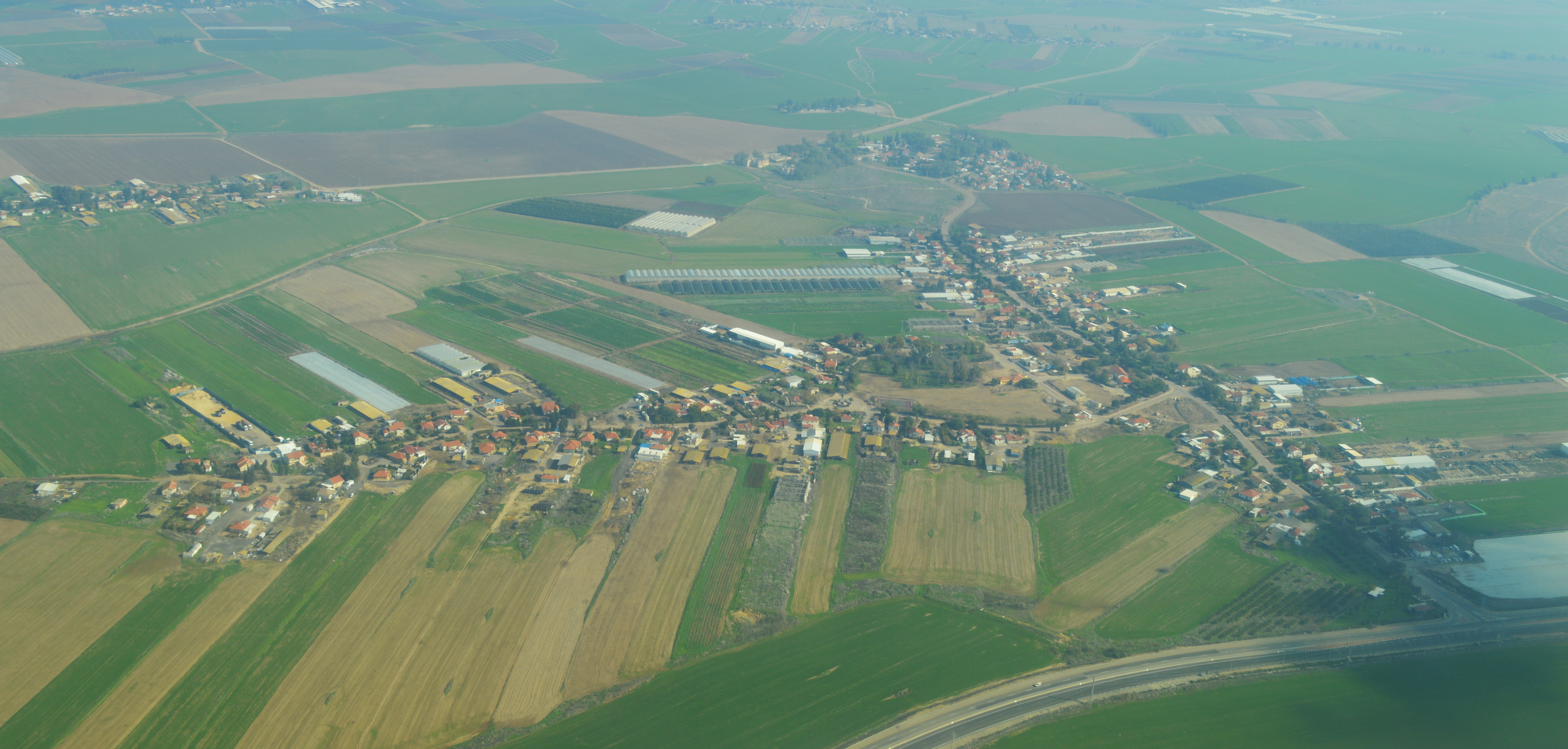

- Location within Ashkelon region of Israel
- Coordinates: 31°38′56″N 34°43′59″E
- Country: Israel
- District: Southern
- Subdistrict: Ashkelon
- Council: Shafir
- Affiliation: Hapoel HaMizrachi
- Founded: 1953
- Founder: Kurdish immigrants
- Population (2024): 708

Revaha (Hebrew: רְוָחָה, lit. prosperity) is a religious moshav in south-central Israel. Located in the southern Shephelah near Kiryat Gat, it falls under the jurisdiction of Shafir Regional Council. In 2024 it had a population of 708.

== History ==
Revaha was established in 1953 by Jewish immigrants from Kurdistan, on the land of the former depopulated Palestinian villages of Karatiyya and Hatta. The name of the moshav is derived both from the symbolic significance of the name itself and from the quote in Pirkei Avot 1:5: "Let thy house be wide open".

The majority of residents are national-religious.
