= Lakhish Regional Council =

Regional council in southern Israel

Coordinates: 31.567°N 34.850°E

Lakhish Regional Council מועצה אזורית לכיש
- Regional council (from 1956)

- Interactive map of Lakhish Regional Council
- Country: Israel
- District: Southern
- Subdistrict: Ashkelon
- Natural region: Lakhish, Malakhi

Government
  - Head of Municipality: Danny Morvia

Area
  - Total: 378,600 dunams (378.6 km^{2}; 146.2 sq mi)

Population (2024)
  - Total: 16,252
  - Density: 42.93/km^{2} (111.2/sq mi)
- Website: Official website

Lakhish Regional Council (Hebrew: מועצה אזורית לכיש, Mo'atza Azorit Lakhish) is a regional council in the Southern District of Israel. It surrounds the ancient city of Lakhish and the modern city of Kiryat Gat. It was founded in 1955. Today it includes 15 moshavim and one village, as listed below. As of 2008, three new communities are being built in eastern Lakhish, and some old communities are being expanded. Rabbis Shabtai Ben Hayyim and Ya'akov Alkabetz serve as rabbis of the council.

== List of villages ==
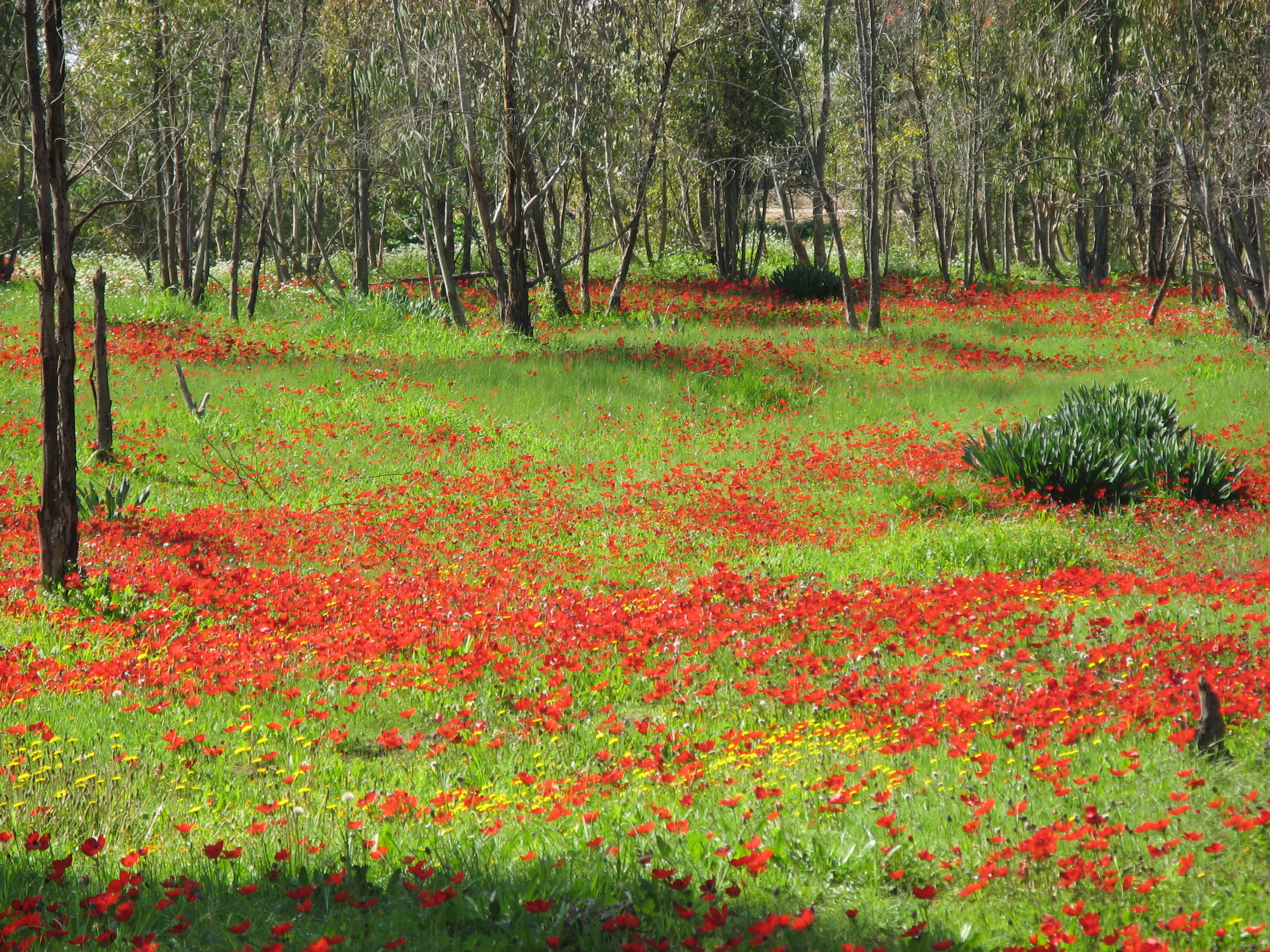
Red blossom near Kiryat Gat

The following villages are subject to the council. All are moshavim except Bnei Dekalim, Eliav and Neta.

- Ahuzam
- Amatzia
- Bnei Dekalim
- Haruv
- Lakhish
- Menuha
- Nir Hen
- Nehora
- Neta
- Noga
- Otzem
- Sde David
- Sde Moshe
- Shahar
- Shekef
- Tlamim
- Yad Natan
- Zohar

== Demographics ==
Historical population
Year	Pop.	±%
1972	5,300	—
1983	5,500	+3.8%
1995	5,300	−3.6%
2008	8,300	+56.6%
2022	15,061	+81.5%
2024	16,252	+7.9%

== Voting Patterns ==
In the 2022 election, 69 percent of voters in the regional council voted for the parties of the right-wing coalition led by Benjamin Netanyahu, while 31 percent voted for the parties of the center-left coalition led by Yair Lapid and 0.1 percent voted for the Arab parties.

In the 2026 election, 64 percent of voters in the regional council voted for the parties of the right-wing coalition led by Benjamin Netanyahu, while 29 percent voted for the parties of the center-left coalition led by Gadi Eisenkot and 0.1 percent voted for the Arab parties. An additional 3 percent voted for the Reservists, and 2.8 percent voted for Amcha Yisrael. Voter turnout increased 11 percent from the 2022 election.
