= Hevel Lakhish =

Region in Israel

Coordinates: 31°37′53″N 34°42′40″E

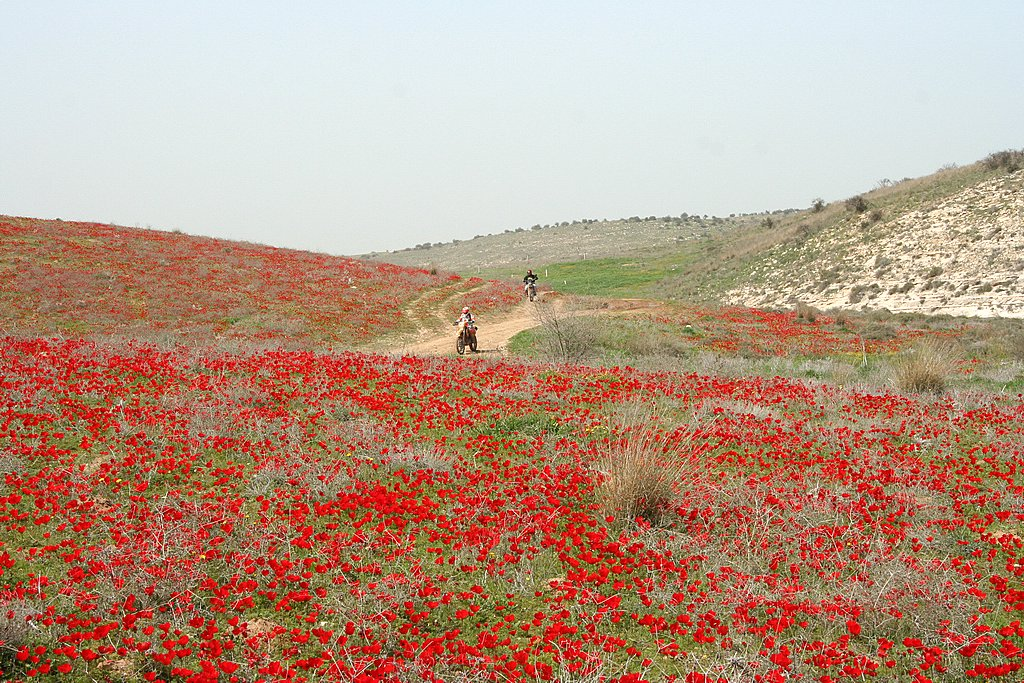
Poppy anemones in Hevel Lakish near Amatzia

Hevel Lakhish (Hebrew: חבל לכיש, lit. Lakhish Region) is an area of south-central Israel. Part of the southern Shephelah, it is located between the Judean Mountains and the Mediterranean Sea and is named after the Biblical city of Lachish.

== History ==
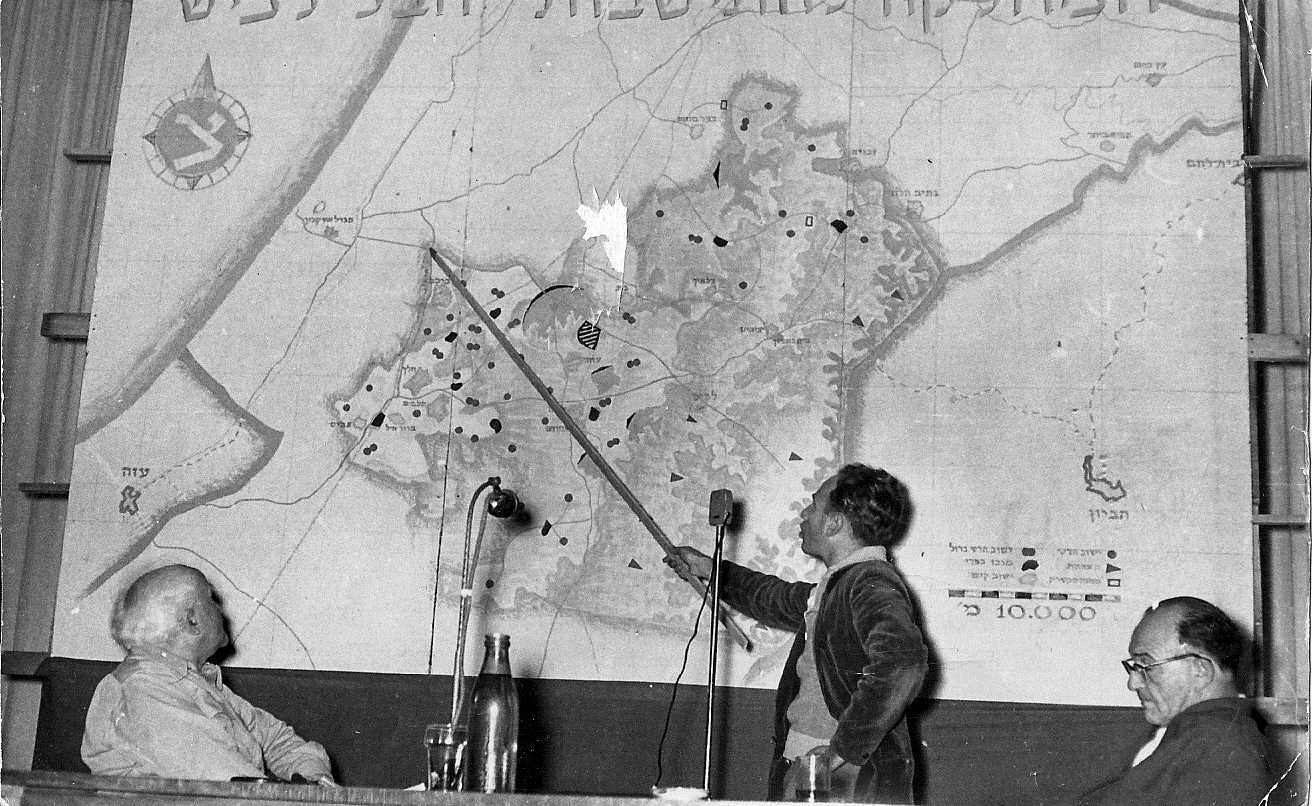
Lova Eliav presenting the Hevel Lakhish plan to David Ben-Gurion, 1954

In ancient times, the main road through the Lachish region ran from the port city of Gaza through Gath, Lachish, Maresha, Azekah, the Elah Valley and the Ayalon Valley before turning east through the Beit Horon Ascent, to the Hill Road and Jerusalem. A break-off road ran from Maresha to the Hill Road at Hebron.

Before the 1948 Arab-Israeli War, three kibbutzim were founded in the area - Gal On, Gat and Negba. Between 1955 and 1961 twenty more settlements were established. Lova Eliav was a driving force in the development of the region.

The area is covered by three regional councils - Lakhish, Shafir and Yoav - and one city council, Kiryat Gat. In the year 2009 70,200 people lived in the region, 100% of them Jews.

== See also ==
- Geography of Israel
