= Ashkelon Subdistrict =

Coordinates: 31.6658°N 34.5664°E

Ashkelon Subdistrict נפת אשקלון قضاء عسقلان / قضاء أشكلون
- Subdistrict
- Interactive map of Ashkelon Subdistrict
- Country: Israel
- District: Southern
- Largest city: Ashdod
- Capital: Ashkelon

Area
  - Total: 1,266 km^{2} (489 sq mi)

Population (2024)
  - Total: 628,684

Ethnicity
  - Jews and others: 96.3%
  - Arabs: 0.4%

The Ashkelon Subdistrict is the northern of the two sub-districts in Israel's Southern District. It had a population of 628,684 in 2024. It is an important region for manufacturing including electricity production and water desalination, agriculture, transportation, tourism, and trade.

Ashdod is the largest city in the subdistrict. The capital of the subdistrict, Ashkelon, is its second-largest city. Both are on the Mediterranean Sea. The other cities in the subdistrict, Kiryat Malakhi, Kiryat Gat, and Sderot, are smaller and located inland.

The subdistrict borders clockwise with the Rehovot Subdistrict in the north, the Jerusalem District and the West Bank in the east, the Beersheba Subdistrict in the south, and the Gaza Strip and the Mediterranean Sea in the west.

== History ==
During the British Mandate of Palestine, parts of the present-day subdistrict were in the Gaza, Hebron, and Beersheba subdistricts.

== Demographics ==
Historical population
Year	Pop.	±%
1972	155,100	—
1983	200,900	+29.5%
1995	323,200	+60.9%
2008	464,100	+43.6%
2022	592,092	+27.6%
2024	628,684	+6.2%

== Administrative local authorities ==
Cities	Local Councils	Regional Councils
Ashdod; Ashkelon; Kiryat Gat; Kiryat Malakhi; Sderot	[none]	Be'er Tuvia; Hof Ashkelon; Lakhish; Sha'ar HaNegev; Shafir; Yoav

== Transportation ==
The Israel Trail leads through the east of the subdistrict, generally in a north–south direction.

=== Roads ===
The subdistrict has 3 major north–south routes:

- Road 4 from Ashdod through Ashkelon to the Yad Mordechai Junction, from where most traffic continues over Road 34 to Sderot and Netivot (outside the subdistrict).
- Road 40 between Gedera (just outside the subdistrict), Kiryat Malakhi, and Kiryat Gat, connecting to Road 6 at the Maahaz Interchange
- Road 6 on the east side of the subdistrict.

Its 2 major east–west thoroughfares are:

- Road 3, connecting Kiryat Malakhi to Ashkelon.
- Road 35, between Road 6, Kiryat Gat, and Ashkelon.

=== Rail ===
Kiryat Malakhi, through a quite remote railway station, and Kiryat Gat are on the north–south railroad from Tel Aviv to Beersheba. Beersheba also has a rail connection through Ofakim and Netivot to Sderot, from where the line continues north to Ashkelon and Ashdod. Ashdod, in turn, has railway connections outside the subdistrict to Tel Aviv and Lod.

The east–west Heletz railway, between Kiryat Gat and Ashkelon, serves only freight. It was completed in 1985. Other freight tracks connect to the Port of Ashdod and to Rutenberg Power Station. Ashkelon has major maintenance facilities of Israel Railways.

As part of a comprehensive 2017 country-wide housing plan of the Ministry of Construction and Housing, the Ministry of Transport and Road Safety is planning a light rail and bus rapid transit system for the subdistrict and its peripheral area – Ashkelon Mass Transit System. The first draft was published in August 2020.

=== Sea ===
The subdistrict has a major seaport in Ashdod. Ashkelon has sea terminals for coal and oil.

Ashdod has two yacht harbors and Ashkelon has one.

== Voting Patterns ==
In the 2022 election, 68 percent of voters in the subdistrict voted for the parties of the right-wing coalition led by Benjamin Netanyahu, while 32 percent voted for the parties of the center-left coalition led by Yair Lapid. The Arab parties received a mere 0.1 percent of the vote.

In the 2026 election, 63 percent of voters in the subdistrict voted for the parties of the right-wing coalition led by Benjamin Netanyahu, while 31 percent voted for the parties of the center-left coalition led by Gadi Eisenkot and 0.2 percent voted for the Arab parties. An additional 3.3 percent voted for the Reservists, and 1.7 percent voted for Amcha Yisrael. Voter turnout increased 17 percent from the 2022 election.

== Natural Regions ==
Districts, Subdistricts and Natural Regions of the State of Israel, 2018

- 611 Mal'akhi
  - Population (2024): 71,300
  - Largest city: Kiryat Malakhi
- 612 Lakhish
  - Population (2024): 94,037
  - Largest city: Kiryat Gat
- 613 Ashdod
  - Population (2024): 228,562
  - Largest city: Ashdod
- 614 Ashkelon
  - Population (2024): 234,785
  - Largest city: Ashkelon
