= List of moshavim =

The following is a list of moshavim (Hebrew: מושבים) in Israel, which includes those that exist today, those that have been relocated and those that have been dismantled. As of 2018 there are a total of 451 moshavim in Israel. About 7.5% of them (34 moshavim) are considered "Moshavim Shitufiim" (מושבים שיתופיים).

== Moshavim considered "Moshav Ovdim" ==
Name	Hebrew	Founding year	Council	District
Adanim	עֲדָנִים	1950	Drom HaSharon	Central District
Aderet, Israel	אַדֶּרֶת	1961	Mateh Yehuda	Jerusalem District
Adirim	אַדִּירִים	1956	Gilboa	Northern District
Agur, Israel	עָגוּר	1950	Mateh Yehuda	Jerusalem District
Ahi'ezer	אֲחִיעֶזֶר	1950	Lod Valley	Central District
Ahihud	אֲחִיהוּד	1950	Mateh Asher	Northern District
Ahisamakh, Israel	אֲחִיסָמָךְ	1950	Hevel Modi'in	Central District
Ahituv	אֲחִיטוּב	1951	Emek Chefer	Central District
Ahuzam	אֲחֻזָּם	1950	Lachish	Southern District
Alma, Israel	עַלְמָה	1949	Merom HaGalil	Northern District
Almagor	אַלְמָגוֹר	1961	Emek HaYarden	Northern District
Amikam	עַמִּיקָם	1950	Alona	Haifa District
Aminadav	עַמִּינָדָב	1950	Mateh Yehuda	Jerusalem District
Ami'oz	עַמִּיעוֹז	1956	Eshkol	Southern District
Amirim	אֲמִירִים	1958	Merom HaGalil	Northern District
Amka	עַמְקָה	1949	Mateh Asher	Northern District
Amnun	אַמְנוּן	1983	Mevo'ot HaHermon	Northern District
Ani'am	אֲנִיעָם	1978	Golan	Northern District
Arbel	אַרְבֵּל	1949	Lower Galilee	Northern District
Argaman	אַרְגָּמָן	1968	Bik'at HaYarden	Judea and Samaria Area
Arugot	עֲרוּגוֹת	1949	Be'er Tuvia	Southern District
Avdon	עַבְדּוֹן	1952	Ma'ale Yosef	Northern District
Aviel	אֲבִיאֵל	1949	Alona	Haifa District
Aviezer	אֲבִיעֶזֶר	1958	Mateh Yehuda	Jerusalem District
Avigdor	אֲבִיגְדוֹר	1950	Be'er Tuvia	Southern District
Avihayil	אֲבִיחַיִל	1932	Emek Chefer	Central District
Avital	אֲבִיטַל	1953	Gilboa	Northern District
Avivim	אֲבִיבִים	1958	Merom HaGalil	Northern District
Avnei Eitan	אַבְנֵי אֵיתָן	1974–78	Golan	Northern District
Azaria	עֲזַרְיָה	1949	Gezer	Central District
Azri'el	עַזְרִיאֵל	1951	Lev HaSharon	Central District
Azrikam	עַזְרִיקָם	1950	Be'er Tuvia	Southern District
Balfouria	בַּלפוּרְיָה	1922	Jezreel Valley	Northern District
Bar Giora	בַּר גִּיּוֹרָא	1950	Mateh Yehuda	Jerusalem District
Barak, Israel	בָּרָק	1956	Gilboa	Northern District
Bareket	בַּרֶקֶת	1952	Hevel Modi'in	Central District
Bat Shlomo	בָּת שְׁלֹמֹה	1951	Hof HaCarmel	Haifa District
Batzra	בָּצְרָה	1946	Hof HaSharon	Central District
Be'er Milka	בְּאֵר מִלְכָּה	2006	Ramat HaNegev	Southern District
Be'er Tuvia	בְּאֵר טוֹבִיָּה	1930	Be'er Tuvia	Southern District
Be'erotayim	בְּאֵרוֹתַיִם	1949	Emek Chefer	Central District
Beit Arif	בֵּית עָרִיף	1949	Hevel Modi'in	Central District
Beit Elazari	בֵּית אֶלְעָזָרִי	1948	Brenner	Central District
Beit Ezra	בֵּית עֶזְרָא	1950	Be'er Tuvia	Southern District
Beit Gamliel	בֵּית גַּמְלִיאֵל	1949	Hevel Yavne	Central District
Beit HaGadi	בֵּית הַגָּדִי	1951	Sdot Negev	Southern District
Beit HaLevi	בֵּית הַלֵּוִי	1945	Emek Chefer	Central District
Beit Hanan	בֵּית חָנָן	1929	Gan Raveh	Central District
Beit Hanania	בֵּית חֲנַנְיָה	1950	Hof HaCarmel	Haifa District
Beit Herut	בֵּית חֵרוּת	1933	Emek Chefer	Central District
Beit Hilkia	בֵּית חִלְקִיָּה	1953	Nahal Sorek	Central District
Beit Hillel	בֵּית הִלֵּל	1940	Mevo'ot HaHermon	Northern District
Beit Meir	בֵּית מֵאִיר	1950	Mateh Yehuda	Jerusalem District
Beit Nehemia	בֵּית נְחֶמְיָה	1950	Hevel Modi'in	Central District
Beit Nekofa	בֵּית נְקוֹפָה	1949	Mateh Yehuda	Jerusalem District
Beit Oved	בֵּית עוֹבֵד	1933	Gan Raveh	Central District
Beit She'arim (moshav)	בֵּית שְׁעָרִים	1926	Jezreel Valley	Northern District
Beit Shikma	בֵּית שִׁקְמָה	1950	Hof Ashkelon	Southern District
Beit Uziel	בֵּית עוּזִיאֵל	1956	Gezer	Central District
Beit Yanai	בֵּית יַנַּאי	1933	Emek Chefer	Central District
Beit Yehoshua	בֵּית יְהוֹשֻעַ	1938	Hof HaSharon	Central District
Beit Yitzhak-Sha'ar Hefer	בֵּית יִצְחָק־שַׁעַר חֵפֶר	1963	Emek Chefer	Central District
Beit Yosef, Israel	בֵּית יוֹסֵף	1937	Valley of Springs	Northern District
Beit Zaid	בֵּית זַיְד	1951	Jezreel Valley	Northern District
Beit Zayit	בֵּית זַיִת	1949	Mateh Yehuda	Jerusalem District
Beka'ot	בְּקָעוֹת	1972	Bik'at HaYarden	Judea and Samaria Area
Beko'a	בְּקוֹעַ	1952	Mateh Yehuda	Jerusalem District
Ben Ami	בֶּן עַמִּי	1949	Mateh Asher	Northern District
Ben Shemen	בֶּן שֶׁמֶן	1952	Hevel Modi'in	Central District
Ben Zakai	בֶּן זַכַּאי	1950	Hevel Yavne	Central District
Berekhya	בֶּרֶכְיָה	1950	Hof Ashkelon	Southern District
Bethlehem of Galilee	בֵּית לֶחֶם הַגְּלִילִית	1948	Jezreel Valley	Northern District
Betzet	בֶּצֶת	1951	Mateh Asher	Northern District
Bitan Aharon	בִּיתַן אַהֲרֹן	1936	Emek Chefer	Central District
Bitkha	בִּטְחָה	1950	Merhavim	Southern District
Bitzaron	בִּצָּרוֹן	1935	Be'er Tuvia	Southern District
Bnaya	בְּנַיָה	1949	Brenner	Central District
Bnei Atarot	בְּנֵי עֲטָרוֹת	1948	Hevel Modi'in	Central District
Bnei Dror	בְּנֵי דְּרוֹר	1946	Lev HaSharon	Central District
Bnei Netzarim	בני נצרים	2008	Eshkol	Southern District
Bnei Re'em	בְּנֵי רְאֵ״ם	1947	Hof HaSharon	Central District
Bnei Zion	בְּנֵי צִיּוֹן	1949	Nahal Sorek	Central District
Brosh, Israel	בְּרוֹשׁ	1953	Bnei Shimon	Southern District
Burgata	בּוּרְגְתָא	1949	Emek Chefer	Central District
Bustan HaGalil	בֻּסְתַּן הַגָּלִיל	1948	Mateh Asher	Northern District
Dalton, Israel	דַּלְתּוֹן	1982	Eshkol	Southern District
Dekel	דֶּקֶל	1956	Gilboa	Northern District
Dishon	דִּישׁוֹן	1949	Hof HaCarmel	Haifa District
Dor, Israel	דּוֹר	1963	Merom HaGalil	Northern District
Dovev	דּוֹבֵ״ב	1955	Shafir	Southern District
Dvora, Israel	דְּבוֹרָה	1953	Mevo'ot HaHermon	Northern District
Ein Ayala	עֵין אַיָּלָה	1949	Hof HaCarmel	Haifa District
Ein HaBesor	עֵין הַבְּשׂוֹר	1982	Eshkol	Southern District
Ein Hatzeva	עֵין חֲצֵבָה	1960	Tamar	Southern District
Ein Iron	עֵין עִירוֹן	1934	Menashe	Haifa District
Ein Sarid	עֵין שָׂרִיד	1950	Lev HaSharon	Central District
Ein Tamar	עֵין תָּמָר	1982	Tamar	Southern District
Ein Vered	עֵין וֶרֶד	1930	Lev HaSharon	Central District
Ein Ya'akov	עֵין יַעֲקֹב	1953	Ma'ale Yosef	Northern District
Ein Yahav	עֵין יַהַב	1962	Central Arava	Southern District
Eitan, Israel	אֵיתָן	1960	Ma'ale Yosef	Northern District
Eliad, Golan Heights	אֵלִי־עַד	1968	Golan	Northern District
Eliakim	אליקים	1949	Megiddo	Northern District
Elifelet	אֱלִיפֶלֶט	1949	Mevo'ot HaHermon	Northern District
Elishama, Israel	אֱלִישָׁמָע	1950	Drom HaSharon	Central District
Elkosh	אֶלְקוֹשׁ	1949	Ma'ale Yosef	Northern District
Elyashiv	אֶלְיָשִׁיב	1933	Emek Chefer	Central District
Emunim	אֱמוּנִים	1950	Be'er Tuvia	Southern District
Eshbol	אֶשְׁבּוֹל	1954	Merhavim	Southern District
Eshtaol	אֶשְׁתָאוֹל	1949	Mateh Yehuda	Jerusalem District
Even Menachem	אֶבֶן מְנַחֵם	1950	Mateh Yehuda	Jerusalem District
Even Sapir	אֶבֶן סַפִּיר	1956	Gilboa	Northern District
Gadish	גָּדִישׁ	1935	Drom HaSharon	Central District
Gan HaDarom	גַּן הַדָּרוֹם	1934	Menashe	Haifa District
Gan Haim	גַּן חַיִּים	1953	Gederot	Central District
Gan HaShomron	גַּן השׁוֹמְרוֹן	1949	Emek Chefer	Central District
Gan Sorek	גַּן שׂוֹרֵק	1932	Drom HaSharon	Central District
Gan Yoshiya	גַּן יֹאשִׁיָּה	1950	Gan Raveh	Central District
Ganei Am	גַּנֵּי עַם	1956	Gezer	Central District
Ganei Tal	גַּנֵּי טַל	1950	Lod Valley	Central District
Ganei Yohanan	גַּנֵּי יוֹחָנָן	1950	Nahal Sorek	Central District
Ganot	גַּנּוֹת	1926	Drom HaSharon	Central District
Gat Rimon	גַּת רִמּוֹן	1949	Hof Ashkelon	Southern District
Ge'a	גֵּיאָה	1948	Gan Raveh	Central District
Ge'alya	גְּאַלְיָה	1948	Emek Chefer	Central District
Gefen	גֶּפֶן	1949	Hof HaCarmel	Haifa District
Geulei Teiman	גְּאֻלֵי תֵּימָן	1938	Lev HaSharon	Central District
Geulim	גְּאֻלִים	1955	Mateh Yehuda	Jerusalem District
Geva Carmel	גֶּבַע כַּרְמֶל	1933	Brenner	Central District
Gibton	גִּבְּתוֹן	1949	Merhavim	Southern District
Gilat	גִּילַת	1950	Hevel Modi'in	Central District
Gimzo	גִּמְזוֹ	1949	Hevel Modi'in	Central District
Ginaton	גִּנָּתוֹן	1972	Bik'at HaYarden	Judea and Samaria Area
Gitit, Bik'at HaYarden	גִּתִּית	1933	Drom HaSharon	Central District
Givat Hen	גִּבְעַת חֵ״ן	1933	Drom HaSharon	Central District
Giv'at Ko'ah	גִּבְעַת כֹּ״חַ	1953	Alona	Haifa District
Givat Nili	גִּבְעַת נִילִ״י	1958	Emek Chefer	Central District
Givat Shapira	גִּבְעַת שַׁפִּירָא	1950	Be'er Tuvia	Southern District
Giv'at Ye'arim	גִּבְעַת יְעָרִים	1958	Mateh Yehuda	Jerusalem District
Givat Yeshayahu	גִּבְעַת יְשַׁעְיָהוּ	1968	Golan	Northern District
Givat Yoav	גִּבְעַת יוֹאָב	1950	Hevel Modi'in	Central District
Giv'ati	גִּבְעָתִי	1952	Be'er Tuvia	Southern District
Givolim	גִּבְעוֹלִים	1950	Ma'ale Yosef	Northern District
Goren	גֹּרֶן	1933	Emek Chefer	Central District
Hadar Am	הֲדַר עָם	1949	Jezreel Valley	Northern District
Hadid	חָדִיד	1950	Hevel Modi'in	Central District
Hagor	חָגוֹר	1949	Drom HaSharon	Central District
Hamra, Bik'at HaYarden	חַמְרָה	1971	Bik'at HaYarden	Judea and Samaria Area
Haniel, Israel	חַנִּיאֵל	1950	Emek Chefer	Central District
Hatzav	חָצָב	1949	Be'er Tuvia	Southern District
Hatzeva	חֲצֵבָה	1965	Central Arava	Southern District
Havatzelet HaSharon	חֲבַצֶּלֶת הַשָּׁרוֹן	1946	Emek Chefer	Central District
HaYogev	הַיּוֹגֵב	1949	Emek HaYarden	Northern District
Hazon, Israel	חָזוֹן	1969	Merom HaGalil	Northern District
HaZor'im	הוֹדִיָּה	1949	Hof Ashkelon	Southern District
Heletz	חֶלֶץ	1950	Hof Ashkelon	Southern District
Hemed	חֶמֶד	1950	Lod Valley	Central District
Herev Le'et	חֶרֶב לְאֵת	1947	Emek Chefer	Central District
Herut, Israel	חֵרוּת	1930	Lev HaSharon	Central District
Hibat Tzion	חִבַּת צִיּוֹן	1933	Emek Chefer	Central District
Hodiya	חוֹסֶן	1949	Ma'ale Yosef	Northern District
Hogla, Israel	חָגְלָה	1933	Emek Chefer	Central District
Hosen	חֹסֶן	1950	Merom HaGalil	Northern District
Idan, Israel	עִדָּן	1980	Central Arava	Southern District
Ilaniya	אִילָנִיָּה	1949	Lower Galilee	Northern District
Kahal	כָּחָל	1980	Mevo'ot HaHermon	Northern District
Kanaf	כָּנָף	1985	Golan	Northern District
Kerem Ben Shemen	כֶּרֶם בֶּן שֶׁמֶן	1923	Hevel Modi'in	Central District
Kerem Ben Zimra	כֶּרֶם בֶּן זִמְרָה	1949	Merom HaGalil	Northern District
Kerem Maharal	כֶּרֶם מַהֲרַ״ל	1949	Hof HaCarmel	Haifa District
Kfar Ahim	כְּפַר אַחִים	1949	Be'er Tuvia	Southern District
Kfar Aviv	כְּפַר אָבִיב	1951	Gederot	Central District
Kfar Baruch	כְּפַר בָּרוּךְ	1926	Jezreel Valley	Northern District
Kfar Bialik	כְּפַר בְּיַאלִיק	1934	Zevulun	Haifa District
Kfar Bilu	כְּפַר בִּיל״וּ	1932	Gezer	Central District
Kfar Bin Nun	כְּפַר בִּן־נוּן	1952	Gezer	Central District
Kfar Gidon	כְּפַר גִּדְעוֹן	1923	Jezreel Valley	Northern District
Kfar Haim	כְּפַר חַיִּים	1933	Emek Chefer	Central District
Kfar HaNagid	כְּפַר הַנָּגִיד	1949	Gan Raveh	Central District
Kfar HaRif	כְּפַר הָרִי״ף	1956	Yoav	Southern District
Kfar Haroeh	כְּפַר הָרֹאֶ״ה	1933	Emek Chefer	Central District
Kfar Hasidim	כְּפַר חֲסִידִים	1924	Zevulun	Haifa District
Kfar Hess	כְּפַר הֶס	1931	Lev HaSharon	Central District
Kfar Hoshen	כְּפַר חוֹשֶׁן	1949	Merom HaGalil	Northern District
Kfar Kisch	כְּפַר קִישׁ	1946	Lower Galilee	Northern District
Kfar Ma'as	כְּפַר מַעַשׂ	1935	Drom HaSharon	Central District
Kfar Maimon	כְּפַר מַיְמוֹן	1959	Sdot Negev	Southern District
Kfar Malal	כְּפַר מַלָּ״ל	1922	Drom HaSharon	Central District
Kfar Monash	כְּפַר מוֹנַשׁ	1936	Emek Chefer	Central District
Kfar Mordechai	כְּפַר מָרְדְּכַי	1950	Gederot	Central District
Kfar Netter	כְּפַר נֶטֶר	1939	Hof HaSharon	Central District
Kfar Pines	כְּפַר פִּינֶס	1933	Menashe	Haifa District
Kfar Ruth	כְּפַר רוּת	1977	Hevel Modi'in	Central District
Kfar Shamai	כְּפַר שַׁמַּאי	1949	Merom HaGalil	Northern District
Kfar Shmuel	כְּפַר שְׁמוּאֵל	1950	Gezer	Central District
Kfar Sirkin	כְּפַר סִירְקִין	1933	Drom HaSharon	Central District
Kfar Truman	כְּפַר טְרוּמַן	1949	Hevel Modi'in	Central District
Kfar Uria	כְּפַר אוּרִיָּה	1949	Mateh Yehuda	Jerusalem District
Kfar Vitkin	כְּפַר וִיתְקִין	1930	Emek Chefer	Central District
Kfar Warburg	כפר־וַרְבּוּרְג	1939	Be'er Tuvia	Southern District
Kfar Yavetz	כְּפַר יַעֲבֵץ	1932	Lev HaSharon	Central District
Kfar Yedidia	כְּפַר יְדִידְיָה	1935	Emek Chefer	Central District
Kfar Yehezkel	כְּפַר יְחֶזְקֵאל	1921	Gilboa	Northern District
Kfar Yehoshua	כְּפַר יְהוֹשֻׁעַ	1927	Jezreel Valley	Northern District
Kfar Zeitim	כְּפַר זֵיתִים	1950	Lower Galilee	Northern District
Kidmat Tzvi	קִדְמַת צְבִי	1981	Golan	Northern District
Kidron, Israel	קִדְרוֹן	1949	Brenner	Central District
Klahim	קְלָחִים	1954	Merhavim	Southern District
Kmehin	כְּמֵהִין	1988	Ramat HaNegev	Southern District
Kokhav Michael	כּוֹכַב מִיכָאֵל	1950	Hof Ashkelon	Southern District
Komemiyut	קוֹמְמִיּוּת	1950	Shafir	Southern District
Ksalon	כְּסָלוֹן	1952	Mateh Yehuda	Jerusalem District
Lakhish, Israel	לָכִישׁ	1955	Lakhish	Southern District
Lapidot	לַפִּידוֹת	1978	Ma'ale Yosef	Northern District
Liman, Israel	לִימַן	1949	Mateh Asher	Northern District
Luzit	לוּזִית	1955	Mateh Yehuda	Jerusalem District
Ma'ale Gamla	מַעֲלֵה גַּמְלָא	1975	Golan	Northern District
Magen Shaul	מָגֵן שָׁאוּל	1976	Gilboa	Northern District
Magshimim	מַגְשִׁימִים	1949	Drom HaSharon	Central District
Mahseya	מַחְסֵיָה	1950	Mateh Yehuda	Jerusalem District
Manot, Israel	מָנוֹת	1980	Ma'ale Yosef	Northern District
Maor	מָאוֹר	1953	Menashe	Haifa District
Margaliot	מַרְגָּלִיּוֹת	1951	Mevo'ot HaHermon	Northern District
Mash'en	מַשְׁעֵן	1949	Hof Ashkelon	Southern District
Maslul	מַסְלוּל	1950	Merhavim	Southern District
Masua	מַשּׂוּאָה	1969	Bik'at HaYarden	Judea and Samaria Area
Mata, Israel	מַטָּע	1950	Mateh Yehuda	Jerusalem District
Matzliah	מַצְלִיחַ	1950	Gezer	Central District
Mavki'im	מַבְקִיעִים	1949	Hof Ashkelon	Southern District
Mazor	מָזוֹר	1949	Hevel Modi'in	Central District
Megadim	מְגָדִים	1949	Hof HaCarmel	Haifa District
Mehola	מחולה	1967	Bik'at HaYarden	Judea and Samaria Area
Mei Ami	מֵי עַמִּי	1963	Menashe	Haifa District
Meishar	מֵישָׁר	1950	Gederot	Central District
Meitav, Israel	מֵיטָב	1954	Gilboa	Northern District
Mekhora	מְכוֹרָה	1973	Bik'at HaYarden	Judea and Samaria Area
Menuha	מְנוּחָה	1953	Lachish	Southern District
Me'ona	מְעוֹנָה	1949	Ma'ale Yosef	Northern District
Merhavia (moshav)	מֶרְחַבְיָה	1922	Jezreel Valley	Northern District
Meron, Israel	מֵירוֹן	1949	Merom HaGalil	Northern District
Mesilat Zion	מְסִלַּת צִיּוֹן	1950	Mateh Yehuda	Jerusalem District
Mevo Modi'im	מְבוֹא מוֹדִיעִים	1976	Hevel Modi'in	Central District
Midrakh Oz	מִדְרַךְ עֹז	1952	Megiddo	Northern District
Mikhmoret	מִכְמֹרֶת	1945	Emek Chefer	Central District
Misgav Dov	מִשְׂגַּב דֹּב	1950	Gederot	Central District
Mishmar Ayalon	מִשְׁמַר אַיָּלוֹן	1949	Gezer	Central District
Mishmar HaShiv'a	מִשְׁמַר הַשִּׁבְעָה	1949	Lod Valley	Central District
Mishmar HaYarden	מִשְׁמַר הַיַּרְדֵּן	1956	Mevo'ot HaHermon	Northern District
Mishmeret	מִשְׁמֶרֶת	1946	Lev HaSharon	Central District
Mivtahim	מִבְטַחִים	1950	Eshkol	Southern District
Mle'a	מְלֵאָה	1956	Gilboa	Northern District
Mlilot	מְלִילוֹת	1953	Sdot Negev	Southern District
Moledet	מולדת	1937	Gilboa	Northern District
Nahala, Israel	נַחֲלָה	1953	Yoav	Southern District
Nahalal	נַהֲלָל	1921	Jezreel Valley	Northern District
Naham	נַחַם	1950	Mateh Yehuda	Jerusalem District
Na'omi	נָעֳמִי	1982	Bik'at HaYarden	Judea and Samaria Area
Natur, Golan Heights (Note: a former kibbutz that became a moshav in 2008)	נטור	1980	Golan	Northern District
Naveh, Israel	נוֹב	1974	Golan	Northern District
Nehalim	נְחָלִים	1952	Hevel Modi'in	Central District
Neot Golan	נְאוֹת גּוֹלָן	1968	Golan	Northern District
Neot HaKikar	נְאוֹת הַכִּכָּר	1973	Tamar	Southern District
Nes Harim	נֵס הָרִים	1950	Mateh Yehuda	Jerusalem District
Neta'im	נְטָעִים	1932	Gan Raveh	Central District
Netiv HaAsara	נְתִיב הָעֲשָׂרָה	1982	Hof Ashkelon	Southern District
Netiv HaGdud	נְתִיב הַגְּדוּד	1975	Bik'at HaYarden	Judea and Samaria Area
Netiv HaShayara	נְתִיב הַשַּׁיָּרָה	1950	Mateh Asher	Northern District
Netu'a	נְטוּעָה	1966	Ma'ale Yosef	Northern District
Nevatim	נְבָטִים	1946	Bnei Shimon	Southern District
Neve Ativ	נְוֵה אַטִי״ב	1972	Golan	Northern District
Neve Michael	נְוֵה מִיכָאֵל	1958	Mateh Yehuda	Jerusalem District
Neve Mivtah	נְוֵה מִבְטַח	1950	Be'er Tuvia	Southern District
Neve Yamin	נְוֵה יָמִין	1950	Drom HaSharon	Central District
Neve Yarak	נְוֵה יָרָק	1951	Drom HaSharon	Central District
Nir Akiva	נִיר עֲקִיבָא	1953	Merhavim	Southern District
Nir Banim	נִיר בָּנִים	1954	Be'er Tuvia	Southern District
Nir Hen	נִיר חֵ״ן	1955–56	Lachish	Southern District
Nir Moshe	נִיר מֹשֶׁה	1953	Merhavim	Southern District
Nir Tzvi	נִיר צְבִי	1954	Lod Valley	Central District
Nir Yafeh	ניר יפה	1956	Gilboa	Northern District
Nir Yisrael	נִיר יִשְׂרָאֵל	1949	Hof Ashkelon	Southern District
Nitzanei Oz	נִצָּנֵי עֹז	1951	Lev HaSharon	Central District
No'am	נֹעַם	1955	Shafir	Southern District
Noga, Israel	נֹגַהּ	1955	Lachish	Southern District
Nov, Golan Heights	נוֹב	1955	Lachish	Southern District
Ofer	עֹפֶר	1950	Hof HaCarmel	Haifa District
Ohad, Israel	אֹהַד	1969	Eshkol	Southern District
Olesh	עוֹלֵש	1951	Emek Chefer	Central District
Ometz, Israel	אוֹמֶץ	1949	Emek Chefer	Central District
Ora, Israel	אוֹרָה	1950	Mateh Yehuda	Jerusalem District
Orot	אוֹרוֹת	1952	Be'er Tuvia	Southern District
Otzem	עוֹצֶם	1955	Lachish	Southern District
Pa'amei Tashaz	פַעֲמֵי תַּשַ״ז	1953	Merhavim	Southern District
Paran, Israel	פָארָן	1971	Central Arava	Southern District
Patish	פַּטִּישׁ	1950	Merhavim	Southern District
Pedaya	פְּדָיָה	1951	Gezer	Central District
Peduim	פְּדוּיִים	1950	Merhavim	Southern District
Peki'in HaHadasha	פְּקִיעִין החֲדָשָׁה	1955	Ma'ale Yosef	Northern District
Petahya	פְּתַחְיָה	1951	Gezer	Central District
Petza'el	פְּצָאֵל	1970	Bik'at HaYarden	Judea and Samaria Area
Porat	פּוֹרָת	1950	Lev HaSharon	Central District
Prazon	פְּרָזוֹן	1953	Gilboa	Northern District
Pri Gan	פְּרִי גַּן	1981	Eshkol	Southern District
Ramat Raziel	רָמַת רָזִיאֵל	1942	Gilboa	Northern District
Ramat Tzvi	רָמַת צְבִי	1953	Gilboa	Northern District
Ram-On	רָם אוֹן	1948	Mateh Yehuda	Jerusalem District
Ramot Meir	רָמוֹת מֵאִיר	1945	Mevo'ot HaHermon	Northern District
Ramot Naftali	רָמוֹת נַפְתָּלִי	1969	Golan	Northern District
Ramot, Golan Heights	רָמוֹת	1949	Gezer	Central District
Ranen	רַנֵּן	1950	Merhavim	Southern District
Rehov	רְחֹוב	1951	Valley of Springs	Northern District
Reihan	רֵיחָן	1981	Shomron	Judea and Samaria Area
Revaha	רְוָחָה	1953	Shafir	Southern District
Revaya	רְוָיָה	1952	Valley of Springs	Northern District
Rinatya	רִנַּתְיָה	1949	Hevel Modi'in	Central District
Rishpon	רִשְׁפּוֹן	1936	Hof HaSharon	Central District
Ro'i	רוֹעִ״י	1976	Bik'at HaYarden	Judea and Samaria Area
Sal'it	סלעית	1979	Shomron	Judea and Samaria Area
Sde David	שְׂדֵה דָּוִד	1955	Lachish	Southern District
Sde Eliezer	שְׂדֵה אֱלִיעֶזֶר	1952	Mevo'ot HaHermon	Northern District
Sde Ilan	שְׂדֵה אִילָן	1949	Lower Galilee	Northern District
Sde Moshe	שְׂדֵה מֹשֶׁה	1956	Lachish	Southern District
Sde Nitzan	שְׂדֵה נִצָּן	1973	Eshkol	Southern District
Sde Tzvi	שְׂדֵה צְבִי	1953	Merhavim	Southern District
Sde Uziyahu	שְׂדֵה עוֹזִיָּהוּ	1950	Be'er Tuvia	Southern District
Sde Warburg	שְׂדֵה וַרְבּוּרְג	1938	Drom HaSharon	Central District
Sde Ya'akov	שְׂדֵה יַעֲקֹב	1927	Jezreel Valley	Northern District
Sde Yitzhak	שְׂדֵה יִצְחָק	1951	Menashe	Haifa District
Sdei Avraham	שְׂדֵי אַבְרָהָם	1981	Eshkol	Southern District
Sdei Hemed	שְׂדֵי חֶמֶד	1952	Drom HaSharon	Central District
Sdei Trumot	שְׂדֵי תְרוּמוֹת	1951	Valley of Springs	Northern District
Sdot Micha	שְׂדוֹת מִיכָה	1955	Mateh Yehuda	Jerusalem District
Sgula	סְגֻלָּה	1950	Lod Valley	Central District
Sha'al	שעל	1976	Golan	Northern District
Sha'ar Efraim	שַׁעַר אֶפְרַיִם	1953	Lev HaSharon	Central District
Shadmot Dvora	שדמות דבורה	1939	Lower Galilee	Northern District
Shafir	שפיר	1949	Shafir	Southern District
Shahar, Israel	שחר	1955	Lakhish	Southern District
Shalva	שלווה	1952	Shafir	Southern District
Sharona	שרונה	1938	Lower Galilee	Northern District
Sharsheret, Israel	שרשרת	1951	Sdot Negev	Southern District
Shdema	שְׁדֵמָה	1954	Gederot	Central District
She'ar Yashuv	שְׁאָר יָשׁוּב	1940	Mevo'ot HaHermon	Northern District
Shefer	שֶׁפֶר	1950	Merom HaGalil	Northern District
Shekef	שֶׁקֶף	1981	Lachish	Southern District
Shezor	שְׁזוֹר	1953	Merom HaGalil	Northern District
Shibolim	שִׁבֳּלִים	1952	Sdot Negev	Southern District
Shilat	שִׁילָּת	1977	Hevel Modi'in	Central District
Sho'eva	שׁוֹאֵבָה	1950	Mateh Yehuda	Jerusalem District
Shokeda	שׁוֹקֵדָה	1957	Sdot Negev	Southern District
Shomera	שׁוֹמֵרָה	1949	Ma'ale Yosef	Northern District
Shtula	שְׁתוּלָה	1967	Ma'ale Yosef	Northern District
Shtulim	שְׁתוּלִים	1950	Be'er Tuvia	Southern District
Shuva	שׁוּבָה	1950	Sdot Negev	Southern District
Sitria	סִתְרִיָה	1949	Gezer	Central District
Ta'ashur	תְּאַשּׁוּר	1953	Bnei Shimon	Southern District
Tal Shahar	טַל שַׁחַר	1948	Mateh Yehuda	Jerusalem District
Talmei Bilu	תַּלְמֵי בִּיל״וּ	1953	Merhavim	Southern District
Talmei Elazar	תַּלְמֵי אֶלְעָזָר	1952	Menashe	Haifa District
Talmei Eliyahu	תַּלְמֵי אֵלִיָּהוּ	1970	Eshkol	Southern District
Talmei Menashe	תלמי מנשה	1953	Be'er Ya'akov local council	Central District
Talmei Yehiel	תַּלְמֵי יְחִיאֵל	1949	Be'er Tuvia	Southern District
Talmei Yosef	תַּלְמֵי יוֹסֵף	1982	Eshkol	Southern District
Ta'oz	תָּעוֹז	1950	Mateh Yehuda	Jerusalem District
Tarum	תָּרוּם	1950	Mateh Yehuda	Jerusalem District
Tefahot	טְפָחוֹת	1980	Merom HaGalil	Northern District
Tel Adashim	תֵּל עֲדָשִׁים	1923	Jezreel Valley	Northern District
Tidhar	תִּדְהָר	1953	Bnei Shimon	Southern District
Tifrah	תִּפְרַח	1950	Merhavim	Southern District
Tirat Yehuda	טִירַת יְהוּדָה	1949	Hevel Modi'in	Central District
Tirosh	תִּירוֹשׁ	1955	Mateh Yehuda	Jerusalem District
Tkuma, Israel	תְּקוּמָה	1946	Sdot Negev	Southern District
Tlamim	תְּלָמִים	1950	Lakhish	Southern District
Tnuvot	תְּנוּבוֹת	1952	Lev HaSharon	Central District
Tomer	תּוֹמֶר	1976	Bik'at HaYarden	Judea and Samaria Area
Tzafria	צַפְרִיָּה	1949	Lod Valley	Central District
Tzafririm	צַפְרִירִים	1958	Mateh Yehuda	Jerusalem District
Tzelafon	צְלָפוֹן	1950	Mateh Yehuda	Jerusalem District
Tzofar	צוֹפָר	1975	Central Arava	Southern District
Tzofit	צוֹפִית	1933	Drom HaSharon	Central District
Tzrufa	צְרוּפָה	1949	Hof HaCarmel	Haifa District
Tzur Moshe	צוּר מֹשֶׁה	1937	Lev HaSharon	Central District
Tzuriel	צוּרִיאֵל	1950	Ma'ale Yosef	Northern District
Udim	אוּדִים	1948	Hof HaSharon	Central District
Uza, Israel	עוּזָה	1950	Shafir	Southern District
Vered Yeriho	וֶרֶד יְרִיחוֹ	1979	Megilot	Judea and Samaria Area
Ya'ad, Israel	יַעַד	1974	Misgav	Northern District
Ya'ara	יַעֲרָה	1950	Ma'ale Yosef	Northern District
Yad Natan	יַד נָתָן	1953	Lakhish	Southern District
Yad Rambam	יַד רַמְבַּ״ם	1955	Gezer	Central District
Yafit	יַפִית	1980	Bik'at HaYarden	Judea and Samaria Area
Yagel	יָגֵל	1950	Lod Valley	Central District
Yakhini	יָכִינִי	1950	Sha'ar HaNegev	Southern District
Yanuv	יָנוּב	1950	Lev HaSharon	Central District
Yardena	יַרְדֵּנָה	1952	Valley of Springs	Northern District
Yarhiv	יַרְחִיב	1949	Drom HaSharon	Central District
Yarkona	יַרְקוֹנָה	1932	Drom HaSharon	Central District
Yashresh	יַשְׁרֵשׁ	1950	Gezer	Central District
Yated, Israel	יָתֵד	1982	Eshkol	Southern District
Yatzitz	יָצִיץ	1950	Gezer	Central District
Yesha, Israel	יֵשַׁע	1957	Eshkol	Southern District
Yevul	יְבוּל	1981	Eshkol	Southern District
Yinon	יִנּוֹן	1952	Be'er Tuvia	Southern District
Yish'i	יִשְׁעִי	1950	Mateh Yehuda	Jerusalem District
Yoshivia	יוֹשִׁבְיָה	1950	Sdot Negev	Southern District
Yuval	יוּבַל	1953	Mevo'ot HaHermon	Northern District
Zanoah	זָנוֹחַ	1950	Mateh Yehuda	Jerusalem District
Zar'it	זַרְעִית	1967	Ma'ale Yosef	Northern District
Zavdiel	זַבְדִיאֵל	1950	Shafir	Southern District
Zeitan	זֵיתָן	1953	Yoav	Southern District
Zekharia	זְכָרְיָּה	1950	Mateh Yehuda	Jerusalem District
Zimrat	זִמְרָת	1957	Sdot Negev	Southern District
Zippori	צִפּוֹרִי	1949	Jezreel Valley	Northern District
Zohar, Israel	זוֹהַר	1956	Lachish	Southern District
Zrahia	זְרַחְיָה	1950	Shafir	Southern District
Zru'a	זְרוּעָה	1953	Shafir	Southern District

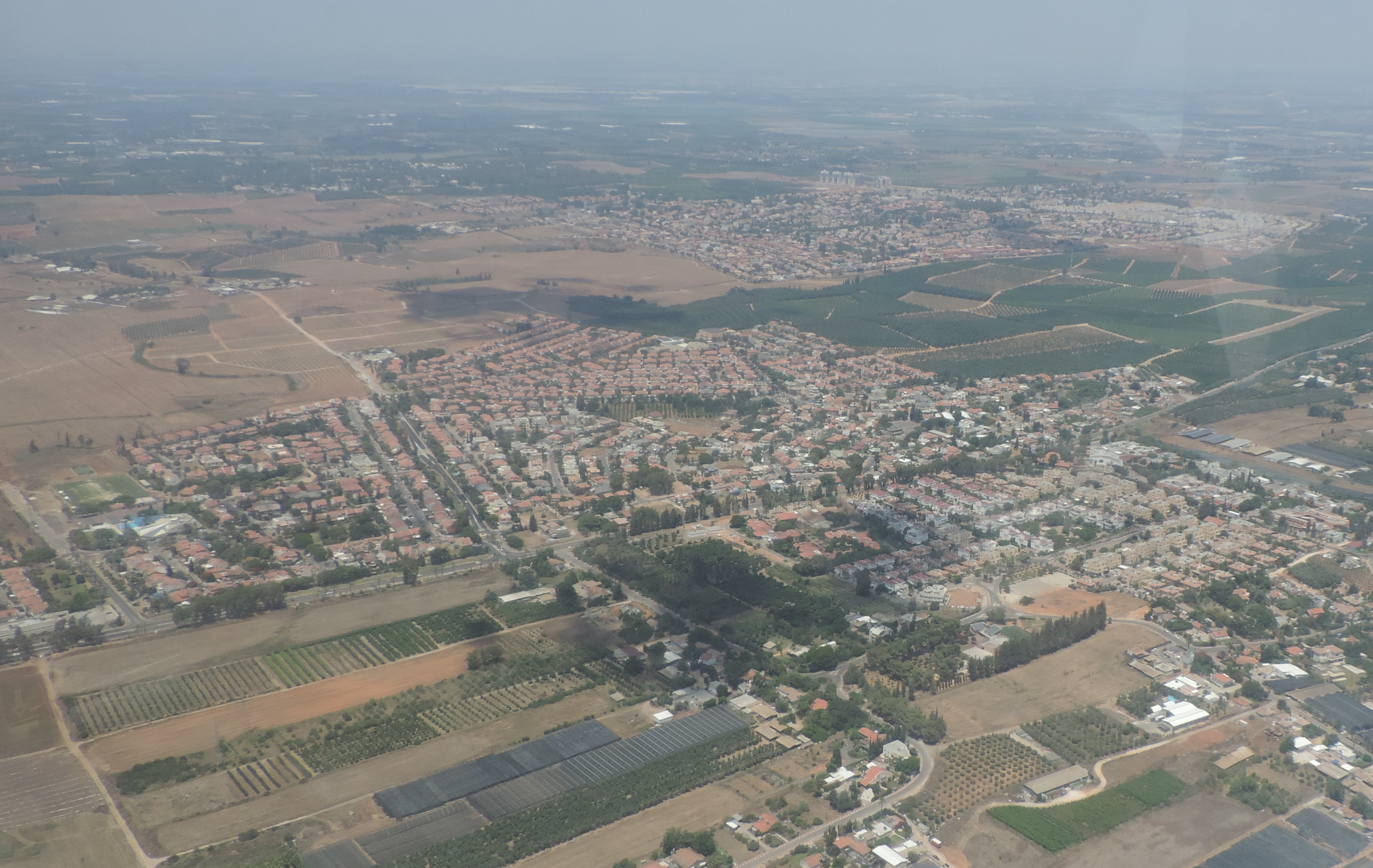
Tzur Moshe is most populated moshav nowadays in Israel (3,375 residents as of 2017)

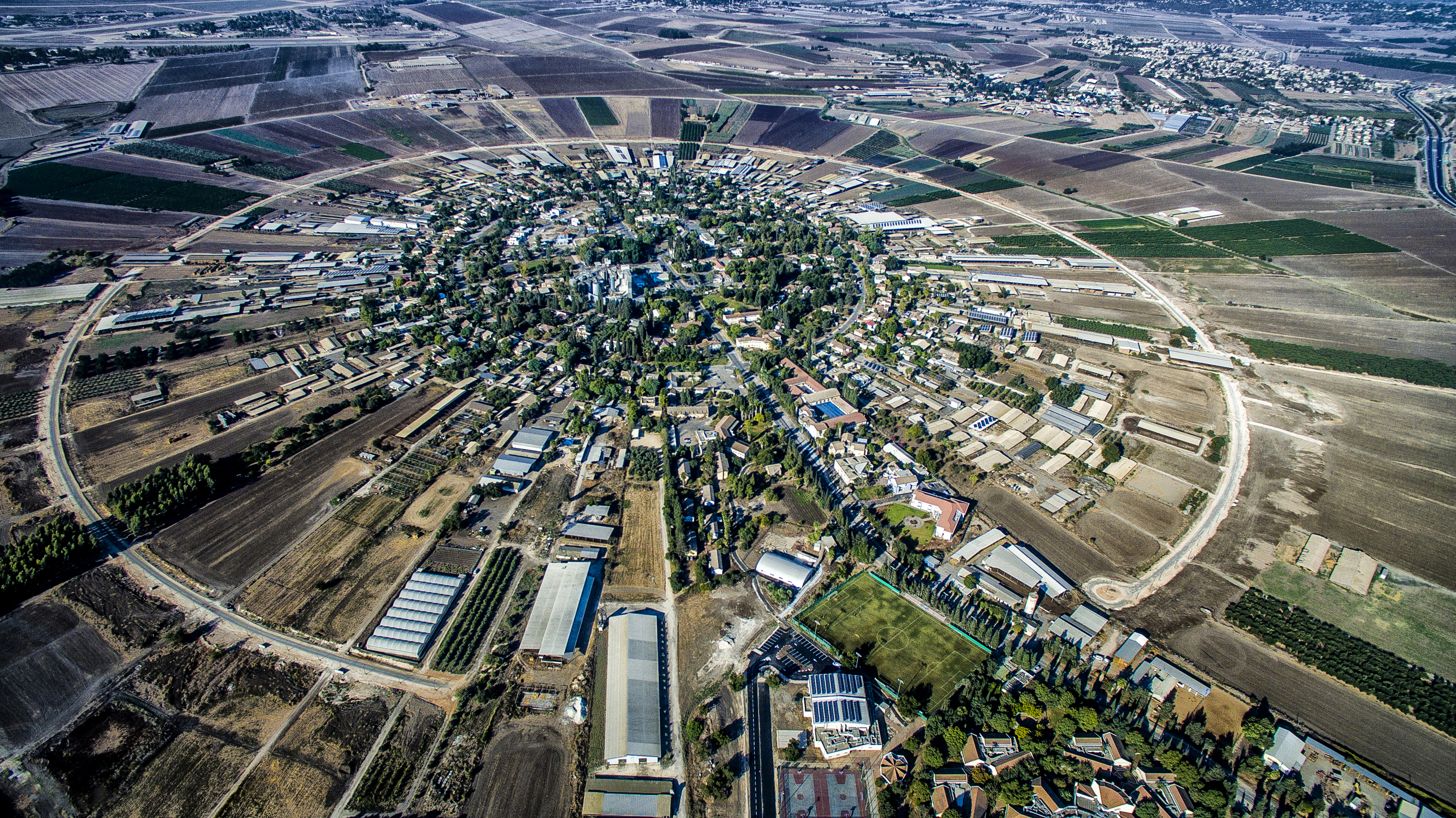
Nahalal, which was founded in 1921, was the first Moshav to be established in Mandatory Palestine by the Yishuv (as well as the first "Moshav Ovdim")

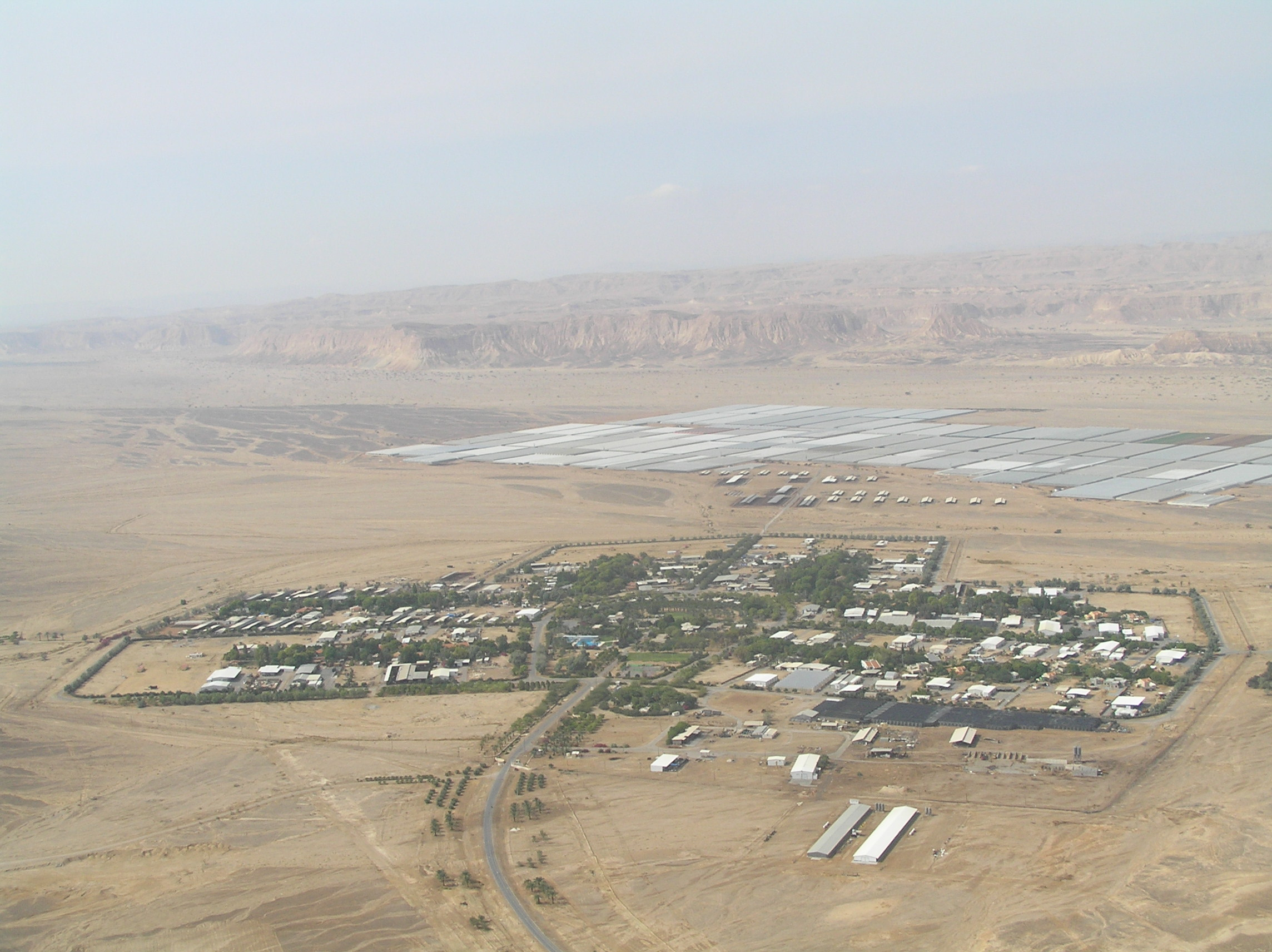
Paran is the southernmost Moshav in Israel

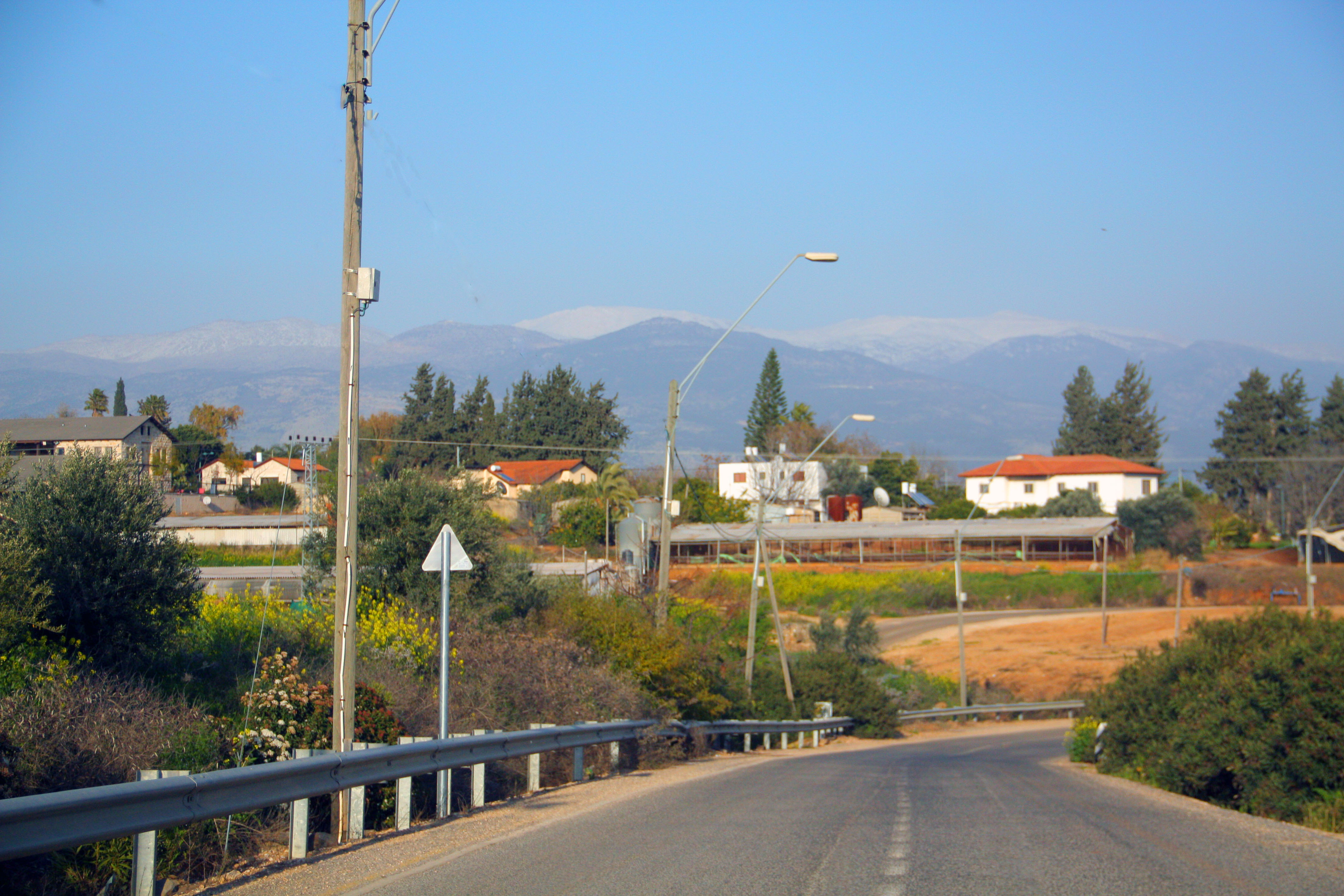
Yuval is the northernmost moshav in Israel

== Moshavim considered "Moshav Shitufi" ==
Name	Hebrew	Founding year	Council	District	Comments
Alonei Abba	אַלּוֹנֵי אַבָּא	1948	Jezreel Valley	Northern District	
Alonei HaBashan	אַלּוֹנֵי הַבָּשָׁן	1981	Golan	Northern District	
Amatzia	אֲמַצְיָה	1955	Lachish	Southern District	privatized
Beit Yatir	בֵּית יַתִּיר	1980	Har Hebron	Judea and Samaria Area	
Bnei Darom	בְּנֵי דָּרוֹם	1949	Hevel Yavne	Central District	privatized in 2015
Carmel	כַּרְמֶל	1980	Har Hebron	Judea and Samaria Area	
HaBonim	הַבּוֹנִים	1949	Hof HaCarmel	Haifa District	
Har Amasa	הַר עמשָא	1983	Tamar	Southern District	
Keshet	קֶשֶׁת	1974	Golan	Northern District	
Kfar Daniel	כְּפַר דָּנִיֵּאל	1949	Hevel Modi'in	Central District	
Kfar Hittim	כְּפַר חִטִּים	1924	Lower Galilee	Northern District	
Ma’on	מָעוֹן	1981	Har Hebron	Judea and Samaria Area	
Masu'ot Yitzhak	מַשּׂוּאוֹת יִצְחָק	1949	Shafir	Southern District	
Mevo Horon	מְבוֹא חוֹרוֹן	1970	Mateh Binyamin	Judea and Samaria Area	
Mevo Beitar	מְבוֹא בֵּיתָר	1950	Mateh Yehuda	Jerusalem District	
Moledet	מוֹלֶדֶת	1937	Gilboa	Northern District	
Na'ama	נעמה	1982	Bik'at HaYarden	Judea and Samaria Area	
Neve Ilan	נְוֵה אִילָן	1971	Mateh Yehuda	Jerusalem District	
Nir Galim	נִיר גַּלִּים	1949	Hevel Yavne	Central District	
Nir Etzion	נִיר עֶצִיוֹן	1950	Hof HaCarmel	Haifa District	
Nordiya	נוֹרְדִיָּה	1948	Lev HaSharon	Central District	
Odem	אֹדֶם	1981	Golan	Northern District	ceased to be a moshav shitufi in 2014
Ramat Magshimim	רָמַת מַגְשִׁימִים	1972	Golan	Northern District	
Regba	רֶגְבָּה	1946	Mateh Asher	Northern District	
Shadmot Mehola	שַׁדְמוֹת מְחוֹלָה	1967	Bik'at HaYarden	Judea and Samaria Area	
Shavei Tzion	שָׁבֵי צִיּוֹן	1938	Mateh Asher	Northern District	
Shoresh	שׁוֹרֶשׁ	1948	Mateh Yehuda	Jerusalem District	
Talmei Yaffe	תַּלְמֵי יָפֶה	1950	Hof Ashkelon	Southern District	
Timorim	תִּמּוֹרִים	1954	Be'er Tuvia	Southern District	
Tzur Natan	צוּר נָתָן	1966	Drom HaSharon	Central District	
Yad HaShmona	יַד הַשְּׁמוֹנָה	1971	Mateh Yehuda	Jerusalem District	
Yitav	יִיטַ״ב	1970	Bik'at HaYarden	Judea and Samaria Area	
Yesodot	יְסוֹדוֹת	1948	Nahal Sorek	Central District	
Yodfat	יוֹדְפַת	1960	Misgav	Northern District	
Yonatan	יוֹנָתָן	1975–78	Golan	Northern District	privatized

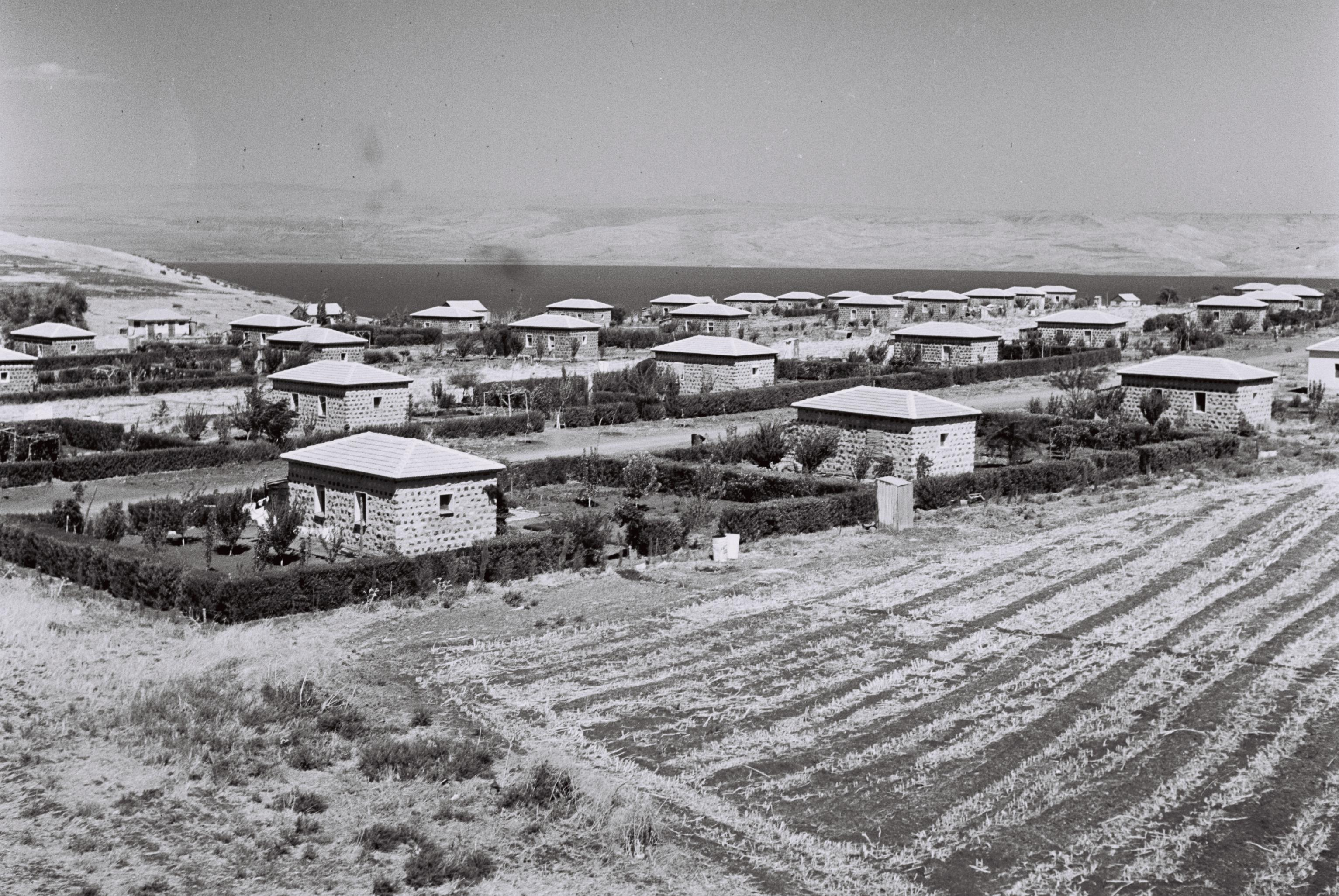
Kfar Hittim, which was founded in 1924, was the first moshav shitufi to be established in Mandatory Palestine by the Yishuv

== Former moshavim ==
=== Moshavim that became community settlements ===
Name	Hebrew	Founding year	Council	District	The year in which it ceased to be a moshav	Comments
Ashalim	אֲשָׁלִים	1979	Ramat HaNegev	Southern District	early 2000s	
Elazar	אֶלְעָזָר	1975	Gush Etzion	Judea and Samaria Area	1988	
Nehusha	נְחוּשָׁה	1955	Ramat HaNegev	Jerusalem District	1994	
Shorashim	שָׁרָשִׁים	1985	Misgav	Northern District	1992/3	

=== Moshavim that were merged to another municipality ===
Name	Hebrew	Founding year	District	The year in which it ceased to be a moshav	Comments
Ein Ganim	עין גנים	1908	Central District	1937	The moshav became part of Petah Tikva in 1937
Ganei Yehuda	גני יהודה	1950	Central District	2003	The moshav became part of Savyon in 2003
Mishmar HaShlosha	משמר השלושה	1937	Northern District	1953	The moshav became part of the Yavne'el local council in 1953
Kfar Avraham	כפר אברהם	1932	Central District	1952	The moshav became part of Petah Tikva in 1952
Kfar Azar	כפר אז״ר	1932	Central District	2008	The moshav became part of Ramat Gan in 2008

=== Moshavim that were dismantled ===
Out of the few moshavim that were dismantled in Israel's history (listed in this section), a certain portion of them has been subsequently re-established elsewhere in Israel. For those rare instances this article includes two different items - an item for the original moshav that was dismantled (listed in this section) as well as an item for the moshav that was later on re-established with the same name and/or other name.

Name	Hebrew	Founding year	Council	District	The year in which it ceased to be a moshav	Comments
Katif	קטיף	1985	Gush Katif		2005	The residents of Katif were forcibly evicted from their homes on 17 August 2005 as part of the Israel's unilateral disengagement plan and the moshav was destroyed once the evictions were complete.
Bnei Atzmon	בְּנֵי עַצְמוֹן	1979	Gush Katif		2005	The residents of Bnei Atzmon were forcibly evicted from their homes on 17 August 2005 as part of the Israel's unilateral disengagement plan and the moshav was destroyed once the evictions were complete.
Gan Or	גַּן אוֹר	1983	Gush Katif		2005	The residents of Gan Or were forcibly evicted from their homes on 17 August 2005 as part of the Israel's unilateral disengagement plan and the moshav was destroyed once the evictions were complete.
Gadid	גָּדִיד	1982	Gush Katif		2005	The residents of Gadid were forcibly evicted from their homes on 17 August 2005 as part of the Israel's unilateral disengagement plan and the moshav was destroyed once the evictions were complete.
Netzer Hazani, Hof Aza	נצר חזני	1997	Gush Katif		2005	The residents of Netzer Hazani were forcibly evicted from their homes on 17 August 2005 as part of the Israel's unilateral disengagement plan and the moshav was destroyed once the evictions were complete.
Morag	מורג	1983	Gush Katif		2005	The residents of Morag were forcibly evicted from their homes on 17 August 2005 as part of the Israel's unilateral disengagement plan and the moshav was destroyed once the evictions were complete.
Ganei Tal, Hof Aza	גַּנֵּי טַל	1979	Gush Katif		2005	The residents of Ganei Tal were forcibly evicted from their homes on 17 August 2005 as part of the Israel's unilateral disengagement plan and the moshav was destroyed once the evictions were complete. A new village called Ganei Tal was later established in central Israel by the former settlers.
Netiv HaAsara, Sinai	נְתִיב הָעֲשָׂרָה	1975	Sinai Peninsula		1982	The moshav was evacuated in 1982 as a result of the Egypt–Israel peace treaty. 70 families who had previously lived in the settlement founded a new moshav, also called Netiv HaAsara in the north-western Negev desert.
Pri'el, Sinai	פריאל	1978	Sinai Peninsula		1982	The moshav was evacuated in 1982 as a result of the Egypt–Israel peace treaty.

== See also ==
- List of kibbutzim
