= Even Shmuel =

Village in southern Israel

Even Shmuel: אֶבֶן שְׁמוּאֵל (Hebrew); إيفن شموئيل (Arabic)
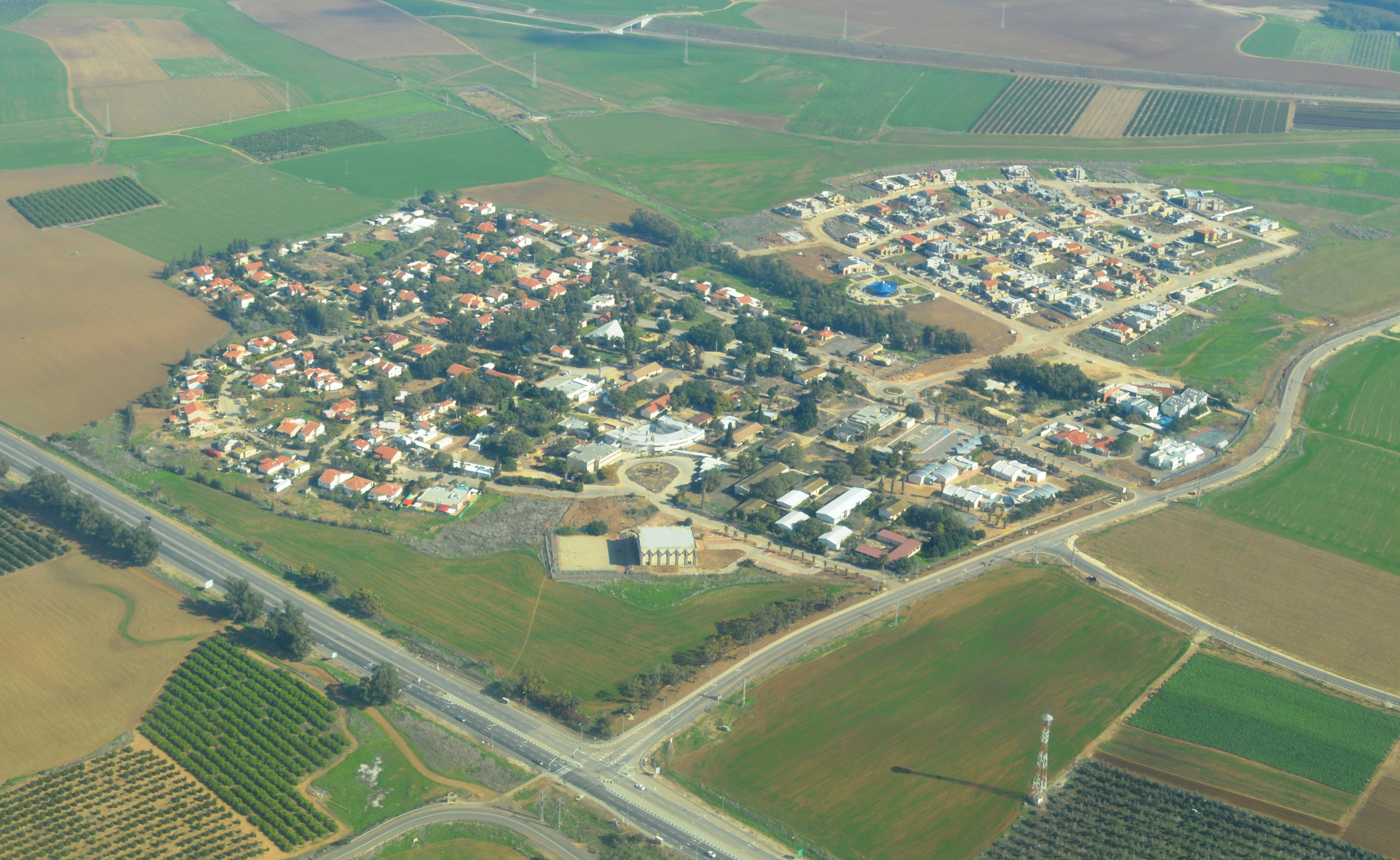

- Location within Ashkelon region of Israel
- Coordinates: 31°34′31″N 34°45′46″E
- Country: Israel
- District: Southern
- Subdistrict: Ashkelon
- Council: Shafir
- Founded: 1956
- Population (2024): 2,007
- Website: http://www.geocities.com/even_shmuel/index.html

Even Shmuel (Hebrew: אֶבֶן שְׁמוּאֵל, lit. Stone of Samuel) is a religious Zionist village in southern Israel. Located around four kilometres south of Kiryat Gat, it falls under the jurisdiction of Shafir Regional Council. In 2024 it had a population of 2,007.

== History ==
The village was originally founded as an agricultural moshav. In 2013, the village population expanded eastward, converting agricultural lands into a residential neighborhood of an additional 280 households.
