= No'am =

Moshav in southern Israel

No'am: נועם (Hebrew)
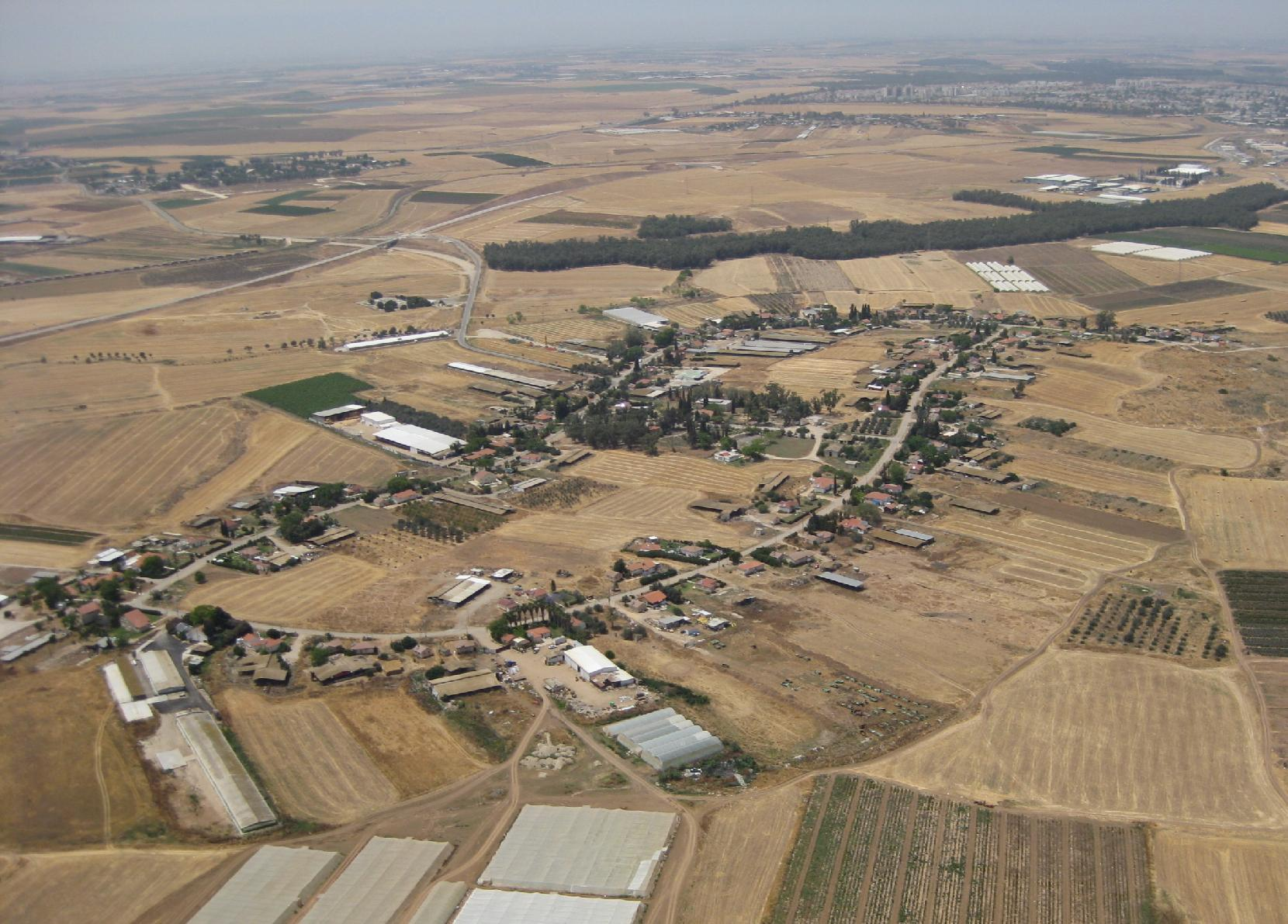

- Location within Ashkelon region of Israel
- Coordinates: 31°34′2″N 34°47′20″E
- Country: Israel
- District: Southern
- Subdistrict: Ashkelon
- Council: Shafir
- Affiliation: Hapoel HaMizrachi
- Founded: 1955
- Founder: Maghrebi Jewish immigrants and refugees
- Population (2024): 476

No'am (Hebrew: נֹעַם, נועם, lit. 'Pleasantness') is a religious moshav in south-central Israel. Located in Hevel Lakhish, it falls under the jurisdiction of Shafir Regional Council. In 2024 it had a population of 476.

== History ==
The village was established in 1955 by Hapoel HaMizrachi. The first residents were Jewish immigrants from the Maghreb, most of whom were from Morocco. They were later joined by more Jewish immigrants from Iran and Iraq. It was named after the Biblical book Proverbs 3:17: The Wisdom - "Her ways are ways of pleasantness".
