= Eitan, Israel =

Moshav in southern Israel

Eitan: אֵיתָן (Hebrew)
- Etymology: Enduring
- Location within Ashkelon region of Israel Location within Israel
- Coordinates: 31°34′19″N 34°44′54″E
- Country: Israel
- District: Southern
- Subdistrict: Ashkelon
- Council: Shafir
- Affiliation: Hapoel HaMizrachi
- Founded: 1955
- Founder: Tunisian Jews
- Population (2024): 936

Eitan (Hebrew: אֵיתָן, lit. 'Enduring') is a national-religious moshav in south-central Israel. Located in the southern Shephelah, it falls under the jurisdiction of Shafir Regional Council. In 2024 it had a population of 936.

== Etymology ==
The name is taken from the biblical verse Numbers 24:21; "...Enduring is your dwelling place ...".

== History ==
The village was established in 1955 by Jewish immigrants from Tunisia.

The settlement is an agricultural cooperative, their main crops are citrus fruits, various fruits and vegetables.
