= Shalva =

Shalva: שלווה (Hebrew); شلفا (Arabic)
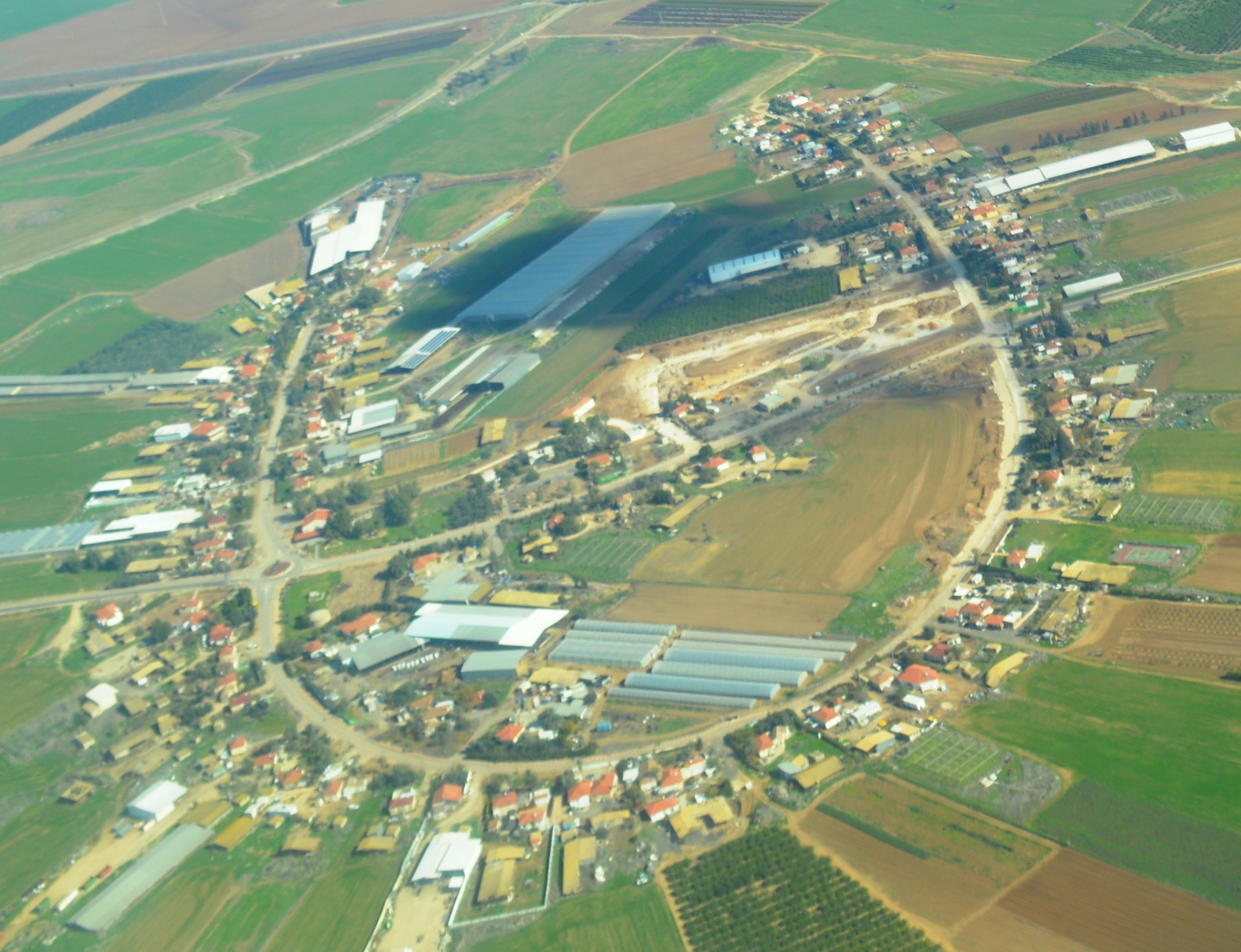

- Location within Ashkelon region of Israel
- Coordinates: 31°33′49″N 34°46′5″E
- Country: Israel
- District: Southern
- Subdistrict: Ashkelon
- Council: Shafir
- Affiliation: Moshavim Movement
- Founded: 1952
- Founder: Libyan Jewish immigrants and refugees
- Population (2024): 677

Shalva (Hebrew: שַׁלְוָה, lit. Security) is a moshav shitufi in southern Israel. Located in the southern Shephelah near Kiryat Gat, it falls under the jurisdiction of Shafir Regional Council. In 2024 it had a population of 677.

== History ==
The moshav was founded in 1952 by Jewish immigrants and refugees mostly from Libya, although some immigrants from Tunisia also joined it. Its name is taken from the book of Psalms 122:7: "be ... security within your towers."
