= Komemiyut =

Moshav in southern Israel

Komemiyut: קוממיות (Hebrew)
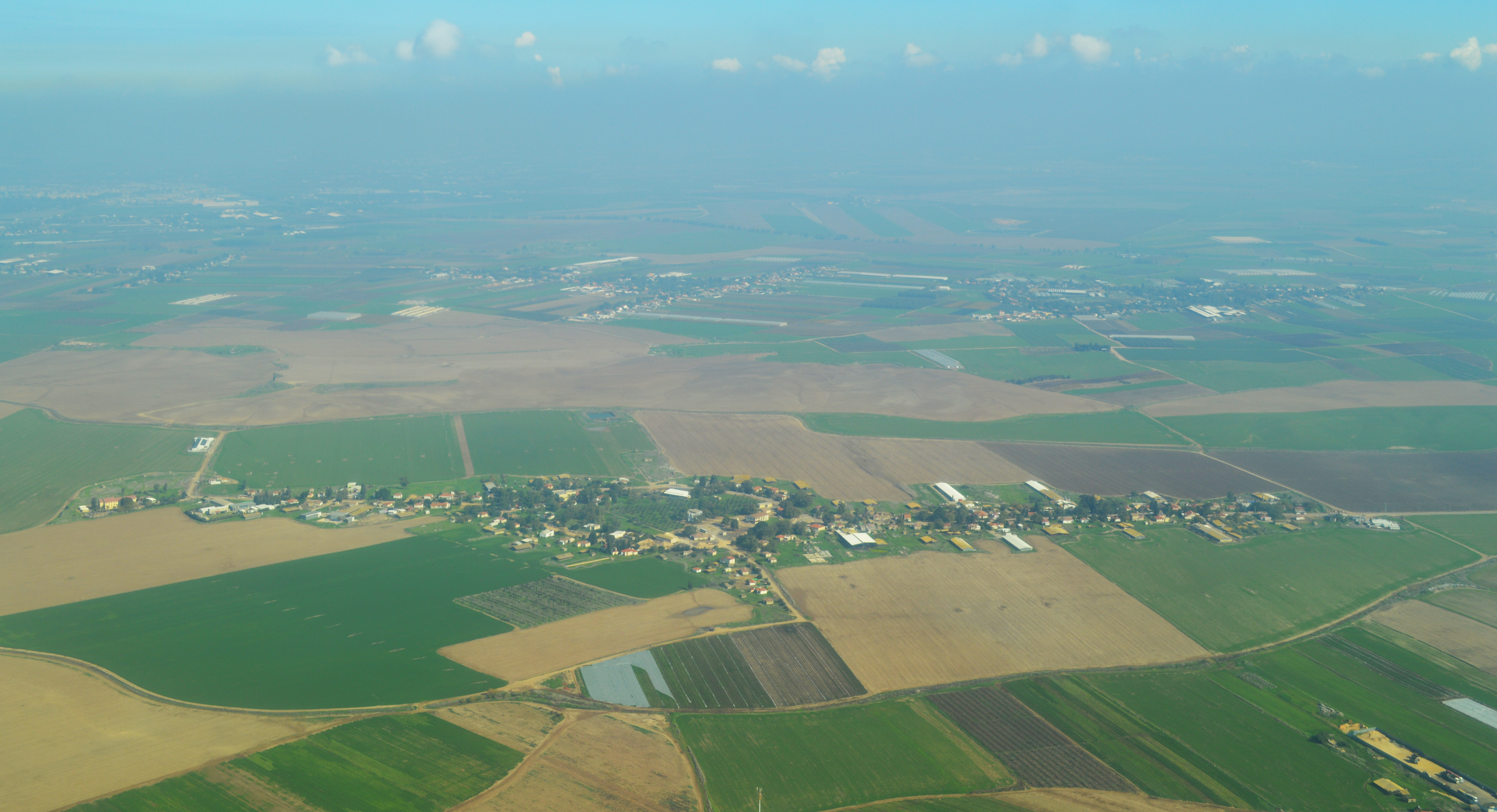
- View of Komemiyut
- Etymology: Sovereignty
- Location within Ashkelon region of Israel Location within Israel
- Coordinates: 31°39′43″N 34°43′50″E
- Country: Israel
- District: Southern
- Subdistrict: Ashkelon
- Council: Shafir
- Founded: 1950
- Founder: Demobilised soldiers
- Population (2024): 486

Komemiyut (Hebrew: קוממיות, lit. 'Sovereignty') is a Hasidic moshav in south-central Israel. Located in the southern Shephelah near the city of Kiryat Gat, it falls under the jurisdiction of Shafir Regional Council. In 2024 it had a population of 486.

== History ==
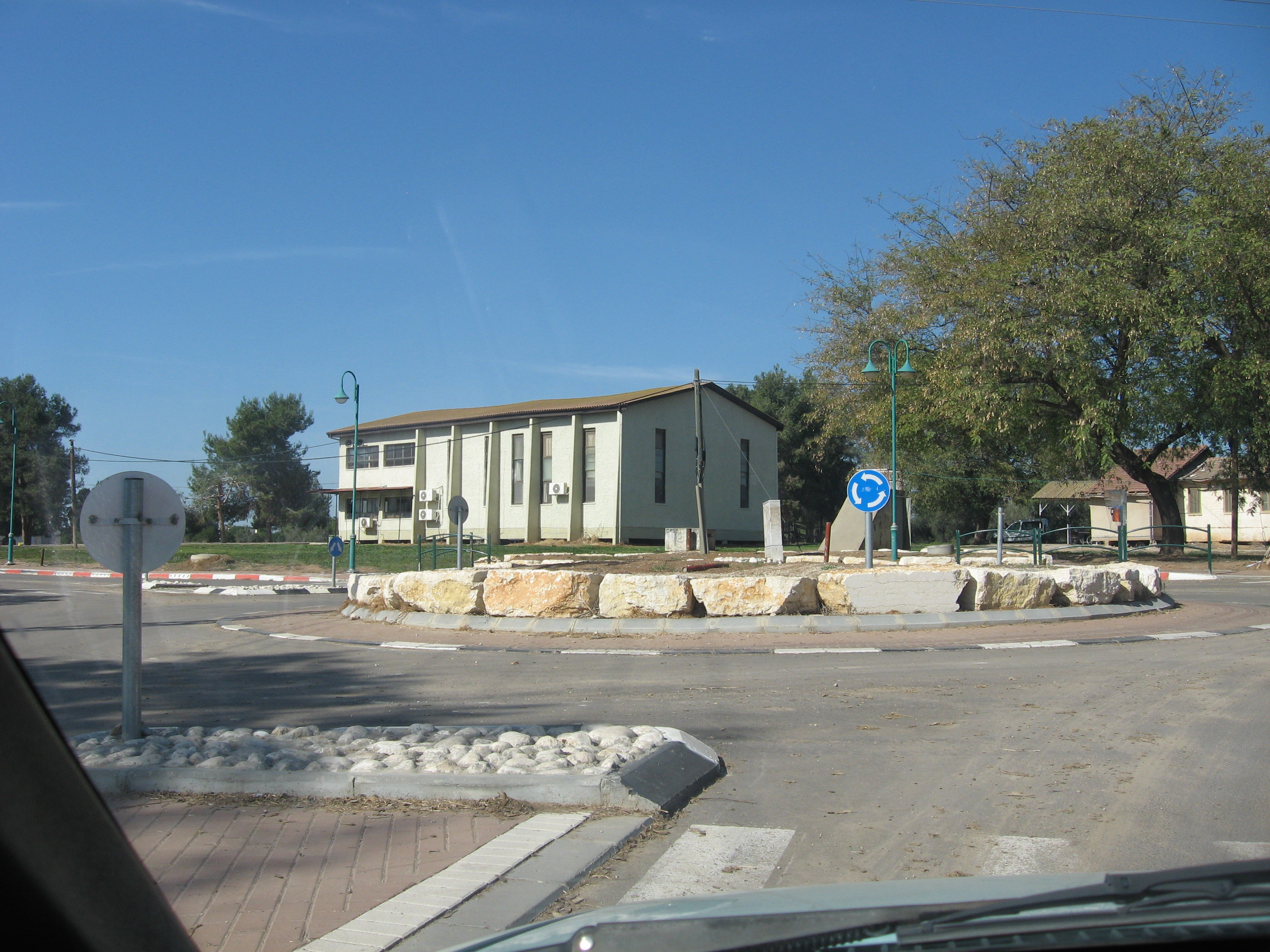
Center of Komemiyut

The group which established the village was formed as a youth group by Agudat Israel in August 1949, composed mainly of demobilized soldiers from a religious unit that had fought in the area during the 1948 Arab–Israeli War. The name is taken from a biblical passage, Leviticus 26:13: "I have broken the bands of your yoke and made you walk upright".

After training in Nahalat Yehuda, the group founded the moshav in 1950 on land given to it by the Jewish National Fund. The village was built on the site of the depopulated Palestinian village of Karatiyya.

The moshav was built as an agricultural village, but to ensure a livelihood during the shmita year, industries were also established. The moshav has two bakeries including a matzo bakery, a dairy, a shingles factory, a marble factory, and a tefillin factory. The moshav also has a program for yeshiva students, during which they study for six days and return to their homes only for shabbat and a Talmud Torah school for children.

== Shmita harvest ==
As it was founded by observant Jews, the village was one of the few that refrained from working the land during the first Shmita year after independence, 1952.
