= Moledet, Israel =

Moledet: מוֹלֶדֶת (Hebrew)
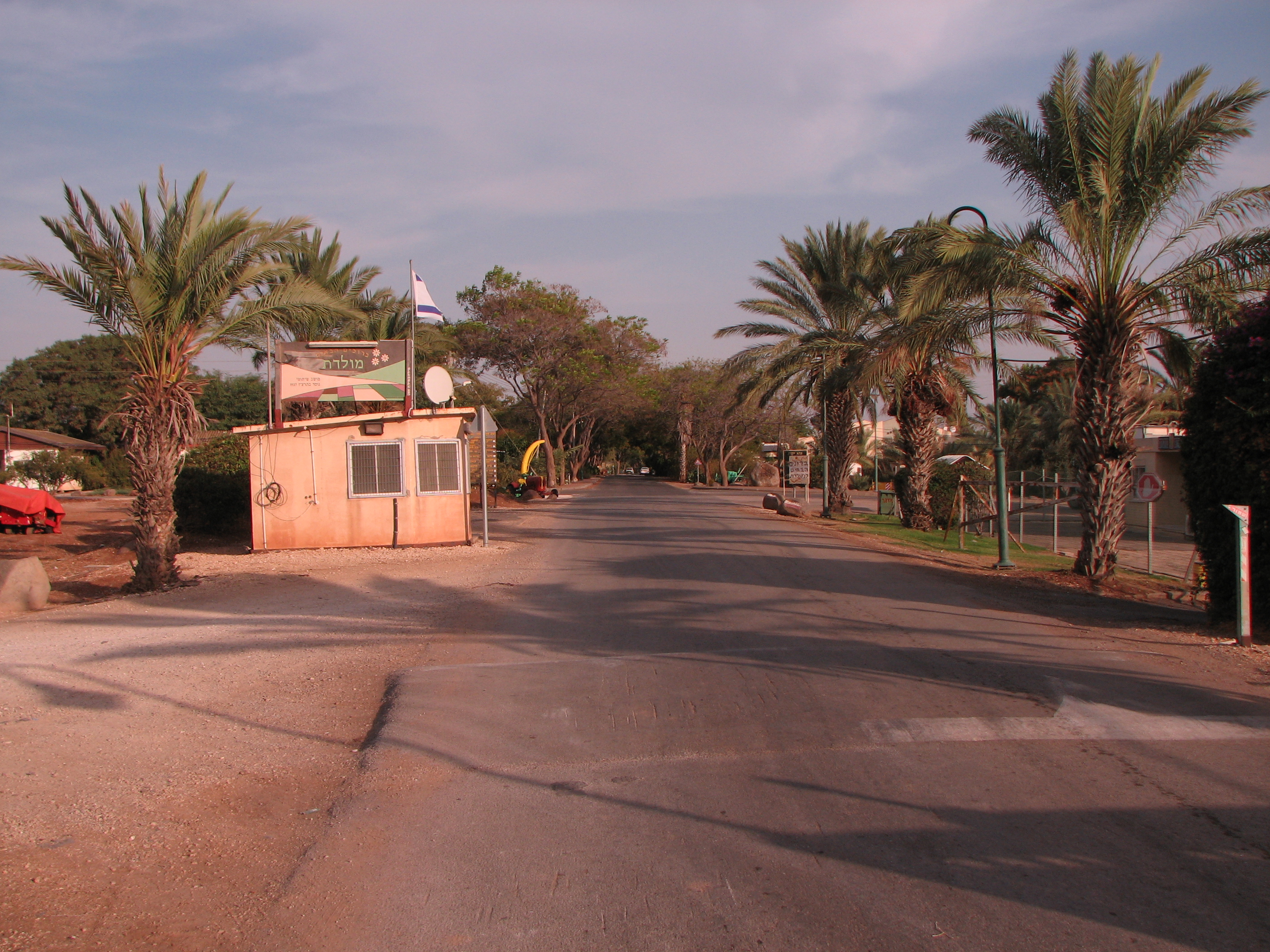

- Location within Jezreel Valley region of Israel
- Coordinates: 32°35′9″N 35°26′32″E
- Country: Israel
- District: Northern
- Subdistrict: Jezreel
- Council: Gilboa
- Affiliation: Moshavim Movement
- Founded: 4 July 1937
- Founder: Moledet organization
- Population (2024): 1,211

Moledet (Hebrew: מוֹלֶדֶת, lit. Homeland) is a moshav shitufi in northern Israel. Located in the Lower Galilee, it falls under the jurisdiction of Gilboa Regional Council. In 2024 it had a population of 1,211.

== History ==
The community was founded as a 'moshav shitufi' (collective settlement - a combination between kibbutz and moshav) on 4 July 1937, as part of the Tower and stockade program, and was named after the "Moledet" organization of the founders, who were immigrants to Mandate Palestine from Germany. In 1944, the community became a moshav shitufi named "Bnei Brit", named after the Bnai Brith organization in the United States, which donated money for purchasing the land, in honor of their president Alfred Cohen. The place then changed its name to "Moledet-Bnei Brit" until in 1957, when it finally reverted to just "Moledet."

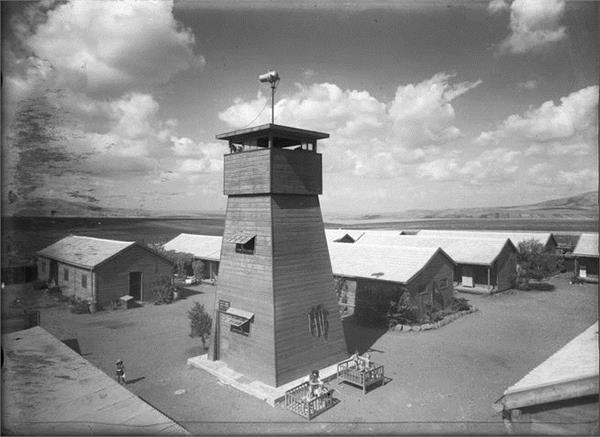
Bnei Brit 1941

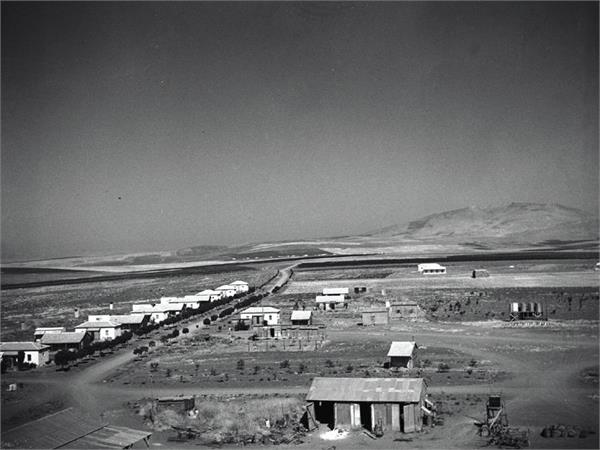
Bnei Brit 1945

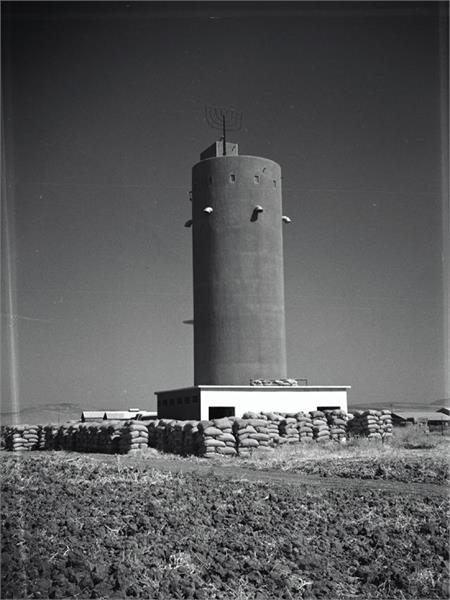
Bnei Brit "silo" 1945

Children of Moledet in 1950
