= Uza, Israel =

Uza: עוזה (Hebrew)
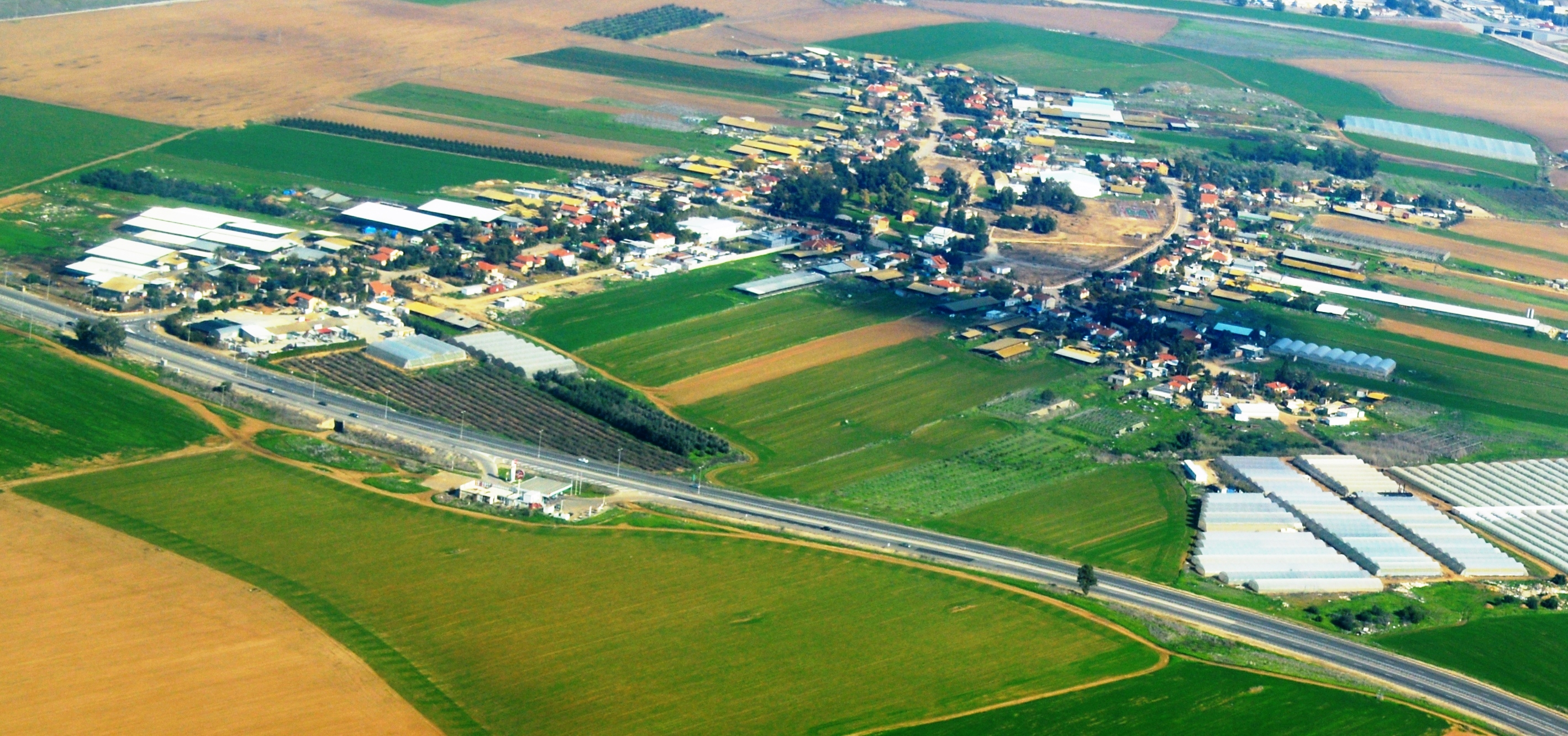

- Location within Ashkelon region of Israel
- Coordinates: 31°35′41″N 34°45′52″E
- Country: Israel
- District: Southern
- Subdistrict: Ashkelon
- Council: Shafir
- Affiliation: Hapoel HaMizrachi
- Founded: 1950
- Population (2024): 457

Uza (Hebrew: עוזה, lit. 'Strength') is a religious moshav in southern Israel. Located in Hevel Lakhish around two kilometres south of Kiryat Gat and covering 1,000 dunams, it falls under the jurisdiction of Shafir Regional Council. In 2024 it had a population of 457.

== History ==
The village was established in 1950 by Libyan Jews. Its name was taken from the biblical passage "Summon the might, O God, show the strength, O God, thou who hast wrought for us" (Psalms 68:28)."
