= Shafir Regional Council =

Coordinates: 31.683°N 34.717°E

Shafir מועצה אזורית שפיר مجلس إقليمي شفير
- Regional council (from 1950)
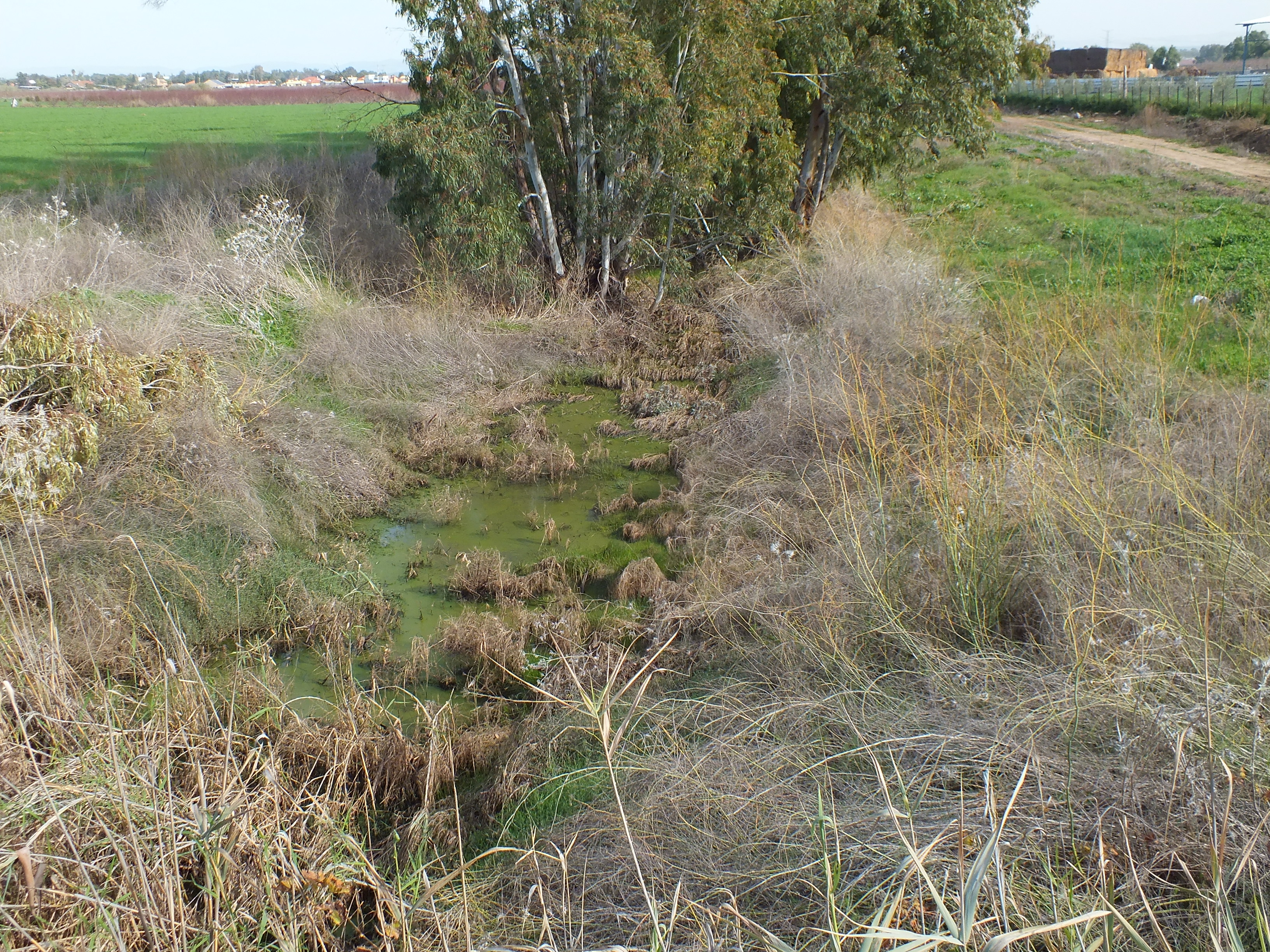
- Guvrin Stream, sketching the border between the regional municipalities of Shafir and Be'er Tuvia.

- Interactive map of Shafir
- Country: Israel
- District: Southern
- Subdistrict: Ashkelon
- Natural region: Lakhish, Malakhi

Government
  - Head of Municipality: Adir Neeman

Area
  - Total: 81,860 dunams (81.86 km^{2}; 31.61 sq mi)

Population (2024)
  - Total: 14,842
  - Density: 181.3/km^{2} (469.6/sq mi)
- Website: Official website

Shafir Regional Council (Hebrew: מועצה אזורית שפיר, Mo'atza Azorit Shafir) is a regional council in the Southern District of Israel near the city of Kiryat Gat.

The council is bordered on the north by the Be'er Tuvia Regional Council, on the east by Yoav Regional Council and Kiryat Gat, on the south by Lakhish Regional Council, and on the west by Hof Ashkelon Regional Council, Yoav Regional Council.

The council is named for the Biblical city of Shafir.

== List of settlements ==
=== Kibbutz ===
- Ein Tzurim

=== Moshavim ===
- Eitan
- Komemiyut
- Masu'ot Yitzhak
- No'am
- Revaha
- Shalva
- Shafir
- Uza
- Zavdiel
- Zrahia

=== Villages ===
- Aluma
- Even Shmuel
- Merkaz Shapira

== Demographics ==
Historical population
Year	Pop.	±%
1972	5,600	—
1983	6,600	+17.9%
1995	6,000	−9.1%
2008	9,200	+53.3%
2022	13,381	+45.4%
2024	14,842	+10.9%

== Voting Patterns ==
In the 2022 election, 91 percent of voters in the regional council voted for the parties of the right-wing coalition led by Benjamin Netanyahu, while 9 percent voted for the parties of the center-left coalition led by Yair Lapid and 0.03 percent voted for the Arab parties.

In the 2026 election, 83 percent of voters in the regional council voted for the parties of the right-wing coalition led by Benjamin Netanyahu, while 10 percent voted for the parties of the center-left coalition led by Gadi Eisenkot and 0.01 percent voted for the Arab parties. An additional 2 percent voted for the Reservists, and 4.4 percent voted for Amcha Yisrael. Voter turnout increased 15 percent from the 2022 election.
