= Moshav shitufi =

Type of cooperative Israeli village

A moshav shitufi (Hebrew: מושב שיתופי, lit. collective moshav, pl. moshavim shitufiim) is a type of cooperative Israeli village, whose organizational principles place it between the kibbutz and the moshav on the scale of cooperation.

== Ideology ==
A classic moshav (formally known as moshav ovdim, or workers' moshav) is a village-level service cooperative that takes care of farm services (such as marketing, supply, and credit) for its members, while all production and consumption activities are handled at the level of families and households. A classical kibbutz is a village-level production cooperative, with all production, consumption, and service decisions handled collectively. Moshav shitufi is an intermediate form, in which production and services are handled collectively, while consumption decisions remain the responsibility of the households. Moshav shitufi members are engaged in agriculture and industry in the village and also work in various professions outside the community, contributing their salary to the collective.

== History ==
The first moshav shitufi, Kfar Hittim in Lower Galilee, was established in 1936. Moshav shitufi has never been as widespread as moshav or kibbutz. Thus, at the end of 2006 there were 40 such cooperative villages in Israel, compared with 400 moshavim and nearly 300 kibbutzim. The population in moshavim shitufiim was around 18,000, compared with 350,000 in moshavim and kibbutzim combined. There have been numerous instances in the history of cooperative agriculture in Israel when a kibbutz or a moshav reorganized as moshav shitufi, and vice versa. Thus, Moledet, the second moshav shitufi created in Israel, was founded in 1937 as a kibbutz and then reorganized in 1944 as moshav shitufi Bnei Brit (named after the Bnai Brith organization in the United States), reverting to the original name Moledet in 1957.

== See also ==
- List of moshavim shitufiim
