= Beit Zayit =

Beit Zayit: בית זית (Hebrew)
- Moshav
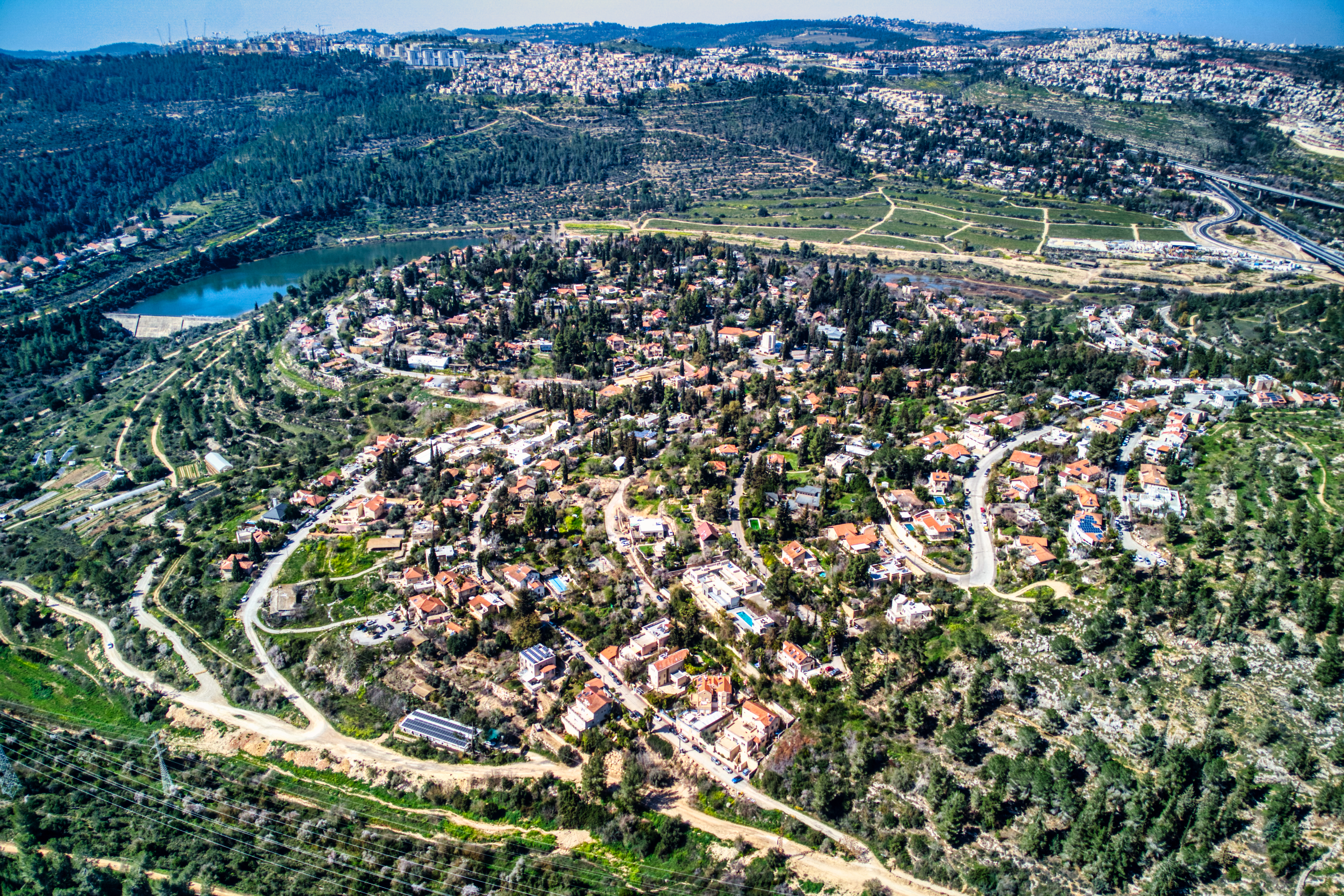
- Etymology: House of Olives
- Location within Jerusalem District Location within Israel
- Coordinates: 31°46′58″N 35°9′34″E
- Country: Israel
- District: Jerusalem
- Council: Mateh Yehuda
- Affiliation: Moshavim Movement
- Founded: 1949
- Founder: Egyptian, Romanian and Yugoslav Jews
- Population (2024): 1,540
- Website: www.beit-zait.org

Beit Zayit (Hebrew: בית זית, lit. 'House of Olives') is a moshav in central Israel. Located just outside the Jerusalem municipal border to the west, it falls under the jurisdiction of Mateh Yehuda Regional Council. In 2024 it had a population of 1,540. Beit Zayit lies in the Judaean Mountains on the edge of the Jerusalem Forest, the artificial municipal pine forest planted in by the Jewish National Fund on the outskirts of West Jerusalem.

== History ==
Beit Zayit was established in 1949, after the 1948 Arab-Israeli War, on land that had formerly belonged to the depopulated Palestinian village of 'Ayn Karim. It was established in 1949 by Jewish immigrants from Egypt, Romania and Yugoslavia. The economy was based on fruit orchards, vegetables, poultry, and other farm products.

With the expansion of the moshav in the late 1990s, including the purchase of land by newcomers and renovation of old homes, Beit Zayit became a trendy alternative to living in Jerusalem.

== Landmarks ==
=== Beit Zayit Reservoir ===
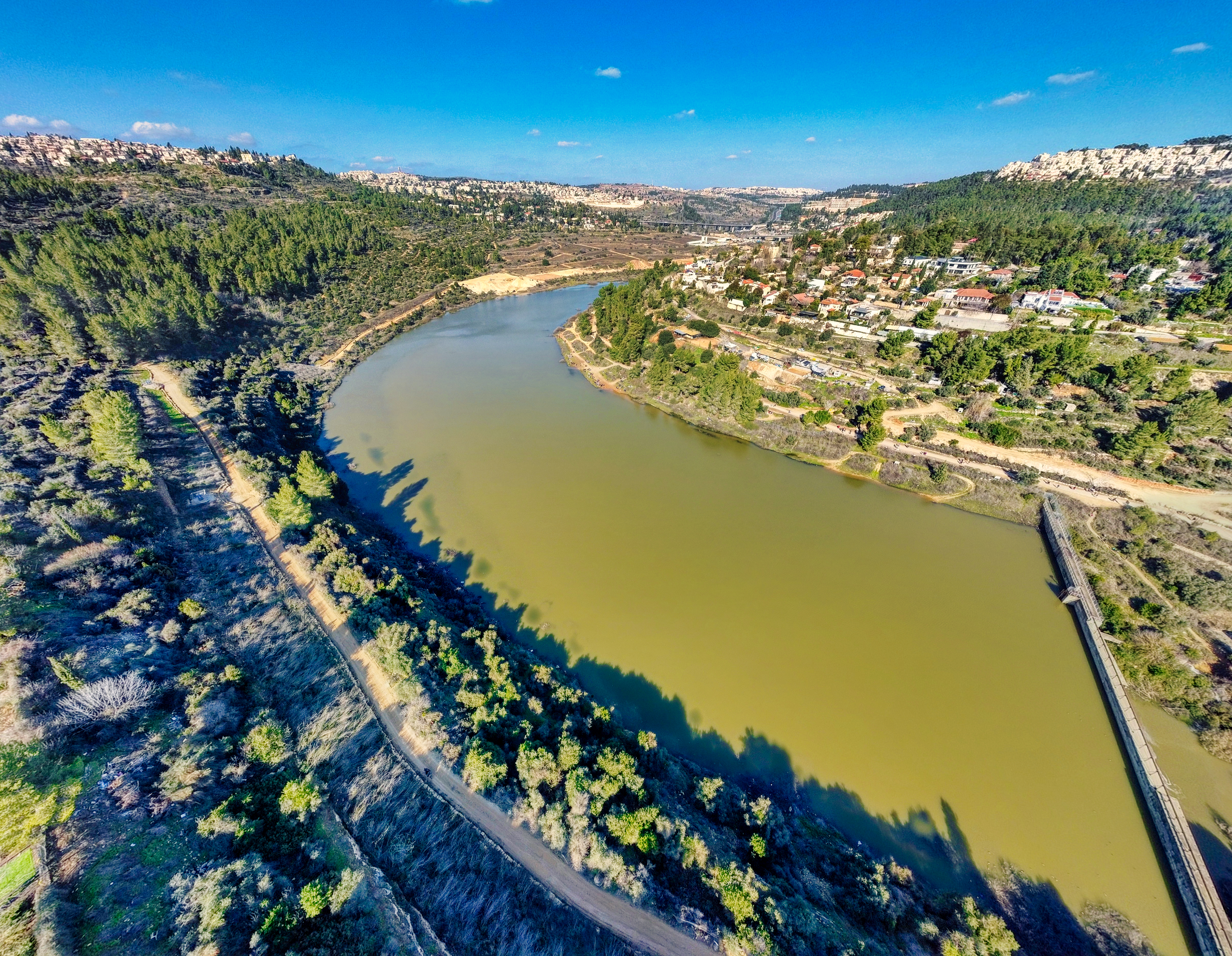
Beit Zayit reservoir

Nearby is a dam, built to collect winter flood waters and create the Beit Zayit Reservoir, meant to slow down the flow of the Nahal Sorek and allow water to seep into the Western Mountain Aquifer, a task it seems has not been doing properly, due to insufficient geotechnical and hydrological studies in preparation to the project. It's possible to take the Loop Trail to the Reservoir.

=== Dinosaur footprints ===
In 1962, dinosaur footprints were discovered in the garden of one of Beit Zayit's residents, and are on display at the Hebrew University of Jerusalem. This is the only place in Israel where evidence of dinosaurs was discovered, and one of few such sites in the Middle East.

== Archaeology ==
Multiple salvage excavations have been conducted in the village over the years. These excavations revealed remains from several periods, including a farmhouse from the late Iron Age, associated with a local flint industry, that remained active until the Hellenistic period. It is possibly linked to the nearby ancient settlement of Tel Motza. Additionally, structures from the Hasmonean era were uncovered, along with numerous buildings from the Roman and Byzantine periods, including a Roman-era workshop and a monumental building from the Byzantine period.

== In popular culture ==
In the Israeli TV show Fauda, the village is visited by the main characters since one of the characters, Yaara, lives there.
