= Moshav =

Type of cooperative Jewish agricultural community

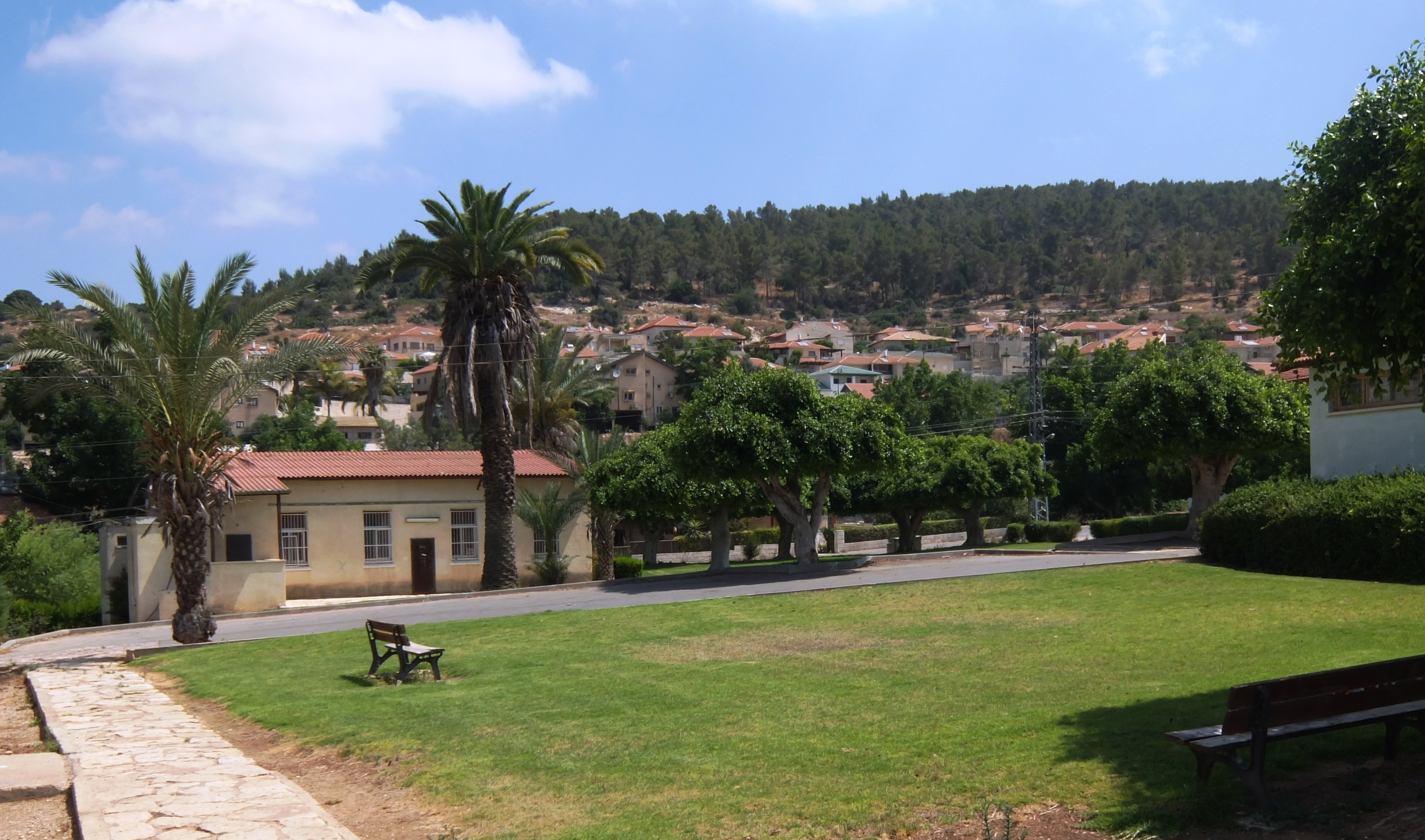
Moshav Zekharia

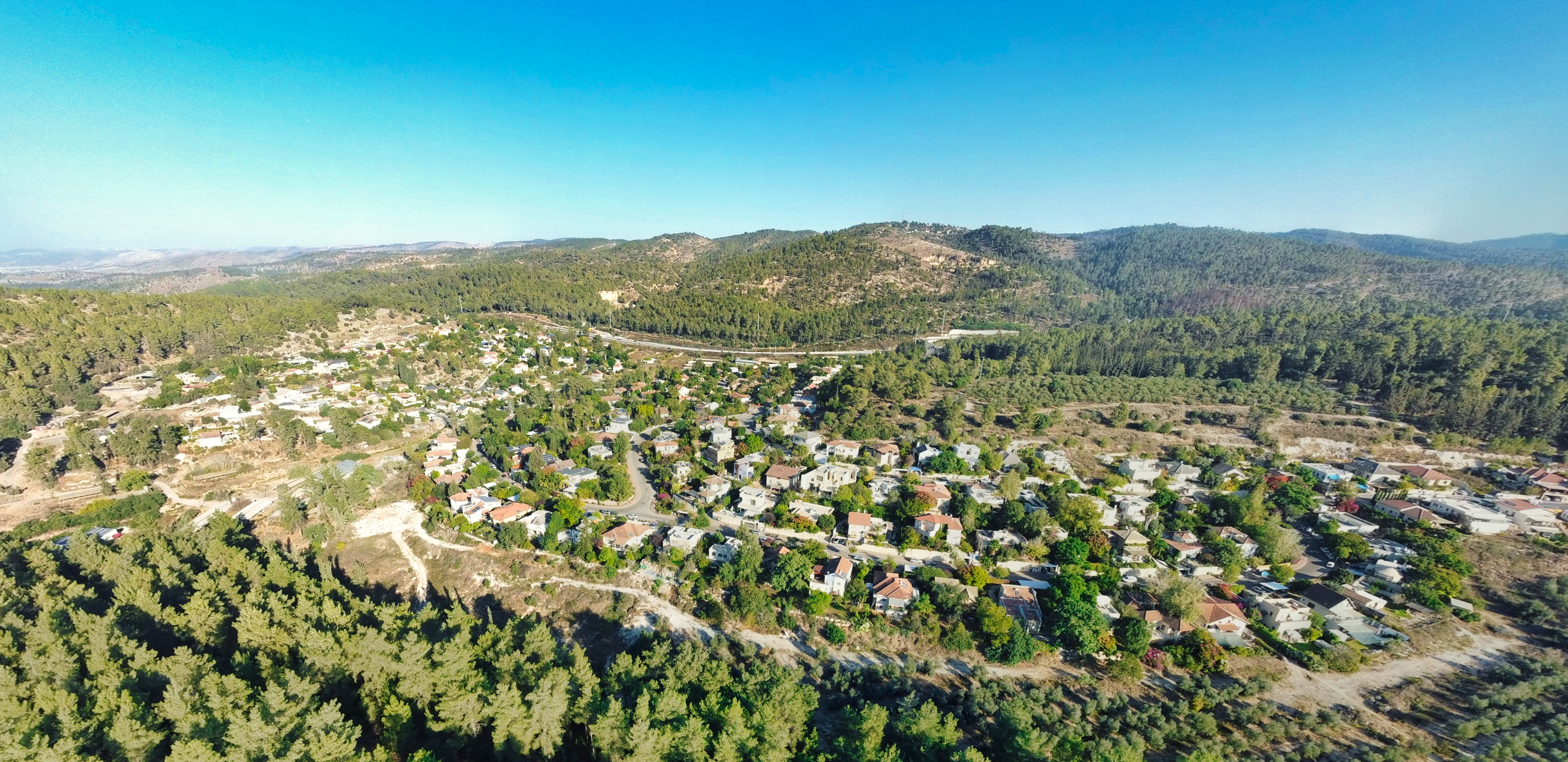
Mesilat Zion

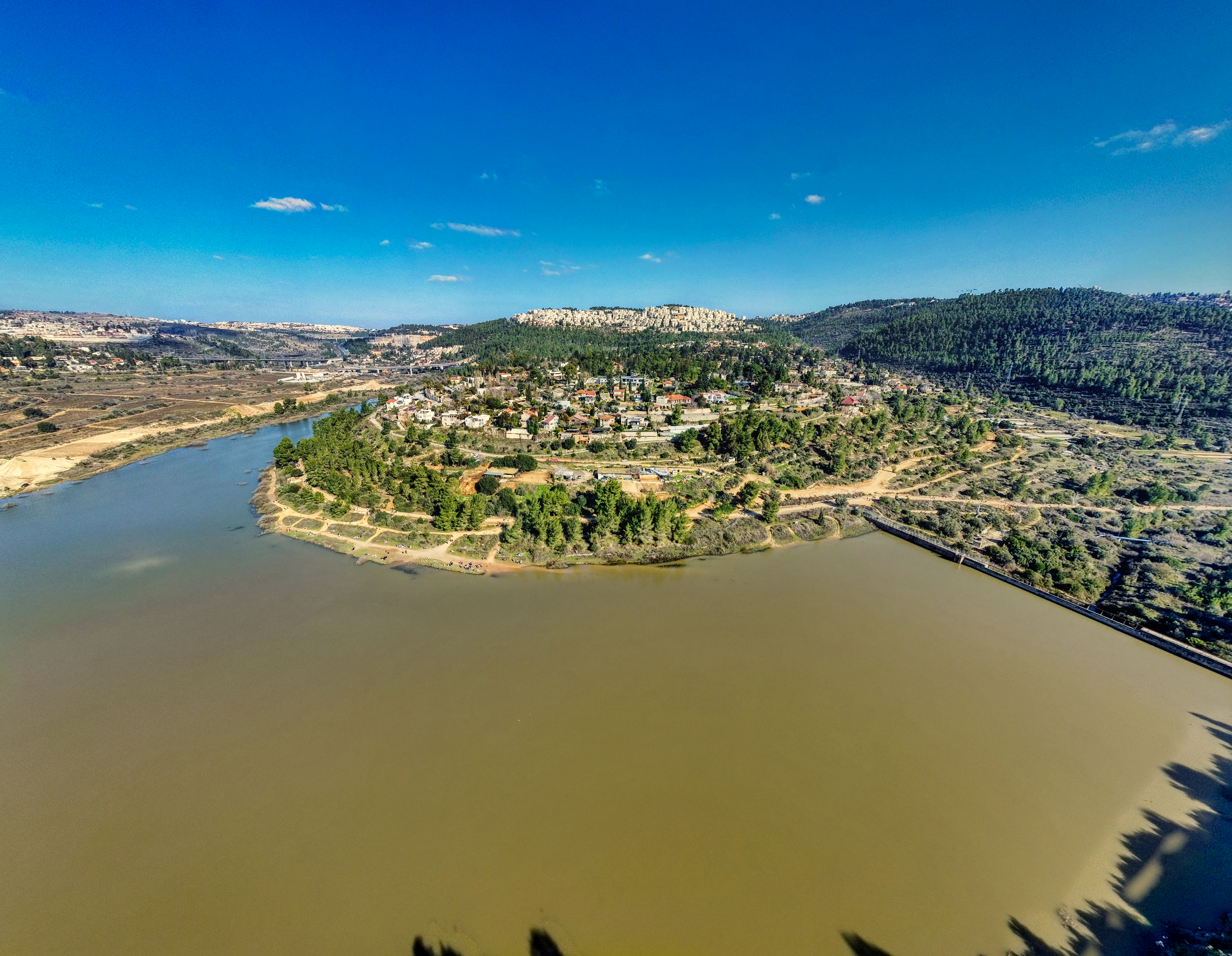
Beit Zayit

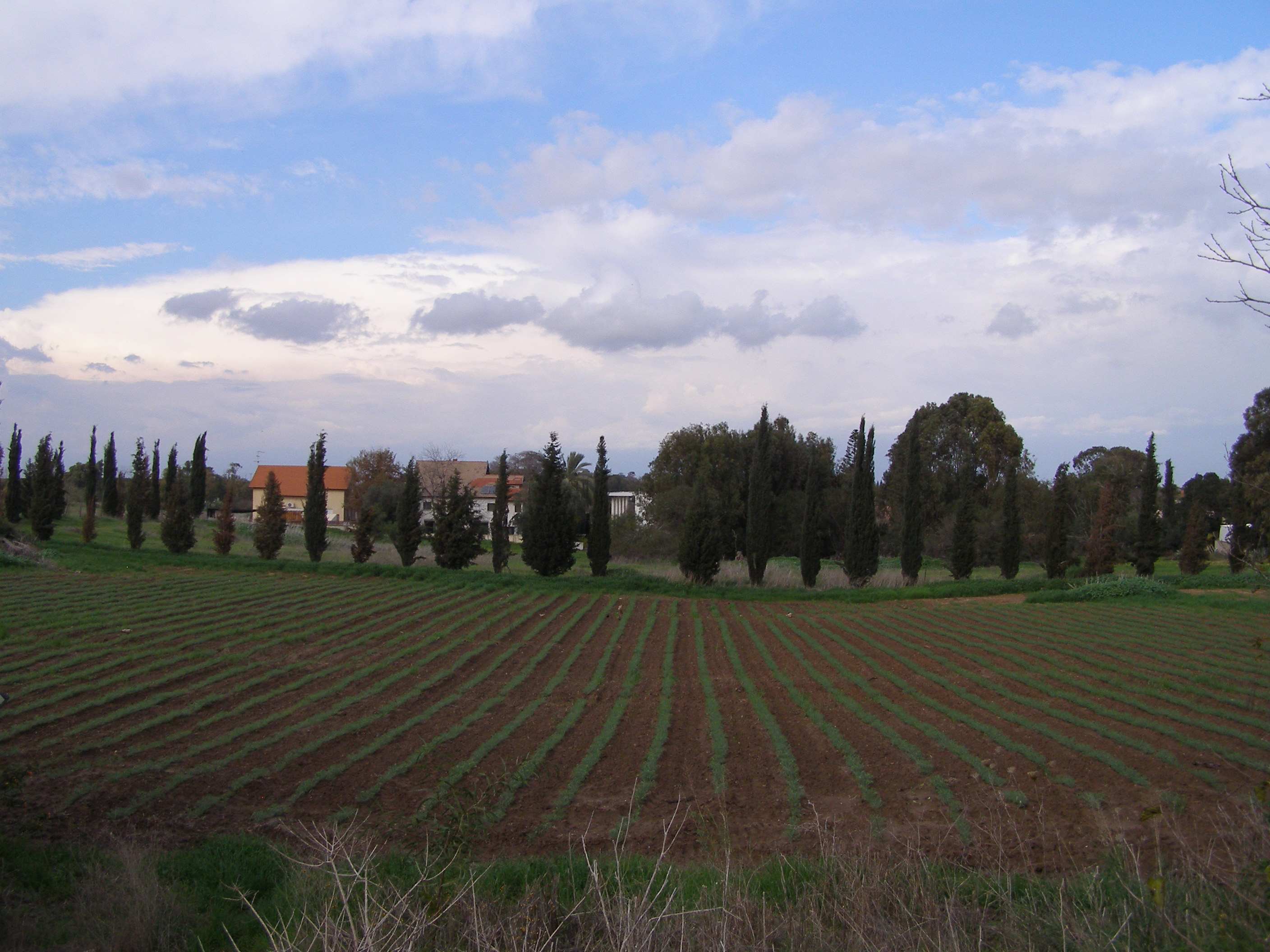
Shdema

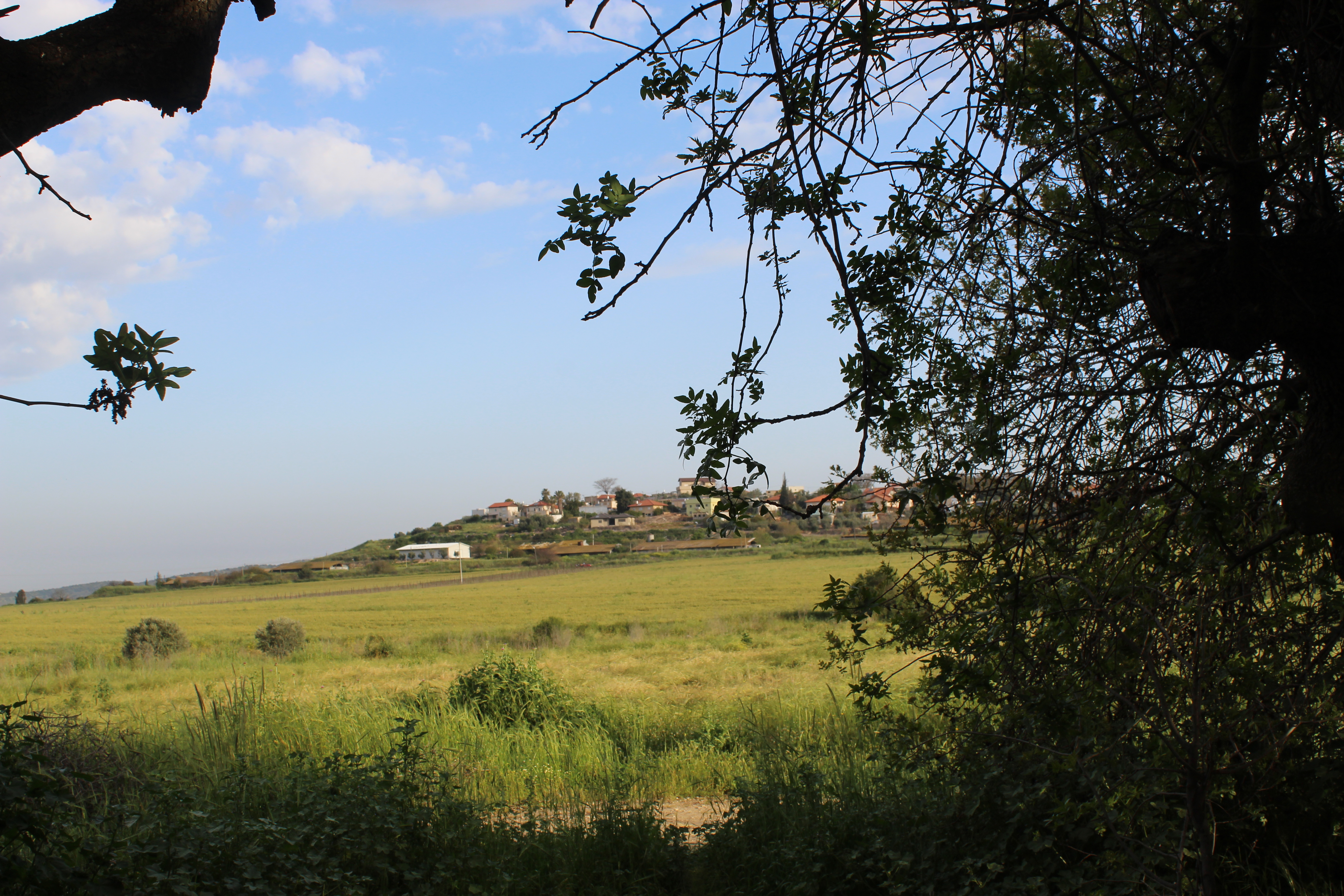
Moshav Neve Michael

A moshav (Hebrew: מוֹשָׁב; pl. מוֹשָׁבִים, moshavim, 'settlements' or 'villages') is a type of Israeli Jewish group cooperative agricultural community of individual farms pioneered by Labour Zionists. A resident or a member of a moshav can be called a "moshavnik" (מוֹשַׁבְנִיק). There is an umbrella organization, the Moshavim Movement.

The moshavim are similar to kibbutzim with an emphasis on communitarian, individualist labour. They were designed as part of the Zionist state-building programme following the green revolution Yishuv (Hebrew for 'settlement') in the British Mandate of Palestine during the early 20th century, but in contrast to the collective farming kibbutzim, farms in a moshav tended to be individually owned but of fixed and equal size. Workers produced crops and other goods on their properties through individual or pooled labour with the profit and foodstuffs going to provide for themselves. Moshavim are governed by an elected council (Hebrew: ועד, romanized: va'ad, lit. 'committee'). Community projects and facilities were financed by a special tax (Hebrew: מס ועד, romanized: mas va'ad, lit. 'committee tax'). This tax was equal for all households of the community.

== Types ==
There are several organisational variants, of which the most common are:

- Moshav ovdim (Hebrew: מושב עובדים, lit. 'workers' moshav'), a workers' cooperative settlement. The more numerous (405) type, it relies on cooperative purchasing of supplies and marketing of produce; the family or household is, however, the basic unit of production and consumption.
- Moshav shitufi (Hebrew: מושב שיתופי, lit. 'collective moshav'), a collective smallholders' settlement that combines the economic features of a kibbutz with the social features of a moshav. Farming is done collectively and profits are shared equally. This form is closer to the collectivity of the kibbutz: although consumption is family or household based, production and marketing are collective. In contrast to the moshav ovdim system, land is not allotted to households or individuals, but is worked collectively.
- Moshbutz, a mixed moshav-kibbutz type of settlement.

== History ==
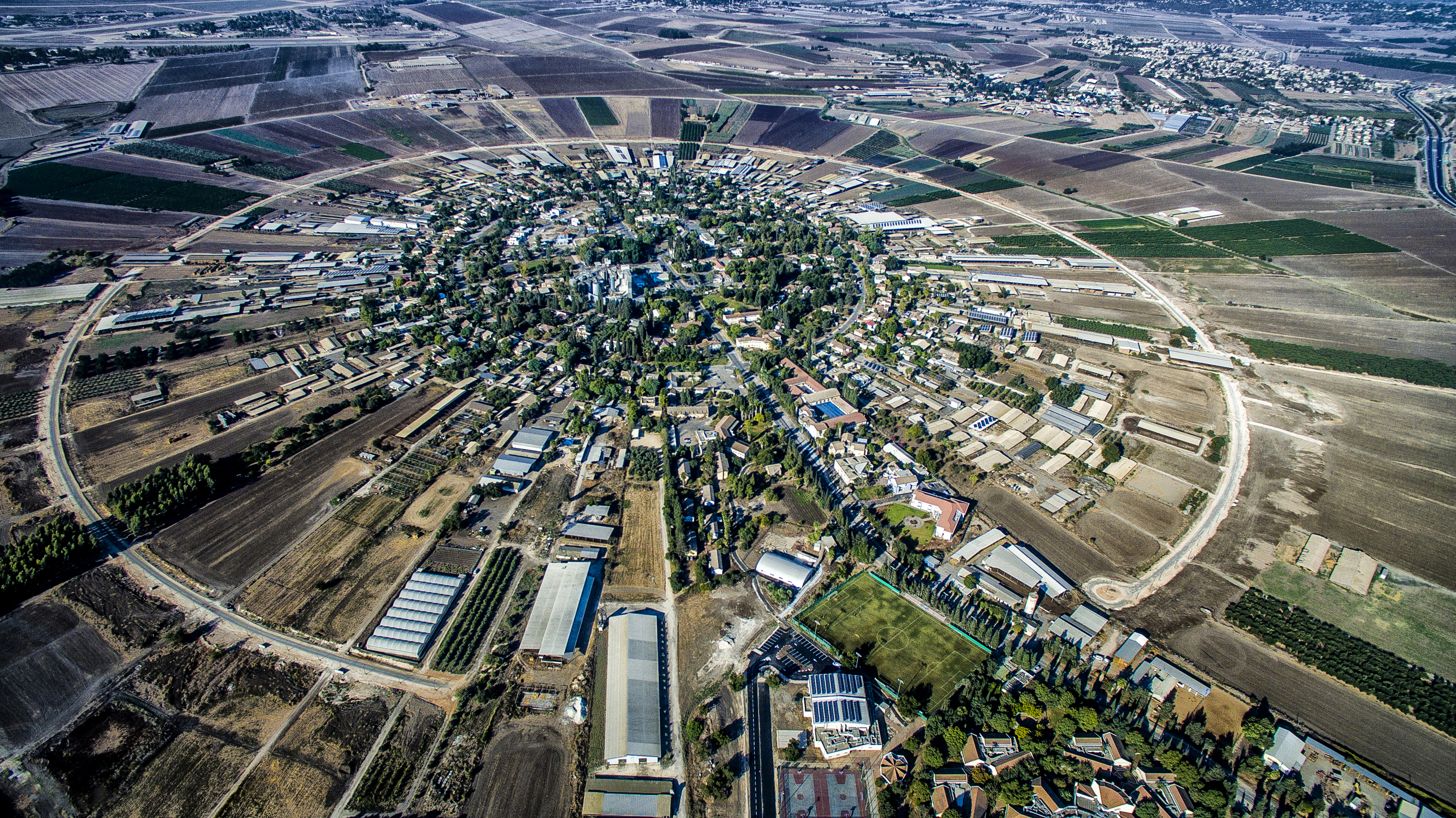
Moshav Nahalal in Jezreel Valley

The first moshav, Nahalal, was established in the Jezreel Valley (also known as the Valley of Esdraelon) on September 11, 1921. By 1986 about 156,700 Israelis lived and worked on 448 moshavim; the great majority of these are divided among eight federations.

Because the moshav organisation retained the family as the centre of social life, it was much more attractive to traditional Mizrahi immigrants in the 1950s and early 1960s. They eschewed bold experiments, like communal child-rearing or equality of the sexes, practiced by communal kibbutzim. These so-called "immigrants' moshavim" (Hebrew: מושב עולים, romanized: moshav olim) were one of the most-used and successful forms of absorption and integration of Mizrahi Jewish immigrants; it allowed them a much steadier ascent into the middle class than did life in some development towns.

Since the Six-Day War in 1967, both moshavim and kibbutzim have relied increasingly on outside—including Palestinian—labour. Financial instabilities in the early 1980s hit many moshavim hard, as did their high birth rate and the problem of absorbing all the children who might wish to remain in the community. By the late 1980s, moshav members increasingly came to be employed in non-agricultural sectors outside the community, so that some moshavim began to resemble suburbs or commuter towns whose residents commute to work. In general, moshavim never enjoyed the "political elite" status afforded to kibbutzim during the period of Israeli Labor Party dominance; correspondingly the moshavim did not endure the decline in prestige experienced by kibbutzim in the 1970s and 1980s, during the period of Likud dominance starting in 1977.

== See also ==
- List of moshavim
- Settlement movement (Israel)
