= Highway 35 (Israel) =

Road in Israel

Coordinates: 31°35′14″N 34°50′14″E

Highway 35
- כביש 35

Route information
- Length: 58 km (36 mi)

Major junctions
- West end: Ashkelon (Berekhya Junction)
- Givati Junction; Negba Interchange; Plugot Junction; Guvrin Junction; Tarqumiyah Terminal
- East end: Hebron (HaOkfim Junction)

Location
- Country: Israel
- Major cities: Ashkelon, Kiryat Gat, Beit Guvrin, Tarqumiyah, Idhna, Halhul, Hebron

Highway system
- Roads in Israel; Highways
← Highway 34	→ Highway 38

Highway 35 is a highway in south-central Israel. It runs roughly from west to east. It begins in Ashkelon, passes through the Lakhish region and Kiryat Gat, crosses the Green Line and terminates at a junction with Highway 60 between Hebron and Halhul. Highway 35 is 58 km long. The road follows the "Lachish Road", an ancient east–west trade route connecting the Via Maris and the Way of the Patriarchs.

== Junctions and interchanges on the highway ==
Km	Location	Name	Type	Meaning	Intersecting routes
Highway 35
0	Ashkelon	צומת ברכיה (Berekhya Junction)			Highway 4
1.9	Berekhya, Mash'en	(Junction with Route 3500)			Road 3500
3.4	Ganei HaTzvi Events Center				entrance road
4.9	filling station	(westbound only)			entrance road
5.85	Sde Yoav	צומת גבעתי (Givati Junction)			Route 232 North
6	Sde Yoav	צומת גבעתי (Givati Junction)			Route 232 South
7.7	Sde Yoav, Negba, Yoav Fort	מחלף נגבה (Negba Interchange)			entrance road
8.6	Hamei Yoav (Yoav Spa)				entrance road
9.6	Otzem	צומת נהורה (Nehora Junction)			Route 352
10.3	Yad Natan	צומת ליד נתן (Yad Natan Junction)			HaMiyasdim St
13	Revaha	צומת רווחה (Revaha Junction)			Road 3533
15.2	Camp Plugot				entrance road
15.4	Netiv HaLamed Hei Reservoir	(eastbound only)			entrance road
16.5	Kiryat Gat	צומת פלוגות (Plugot Junction)			Highway 40
17.8	Kiryat Gat	מחלף קרית גת צפון (Kiryat Gat North Interchange)			Lakhish Boulevard
17.9	HaZera Genetics Mivhor Seed Farm	Eliminated 2016			entrance road
19	Kiryat Gat	מחלף קריית גת מזרח (Qiryat Gat South Interchange)		(westbound only)	Road 3444; HaDarom Road
19.2	Kiryat Gat	מחלף קריית גת מזרח (Qiryat Gat South Interchange)		(eastbound only)	Road 3444; HaDarom Road
20.1	Kiryat Gat Industrial Zone				Israel Polack Blvd.
21	Kiryat Gat Industrial Zone	(eastbound only)			local road
22.1	Sde Moshe	צומת כניסה לשדה משה (Sde Moshe Junction)			Kerem St
22.9	Kiryat Gat	מחלף קריית גת (Qiryat Gat Interchange)			Highway 6
24.4	Melakhim Forest (Shaharriya Park)	צומת שחריה (Shaharriya Junction)			entrance road
25.5	Lakhish Reservoir				entrance road
26.1	Lakhish, Tel Lakhish	צומת לכיש (Lachish Junction)			Road 3415
31.9	Magav Camp (South)				entrance road
32.5	Beit Guvrin rest stop	צומת גוברין (Guvrin Junction)		House of the Powerful	local road to Route 353, Beit Nir
32.6	Beit Guvrin National Park				entrance road
32.9	Beit Guvrin	צומת כניסה לבית גוברין (Beit Guvrin Entrance)			entrance road
33.7	Beit Guvrin	צומת נחושה (Nehusha Junction)		Steadfast	Highway 38
36	Kfar Zoharim	צומת כניסה לכפר זוהרים			entrance road
38					entrance road
38.3	Nehusha, Green Line	צומת כביש 358 (Route 358 Junction, planned as of 2007)			Route 358
40.2	Green Line				
41.3	Green Line, Tarqumiya Terminal				entrance to passenger terminal and cargo transfer station
41.5	Tarqumiyah Security Checkpoint				
↑NO westbound through-traffic for green (Palestinian Authority) license plates↑
41.7	Tarqumiyah Terminal				entrance to passenger terminal and cargo transfer station
42.9	Tarqumiyah				Road 3556; NO entry to yellow (Israeli) license plates
44.5	Tarqumiyah	צומת כביש 354			Route 354 North; NO entry to yellow (Israeli) license plates
44.6	Idhna	צומת כביש 354			Route 354 South; NO entry to yellow (Israeli) license plates
48.6	Adora	צומת לאדורה (Adora Junction)		ult. House named after Adurim	entrance road
49.9	Telem	צומת לתלם (Telem Junction)			entrance road
51.2	factory				entrance road
51.8	Camp Telem				entrance road
53.8	Hebron (West), Beit Kahil				Local road NO entry to yellow (Israeli) license plates
56.3	Hebron, Halhul	צומת הזכוכית (HaZchuhit Junction)		Glass	Local road NO entry to yellow (Israeli) license plates
57.9	Hebron, Halhul	צומת העוקפים (HaOkfim Junction)		Bypasses	Highway 60

== See also ==
- List of highways in Israel
