= Yoav =

Yoav (Hebrew: יואב) is a male given name popular among Israeli Jews. Its popularity is attributed to both Joab (Hebrew: יוֹאָב), commander of King David's army in the Hebrew Bible, and Yitzhak Dubno, a 1940s Palmach soldier whose codename was Yoav.

Yoav is also the namesake of two Israeli settlements: Yoav Regional Council (including Sde Yoav, a kibbutz) in the Southern District, named after Yitzhak "Yoav" Dubno; and Givat Yoav, a moshav in the Golan Heights, named after Israeli soldier Yoav Shaham who died during the Samu incident.

Notable people with the name Yoav include:

- Yoav Avni (born 1969), Israeli author
- Yoav Bear (born 1991), Israeli cyclist
- Yoav Benjamini (born 1949), Israeli statistician
- Yoav Ben-Tzur (born 1958), Israeli politician and acting Minister of Health
- Yoav Bruck (born 1972), Israeli swimmer
- Yoav Chelouche (born 1953), Israeli businessman
- Yoav Cohen (born 1999), Israeli windsurfer
- Yoav Dothan (born 1955), Israeli chess player
- Yoav Eliasi (born 1977), Israeli rapper
- Yoav Eshed (born 1989), Israeli guitarist
- Yoav Freund (born 1961), Israeli computer scientist
- Yoav Gallant (born 1958), Israeli politician and Minister of Defense
- Yoav Gath (born 1980), Israeli swimmer
- Yoav Gelber (born 1943), Israeli historian
- Yoav Gerafi (born 1993), Israeli footballer
- Yoav Goren, American-Israeli musician
- Yoav Har-Even, Israeli general
- Yoav Hofmayster (born 2000), Israeli footballer
- Yoav Horesh (born 1975), Israeli photographer
- Yoav Kisch (born 1968), Israeli politician and Minister of Education
- Yoav Kislev (1932-2017), Israeli agricultural economist
- Yoav Kutner (born 1954), Israeli presenter
- Yoav Landau (born 1992), Israeli-American musician
- Yoav Meiri (born 1975), Israeli swimmer
- Yoav Mordechai (born 1964), Israeli general
- Yoav Omer (born 1998), Israeli windsurfer
- Yoav Potash, American-Israeli writer and filmmaker
- Yoav Ra'anan (born 1928), Israeli diver
- Yoav Reuveni (born 1985), Israeli model and actor
- Yoav Sadan (born 1979), Israeli singer-songwriter
- Yoav Saffar (born 1975), Israeli basketball player
- Yoav Segalovitz (born 1959), Israeli politician
- Yoav Shamir (born 1970), Israeli filmmaker
- Yoav Shechtman (born 1980), Israeli physicist
- Yoav Shoham (born 1956), American-Israeli computer scientist
- Yoav Talmi (born 1953), Israeli composer and conductor
- Yoav Yehoshua Weingarten (1845-1923), Polish rabbi
- Yoav Ziv (born 1981), Israeli footballer
