= Tel Beit Shemesh =

Archaeological tell in Jerusalem District, Israel

Coordinates: 31°45′2″N 34°58′30″E

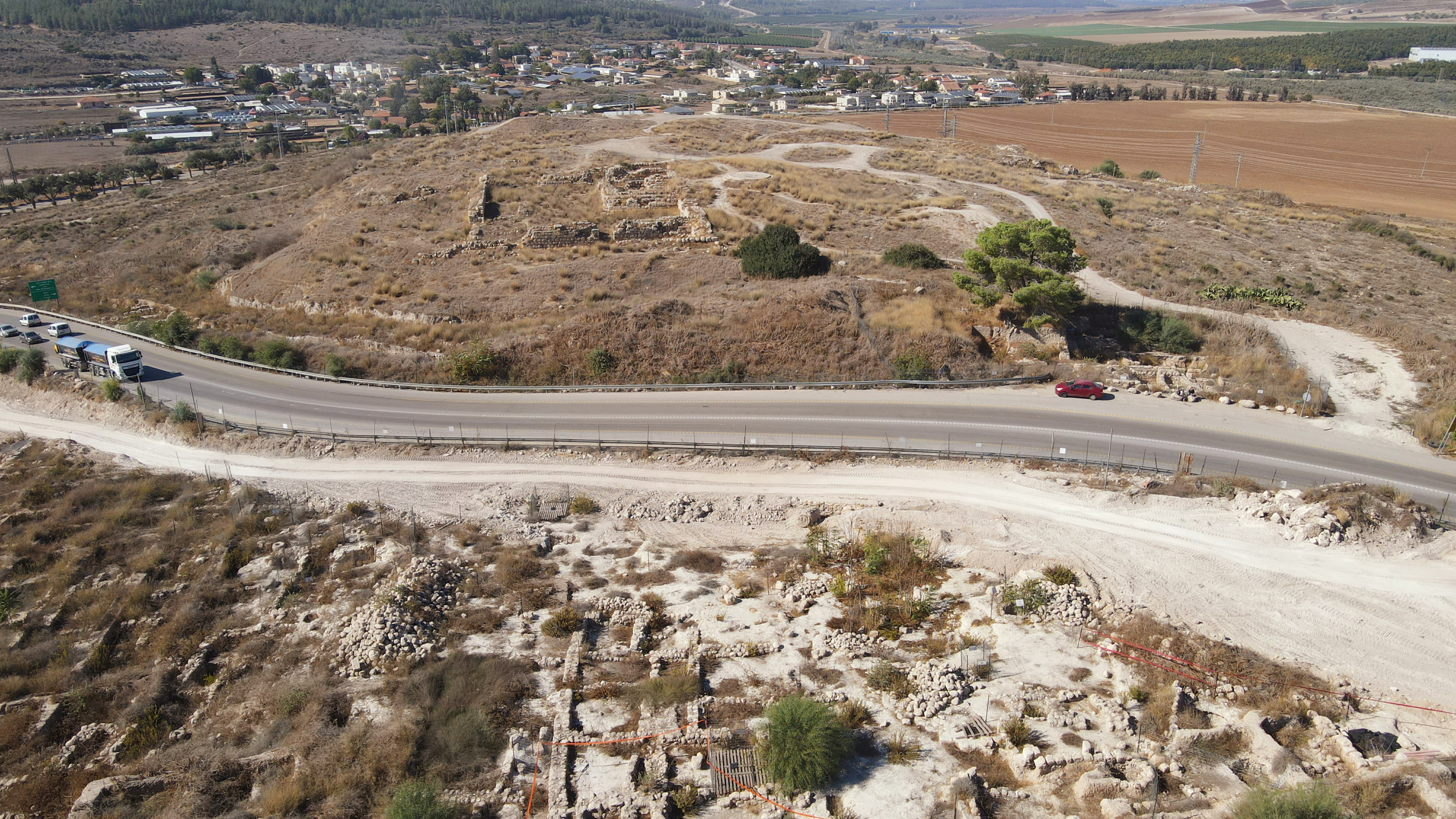
Tel Beit Shemesh from the air

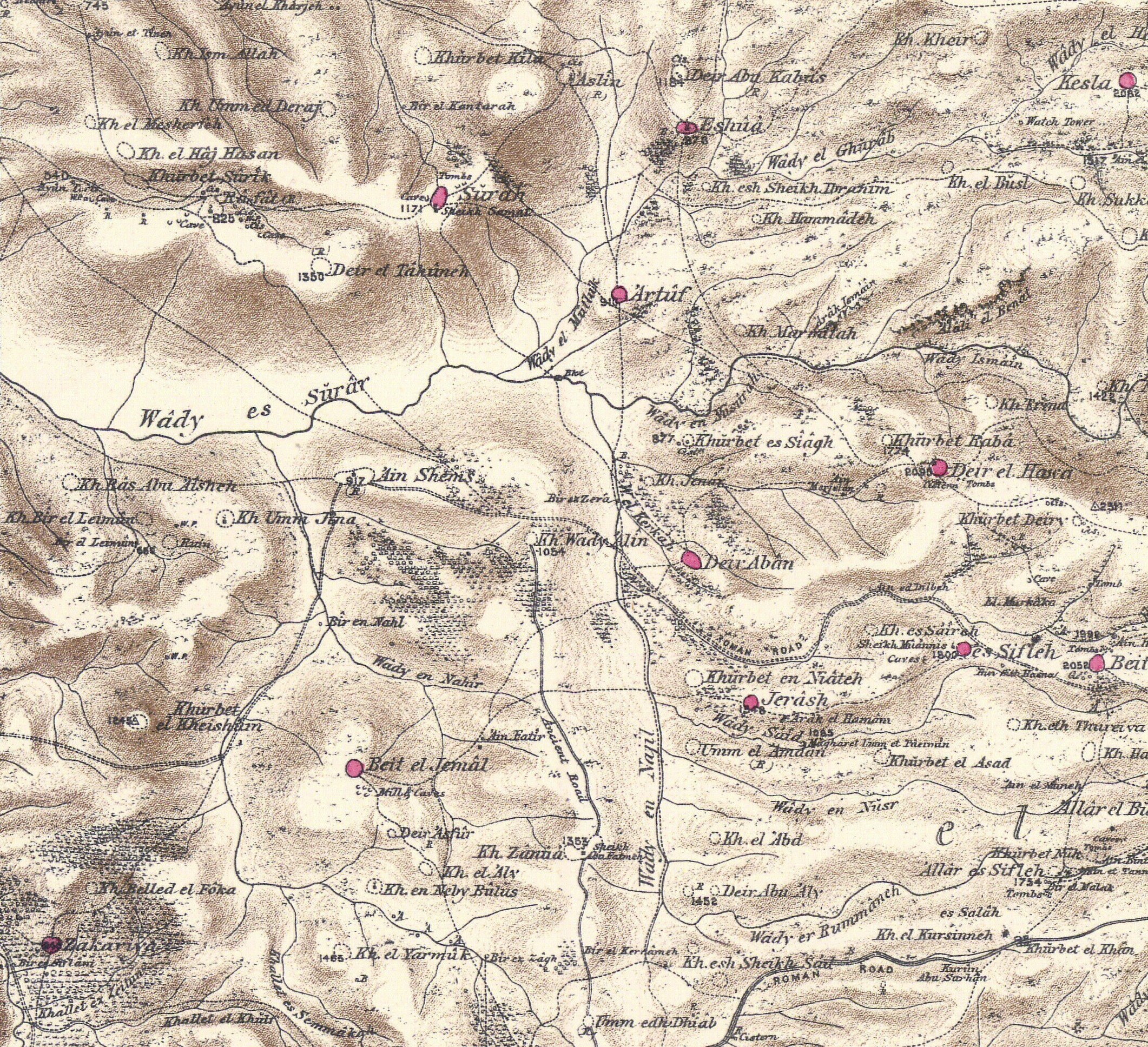
Ain Shems (today known as Tel Beit Shemesh) in the PEF Survey of Palestine c.1880. The pink circles are contemporary villages, and the dotted clear circles are ruins.

Tel Beit Shemesh is a small archaeological tell north west of the modern city of Beit Shemesh.

It was identified in the late 1830s as Biblical Beth Shemesh – it then was known as Ain Shams – by Edward Robinson. The tell was excavated in numerous phases during the 20th century.

== Etymology ==
Beit Shemesh means "house of the sun" or "temple of the sun" in Hebrew. The Chalcolithic city was originally named after the Canaanite sun goddess, Shapshu, who was worshipped there in antiquity; she is also referred to as "Shamash" after the Mesopotamian god.

The name Beth-Shemesh was shared by at least two other places in the Southern Levant, not including Heliopolis ("City of the Sun") in Egypt.

== History ==
The ruins of the ancient biblical city of the Canaanites at Tel Beit Shemesh in Modern Hebrew and Tell er-Rumeileh in Arabic, a tell (archaeological mound) situated immediately west of modern Beit Shemesh, and Moshav Yish'i, right on the west side of Highway 38.

=== Middle Bronze Age ===
The earliest mention of Beit Shemesh is found in ancient Egyptian execration texts, dating several hundred years earlier than its mention in the Hebrew canon.

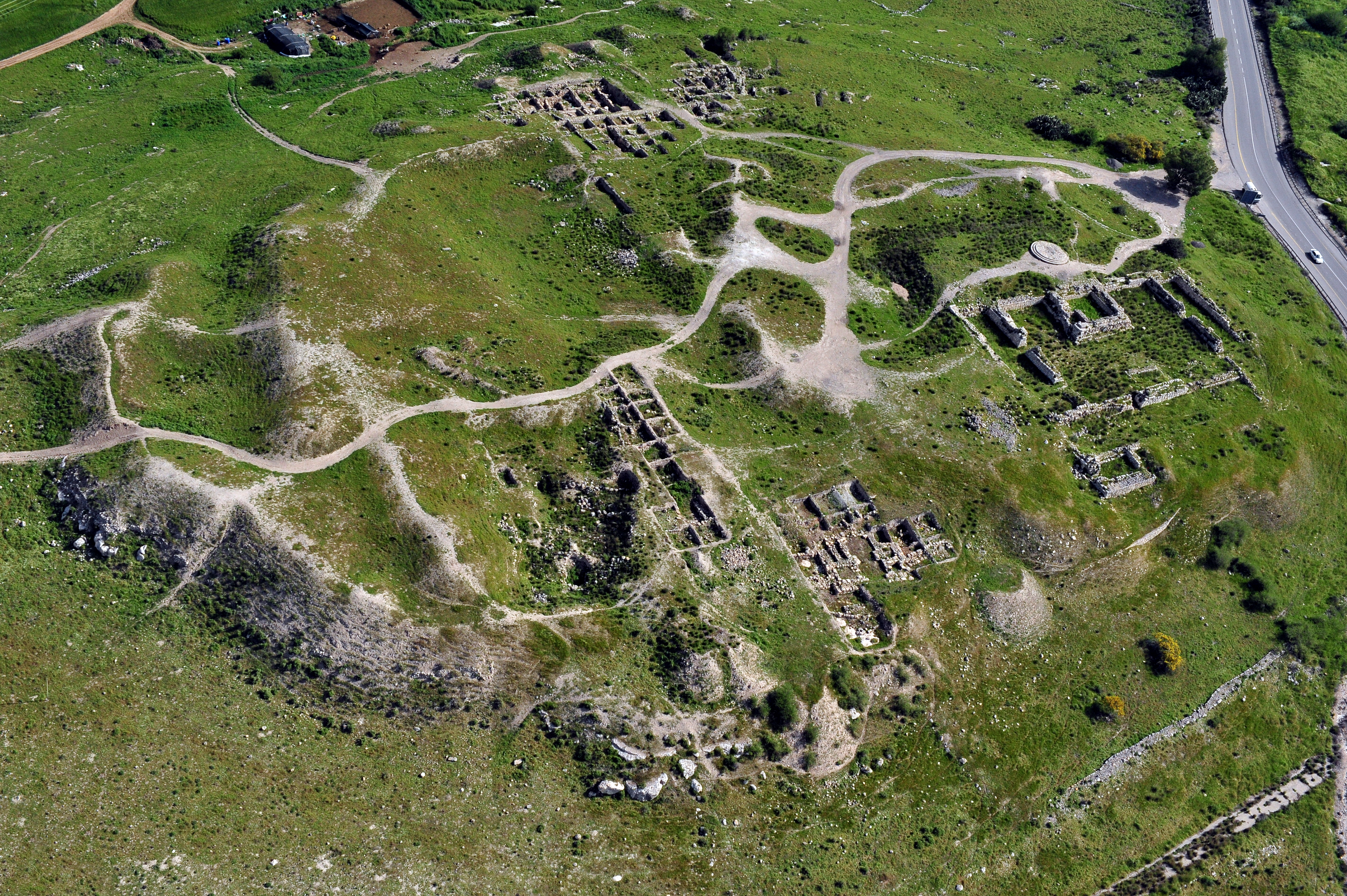
The ancient tell of Bet Shemesh

==== Middle Bronze II ====
Tel Beth-Shemesh (3 ha) Strata V. In the 17th century BCE, it had a massive fortification and southern gate.

- Middle Bronze IIB (c. 1630-1590 BCE). Fortification.
- Middle Bronze IIC (c. 1590-1550 BCE). Hyksos Period. Destruction layer.

The Southern Gate is a Syrian-style ‘three-entrance’ gate with a direct passageway flanked by two towers with three pairs of piers projecting into the passage.

=== Late Bronze Age ===
During the Late Bronze Age (LBA), the settlement was a prosperous city covering the entire tell, with connections to the eastern Mediterranean.

==== Late Bronze IB ====
LB IB Palace.

==== Late Bronze IIA ====
LB IIA Palace.

- Palace up to 10 rooms
- Imported pottery. Cretan LM IIIAI cup (TBS 19-103; cf. time of Amenhotep III); Cypriot Base Ring I juglets
- Not mentioned directly in the Amarna Archive. Beth-Shemesh was a sovereign city-state, see Amarna letters 273–274.
- 58,500 seeds found in Room L1505 in the palace representing twelve cultivated plant species, including cereals, pulses and fruits. Particularly large stores included nearly 6,700 fenugreek seeds and approximately 8,000 seeds of Cyprus vetch (Lathyrus ochrus).
- Destruction layer

At Tel Beth-Shemesh, a scarab belonging to Amenhotep III was found along with two Cretan LM IIIA1 cups. It was a commemorative scarab in association to the king's first heb sed festival.

=== Iron Age ===
Iron Age I. A border village.

- Iron I (c. 1150-950 BCE) Canaanite villages of Levels 7–4.

==== Kingdom of Judah ====
- Iron IIA Level 3 with Judahite administration.

Iron Age IIA. During the 10th century BCE, Beit Shemesh emerged from a Judahite village into a fortified settlement and provincial center in the Sorek Valley in the Shepelah. Archaeologists discovered massive public buildings, including a "patrician house" and an elaborate underground water reservoir.

The "Province/District of Beit Shemesh" was bordered in the West by the Philistines, and the neighboring city of Ekron (Tel Miqne). The border followed the natural transition where the Sorek Valley widens into the coastal plain. Here a heavily fortified line of Judean outposts included Beit Shemesh and Batash/Timnah. In the North, the province bordered the Kingdom of Israel. In the East, was the foothills of the Judean Mountains with the Sorek Valley pass going directly to the Jerusalem hinterland, making the Sorek Valley a military shield for Jerusalem against invasion by the Philistines or Egyptians. In the South, was the Elah Valley - a district contested between Judah city of Khirbet Qeiyafa and the Philistine city-state of Gath.

The economic role of the Sorek Valley was its high capacity for olive oil and grain production, functioning as a "breadbasket" for the Judean kingdom.

Animal bones show a distinct lack of pig bones in Iron Age strata. This contrasts sharply with contemporary Philistine sites (like nearby Ekron), where pork consumption was common, suggesting the inhabitants adhered to the dietary practices typical of the Israelite/Judean hill country.

An archaeomagnetic study has dated a destruction layer at the site to the first half of the 8th century BCE, correlating with the time when King Jehoash of Israel is recorded as having defeated King Amaziah of Judah in a battle fought there (2 Kings 14:11–13).

==== Assyrian period ====
After the destruction of much of the Southern Levant by the Neo-Assyrian Empire in 701 BCE, Beth Shemesh was abandoned. Judahites resettled Beth Shemesh, as evidenced by the refurbishment of the water reservoir in the 7th century.

==== Babylonian period ====
However, after the Neo-Babylonian Empire's conquest of Judah in the early 580s BCE, either the new Babylonian rulers, or the nearby Philistine metropolis of Ekron favoured by them, sealed and covered over the vital water reservoir, which was not uncovered until 2004. During the first return from the Babylonian captivity, the beginning of the Second Temple period, there was no lasting revival of the city.

=== Roman period ===
In the rescue excavations at the site, a rectangular gas-fired structure was discovered, which was identified by the excavators as a synagogue from the Second Temple period. The synagogue is supposed to be moved to another location to clear the area for Israel Highway 38, which is planned to be paved in the area. Boaz Gross, the head of the excavation expedition at the tel on behalf of the Israel Institute of Archaeology, believed that the structure is not Hasmonean but probably from the Herodian. The village around him, he believes, was abandoned during the Bar Kokhba revolt. According to him, purification bowls found near the building, its architectural design, as well as a bench identified inside, strengthen the assumption that it is a synagogue.

=== Byzantine period ===
A monastery and other remains from the Byzantine period have been found in the area.

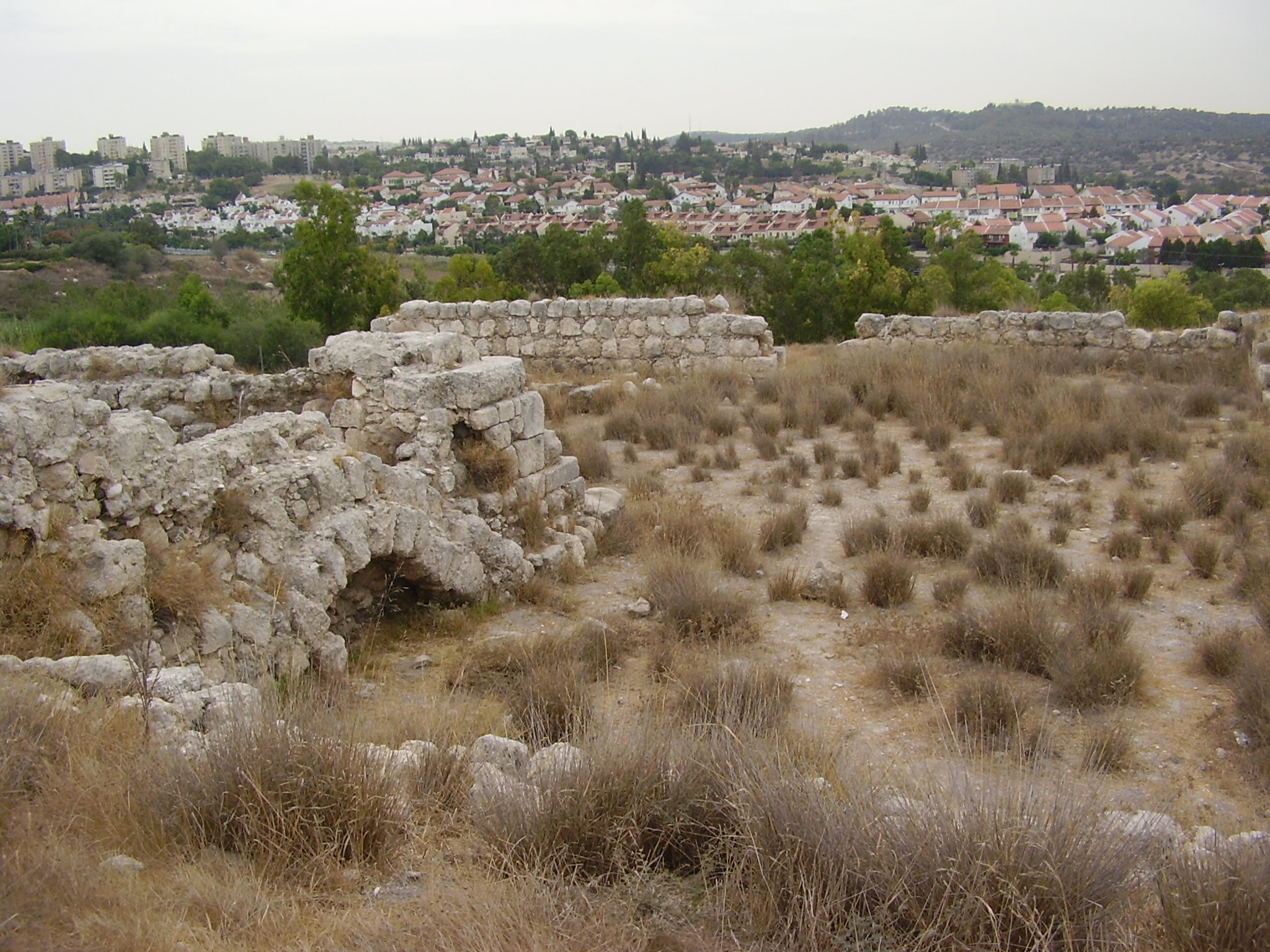
Ancient ruins against backdrop of modern Beit Shemesh

=== Ottoman period ===
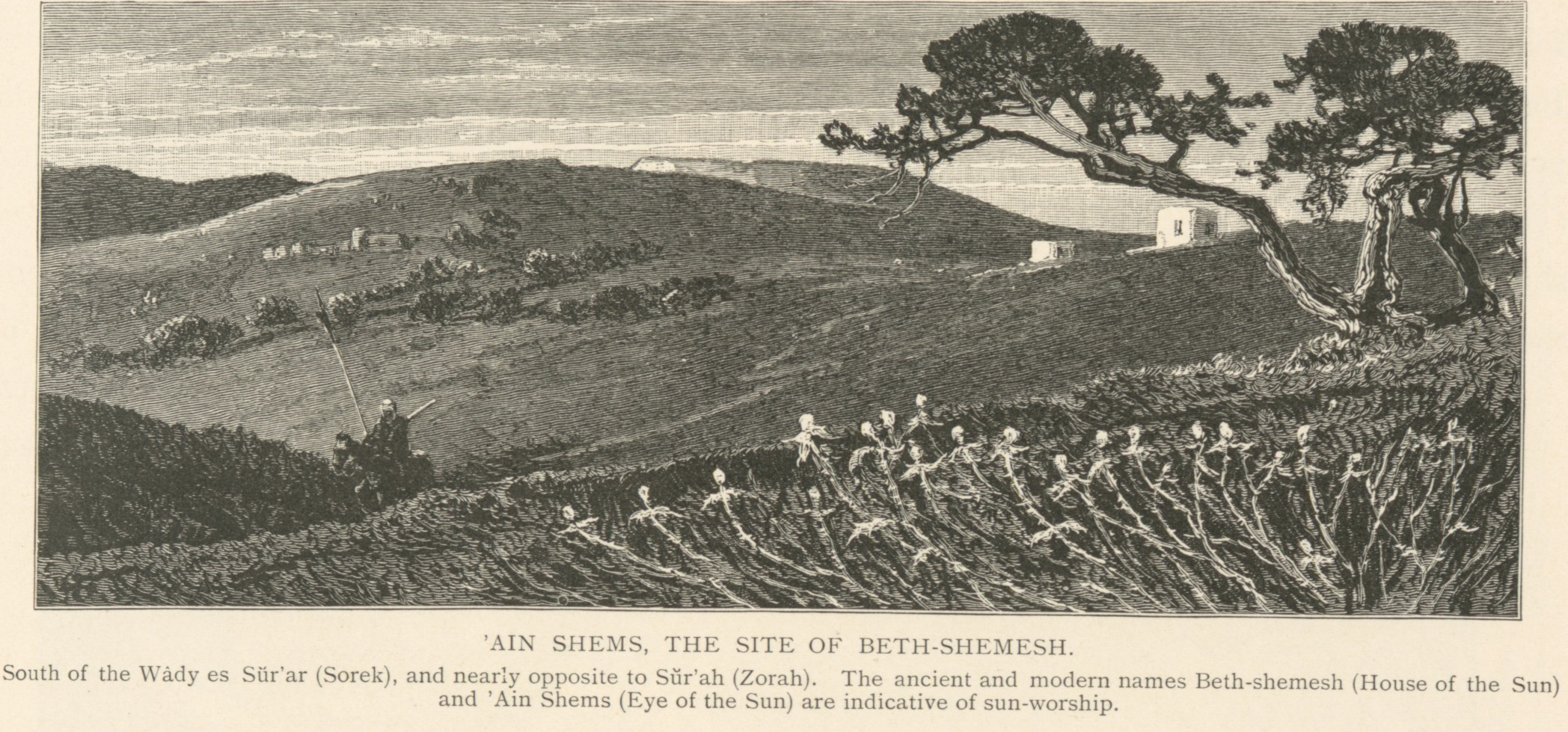
'Ain Shems, the site of Beth-Shemesh. South of the Wâdy es Sur'ar (Sorek) and nearly opposite to Sur'ah (Zorah). The ancient and modern names Beth-Shemesh (House of the Sun) and 'Ain Shems (NYPL b10607452-80663) (cropped)

The small Arab towns of Dayr Aban and Dayr Rafat used rocks for building from Tell er-Rumeileh (Tel Beit Shemesh).

In the late 19th century the area was known as 'Ain Shems or Khirbet 'Ain Shems and was used as a temporary harvest-time residence by local Arabs. The small mosque of Abu Mizar stood there.

=== State of Israel ===
During the 1948 Arab–Israeli War, the Egyptian Army occupied the area and set up a fortified post, called "Mishlat" in Hebrew, on a hill overlooking Beit Shemesh, within the Arab village Dayr Aban. The post changed hands several times during fighting. The Harel Brigade invaded part of the post for several months, giving rise to the name "the joint post" or the "Mishlat HaMeshutaf", with 60 meters dividing them and the enemy forces. The Mishlat was taken by the Harel force in the Ha-Har offensive, during the night of 19–20 October 1948, as part of an IDF campaign that captured Dayr Aban and surrounding villages southwest of Jerusalem.

Beit Shemesh is the point from which the so-called Convoy of 35 set out to bring provisions to besieged Gush Etzion. On 15 January 1948, a group of 38 Palmach volunteers left Hartuv near Beit Shemesh. After one member of the group sprained his ankle and returned, accompanied by two others, the group, now numbering 35, continued on its way. Their presence was discovered by two Arab women who encountered two scouts of the group near Surif. (An earlier version, that the soldiers were discovered by an Arab shepherd who they graciously let go, was based on a eulogy written by Ben-Gurion and is apparently apocryphal). The Convoy of 35 was subsequently killed in fighting with Arab villagers and militiamen.

== Hebrew Bible ==
Beit Shemesh is mentioned in the Hebrew Bible in the Book of Joshua (Joshua 15:10), as a city in the territory of the tribe of Judah on the border with the tribe of Dan. In Joshua 21:16, this city was set aside as one of the 13 Kohanic cities for the priests of the tribe of Levi, the Kohanim.

Another city by the same name, Beit Shemesh, is later mentioned in Joshua 19:38 as situated in the territory of the tribe of Naphtali.

The city located in the territorial bounds of the tribe of Judah is mentioned in 1 Samuel 6 as being the first city encountered by the Ark of the Covenant on its way back from Philistia after having been captured by the Philistines in battle (1 Samuel 6:12–21). According to the chapter, God struck the many people of Beth Shemesh who looked into the Ark and they died (וַיַּ֞ךְ בְּאַנְשֵׁ֣י בֵֽית־שֶׁ֗מֶשׁ). The stone on which the Ark was placed is recorded as still being located there at the time of writing the Books of Samuel. In the King James Version, this stone is described as "the great stone of Abel" in 6:18.

In 2 Kings 14, Beth Shemesh is again mentioned as being the site of the battle between King Amaziah of Judah and King Jehoash of Israel.

== Archaeology ==
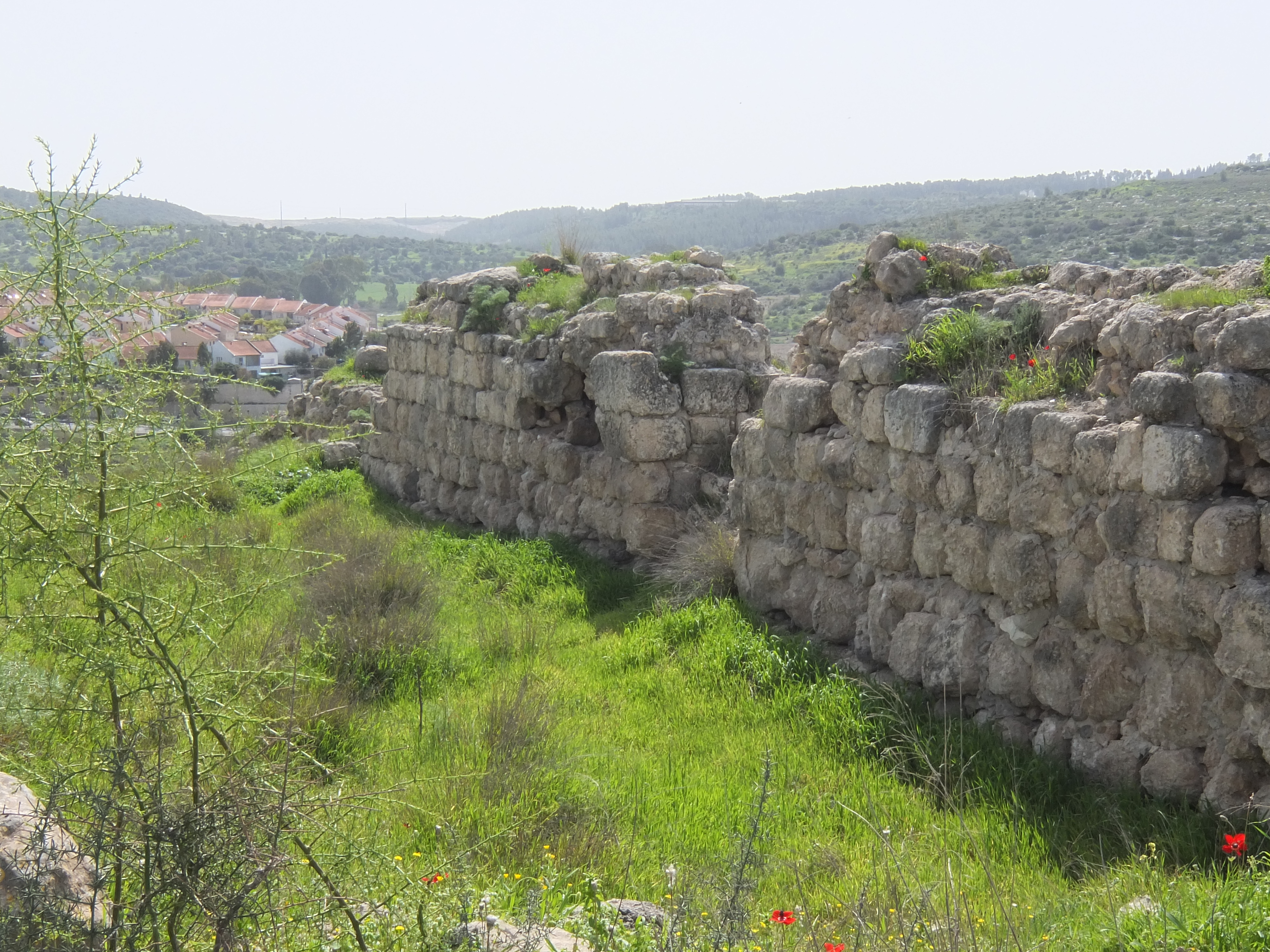
Old wall of the ancient ruin, Beit Shemesh

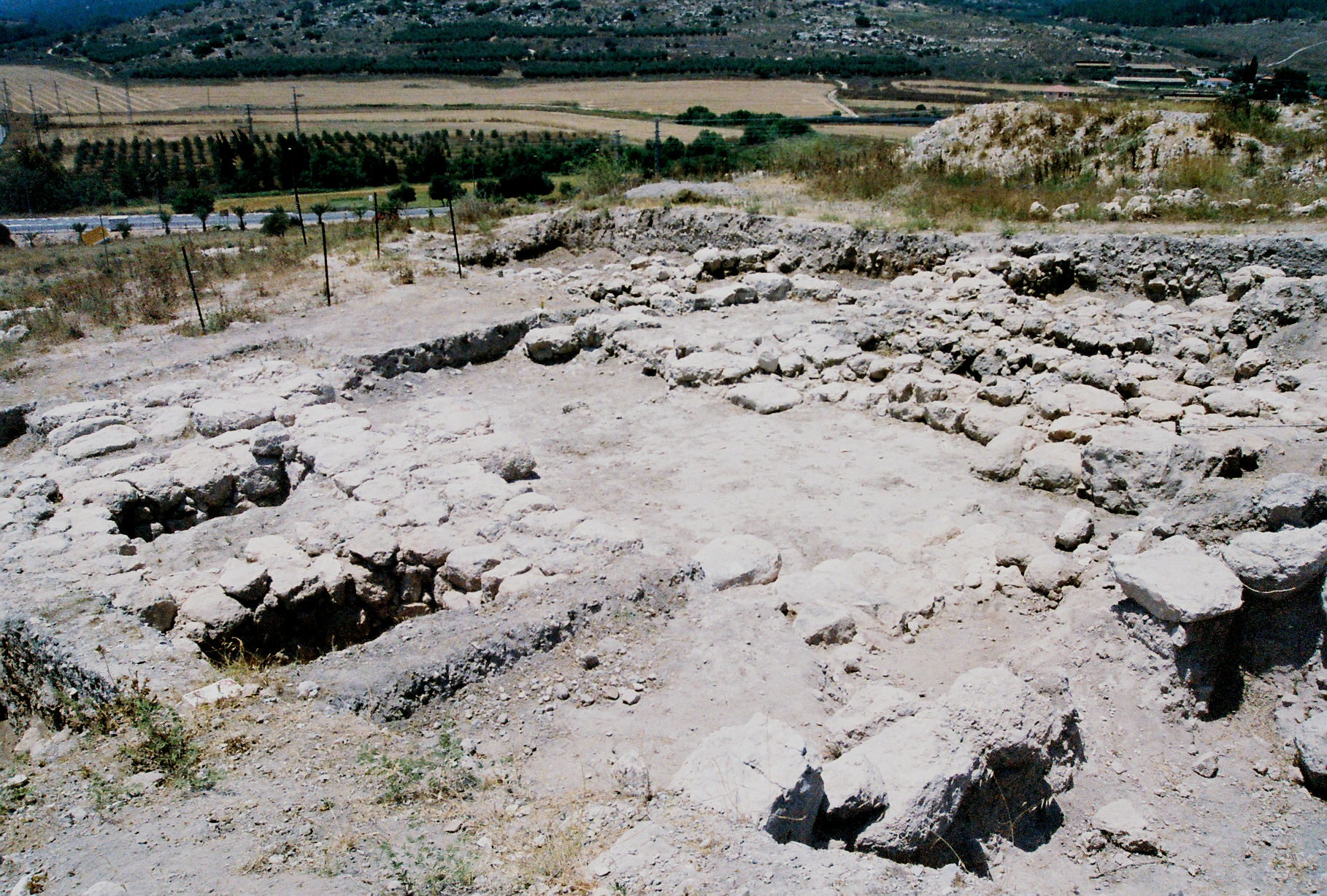
Middle Bronze gate system unearthed at Tel Beth-Shemesh

From 1911 to 1913 the site was excavated by a Palestine Exploration Fund team led by Duncan Mackenzie.

The site was excavated from 1928 to 1933 by a Haverford College, Pennsylvania team led by Elihu Grant. A fractured Late Bronze Age cuneiform tablet was found.

Work resumed from 1990 to 1996 led by Shlomo Bunimovitz and Zvi Lederman under the auspices of the Department of the Land of Israel Studies at Bar-Ilan University and the Department of Bible and Ancient Near Eastern Studies at Ben-Gurion University of the Negev.

=== Late Bronze and Iron Age ===
The most ancient iron workshop in the world was discovered in Beit Shemesh in 2003. The only remnants of a fortified city with an advanced water system, from the time of the early Kingdom of Judah was found here. The bones of animals found in the 12th–11th centuries BCE layer indicate a diet typical of the Israelites who inhabited the hill country in this period. These together with the pottery finds indicate the cultural influences on the inhabitants of this border town. However, it is not possible to determine their specific ethnic identity, which could be Canaanite, Philistine, or Israelite.

In August 2012, archaeologists from Tel Aviv University announced the discovery of a circular stone seal, approximately 15 millimetres in diameter. The seal was found on the floor of a house at Beit Shemesh and is dated to the 12th century BCE. According to Haaretz, "excavation directors Prof. Shlomo Bunimovitz and Dr. Zvi Lederman of Tel Aviv University say they do not suggest that the human figure on the seal is the biblical Samson. Rather, the geographical proximity to the area where Samson lived, and the time period of the seal, show that a story was being told at the time of a hero who fought a lion, and that the story eventually found its way into the biblical text and onto the seal."

Animal bones found nearby may also be a clue to boundary disputes between different cultures. Pig bones have been found a few kilometers from Beit Shemesh, but only a few have been found actually at Beit Shemesh and at some point during the 11th century BCE it appears that the local population stopped eating pig. Haaretz reported that "According to Bunimovitz, when the pork-eating Philistines arrived in the country from the Aegean, the local people stopped eating pork to differentiate themselves from the newcomers."

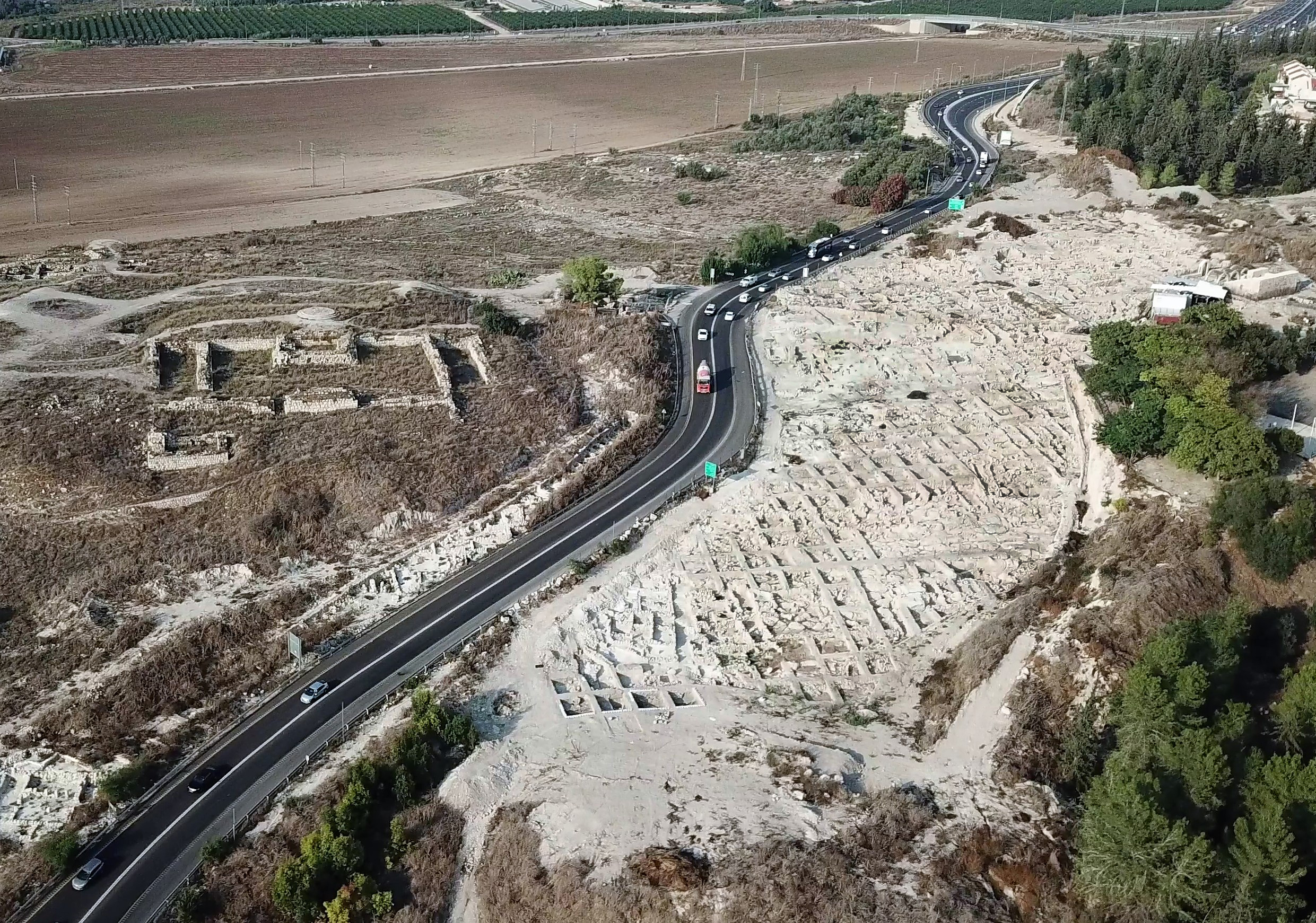
Tel Beit Shemesh on the left, and on the right the large salvage excavation that revealed the eastern part of the mound

As part of the works to expand a nearby road, Route 38, many archaeological finds were uncovered in Tel Beit Shemesh, the Beit Shemesh Municipality promoted the transformation of the complex into a visitor center and park with an investment of tens of millions of shekels. National Roads Company of Israel agreed to significantly reduce the width of Route 38, which crosses Tel Beit Shemesh, after archaeologists warned that it might bury rare and unusual artifacts from the First Temple period that were discovered there.

In these excavations, an impressive settlement from the end of the days of the biblical Kingdom of Judah was discovered, whose very existence challenges the accepted view regarding the history of the Kingdom of Judah during the reign of Assyria. So far it has been claimed that the city of Beit Shemesh was destroyed during the campaign to suppress Hezekiah's rebellion by the Assyrian king Sennacherib in 701 BC, and that the lowland area was torn from the sovereignty of the Kingdom of Judah. However, the new discoveries showed that after its destruction the settlement was re-founded on the eastern slopes of the tel, and was used As an important administrative and economic center of the Kingdom of Judah under the rule of the Neo-Assyrian Empire.

=== Later history ===
In the excavations, they also discovered a dense system of public buildings, storage rooms, and agricultural industrial facilities, including 14 oil mills for the storage of olive oil from the days of the Kingdom of Judah. Next to one of the canvas houses, a large cellar was discovered with plastered floors and walls. Also, more than 44 royal seals identified with the period of King Hezekiah were discovered in the hundreds of structures that were uncovered. According to Lederman's hypothesis, the site west of Beit Shemesh was a row of royal agricultural farms, which Hezekiah established mainly to produce olive oil. The salvage excavation indicates that, contrary to the accepted view, according to which the Judean plain was emptied of its Jewish population in the seventh century BC, Beit Shemesh had a high-level built settlement with a sophisticated and profitable industry.

Calcite alabaster was quarried in ancient times in the cave known today as the Twins Cave near Beit Shemesh. Herod used this alabaster for baths in his palaces during the 1st century BCE.

In 2014, archaeologists Irene Zilberbod and Tehila Libman announced the nearby discovery of a large compound from the Byzantine period that was most probably a monastery. It comprised a residential area and an industrial area with wine and olive presses. The remains of buildings with two or three stories and impressive mosaic floors were discovered. The compound ceased to function in the early Muslim period and was subsequently occupied by other residents. The excavations were continuing with additional finds through late 2017.
