= Segula =

Segula may refer to:

- Segula (Kabbalah), a protective or benevolent incantation or ritual in Kabbalistic and Talmudic tradition
- Segula Island, an island in the Rat Islands of the Aleutian Islands, Alaska
- Sgula, a moshav in the Yoav Regional Council, Southern District, Israel
- Segula Technologies, a French industrial engineering company
