= Highway 38 (Israel) =

Highway in Israel

Coordinates: 31°42′06″N 34°56′53″E

Highway 38
- כביש 38
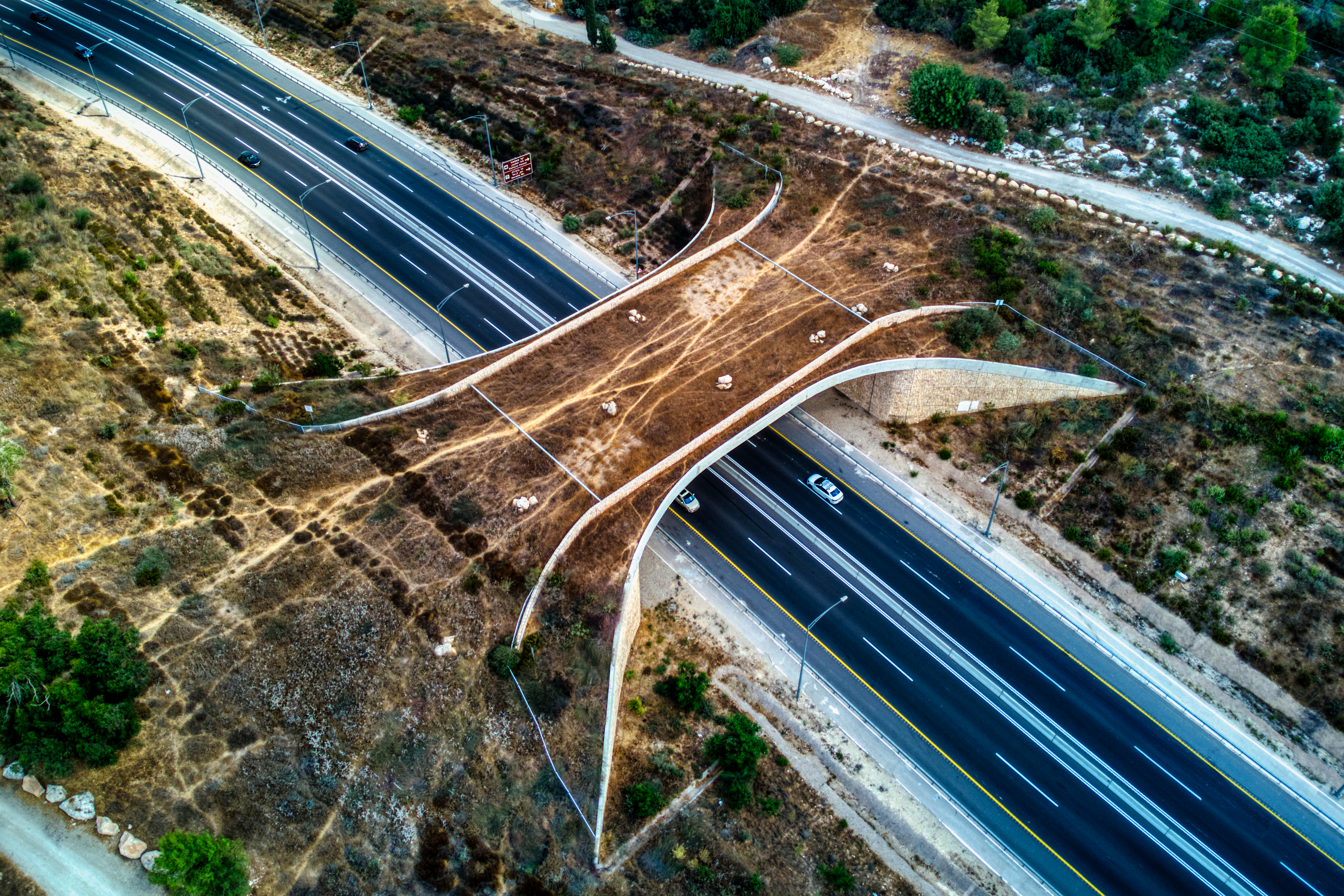
- Wildlife crossing between Mesilat Zion and Eshtaol, Road 38 (Israel)

Route information
- Length: 29 km (18 mi)

Major junctions
- South end: Nehusha Junction
- HaEla Junction; Ramat Beit Shemesh Junction; Beit Shemesh Junction; Shimshon Interchange
- North end: Sha'ar HaGai Interchange

Location
- Country: Israel
- Major cities: Beit Shemesh

Highway system
- Roads in Israel; Highways
← Highway 35	→ Highway 40

Highway 38 is an arterial road in the low plains of Judea in Israel. It serves as the main access route to Beit Shemesh and as a main north–south route in the region. Along the route are many nature preserves and archeological sites.

== Route ==
Highway 38 travels in a north-northeast direction as it winds through the western foothills of the Judaean Mountains from Highway 35 at Nehusha Junction near Beit Guvrin to Highway 1 at Sha'ar HaGai Interchange.

Along many stretches, it follows small valleys formed by northward turns of westward streams emanating from the mountains to the east, notably, the Yoresh, Hakhlil, Yarmut and Kisalon Streams. Between the stream valleys and north of Eshtaol the road rises and falls as it crosses the many east–west ridges.

== History ==
From biblical times the road is mentioned in 1 Samuel 6:12 as the route taken by the Philistines returning the Ark of the Covenant to the Israelites in Beth-Shemesh.

During the Roman period, the road was an important route as evidenced by milestones found near Givat Yeshayahu as part of the road from Ashkelon via Highway 35 to Beit Guvrin, northward along Highway 38, then westward via the Elah Valley to Jerusalem.

In 1948, the Latrun section of Highway 1 was taken over by Jordan. Traffic between Tel Aviv and Jerusalem was diverted to a new route called "Kvish HaGvura" (Road of Bravery) of which Highway 38 served as the connection between Highway 44 at Shimshon Junction and Highway 1 at Sha'ar HaGai. This section of the road was straightened and widened in 1960.

At the end of 2012, the National Roads Company of Israel published tenders to upgrade the northern section of the road creating a divided highway with two lanes in each direction between Beit Shemesh and Sha'ar HaGai. The government granted approval on 6 June 2013. The approval was made through the special "Housing Cabinet" since the road's expansion is a condition for plans to build an additional apartments and homes in Beit Shemesh.

The newly rebuilt highway costing 800M shekels was inaugurated in September, 2017. Bridge interchanges at Naham/Hartuv, Shimshon Junction/Eshtaol and Mesilat Zion with tunnel interchanges at the Sha'ar HaGai Caravanserai and the Burma Road were completed. A wildlife bridge was built near Mesilat Zion and the road was raised to overpass the railway tracks at Beit Shemesh. The road includes highway lighting and bicycle paths along its entire length. The upgrade of the once relatively unsafe road into a modern highway will significantly cut travel time between Beit Shemesh and Tel Aviv or Jerusalem and allow the area's population to grow significantly.

== Junctions & Interchanges (South to North) ==
District	Location	km	mi	Name	Destinations	Notes
Southern	Beit Guvrin	0	0.0	צומת נחושה (Nehusha Junction)	Highway 35	
Jerusalem	Nehusha	4.7	2.9	צומת מושב נחושה (Moshav Nehusha Junction)	Road 3543	
Jerusalem	Srigim; Givat Yeshayahu	7.8	4.8	צומת שריגים (Moshav Nehusha Junction)	Route 353; Road 3544	
Jerusalem	Valley of Elah	10.1	6.3	צומת האלה (HaElah Junction)	Route 375	
Jerusalem	Azekah	11.9	7.4	צומת עזקה (Azekah Junction)	Route 383	
Jerusalem	Zekharia	12.7	7.9	צומת זכריה (Zekharia Junction)	Entrance to Zekharia	
Jerusalem	Beit Shemesh	15.2	9.4	מחלף רמת בית שמש (Ramat Beit Shemesh Interchange)	Nahal Nove'a St.	
Jerusalem	Brosh West Industrial Area	17.2	10.7	צומת ברוש (Brosh Junction)	Virginia St.	
Jerusalem	Yish'i	18.7	11.6	צומת ישעי (Yish'i Junction)	Road 3833	
Jerusalem	Beit Shemesh	20.2	12.6	צומת בית שמש (Beit Shemesh Junction)	Road 3835	
Jerusalem	Beit Shemesh	20.9	13.0	צומת הרטוב (Hartuv Junction)	Road 3855 (Beit Shemesh Rd 10), Eretz Hachaim cemetery	
Jerusalem	Hartuv	22.1	13.7	מחלף הרטוב (Hartuv Interchange)	HaTa'asiya St.	
Jerusalem	Eshtaol	23	14	מחלף שמשון (Shimshon Interchange)	Highway 44	
Jerusalem	Eshtaol	23.3	14.5	מחלף שמשון (Shimshon Interchange)	Route 395	
Jerusalem	Mesilat Zion	26	16	מחלף מסילת ציון (Mesilat Zion Interchange)	Chochin St.	
Jerusalem	Sha'ar HaGai	28.9	18.0	מחלף שער הגיא (Sha'ar HaGai Interchange)	Highway 1	
1.000 mi = 1.609 km; 1.000 km = 0.621 mi

== Gallery ==
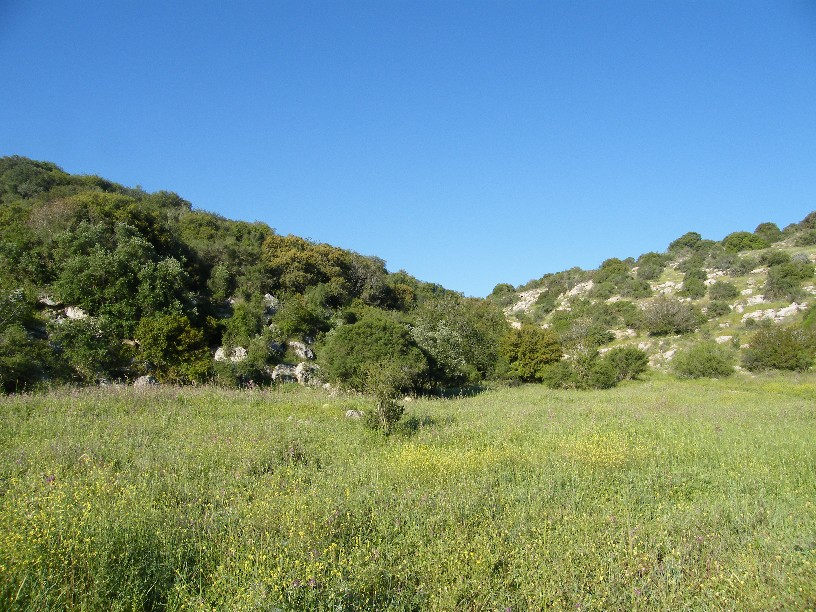
Valley of Elah woodland

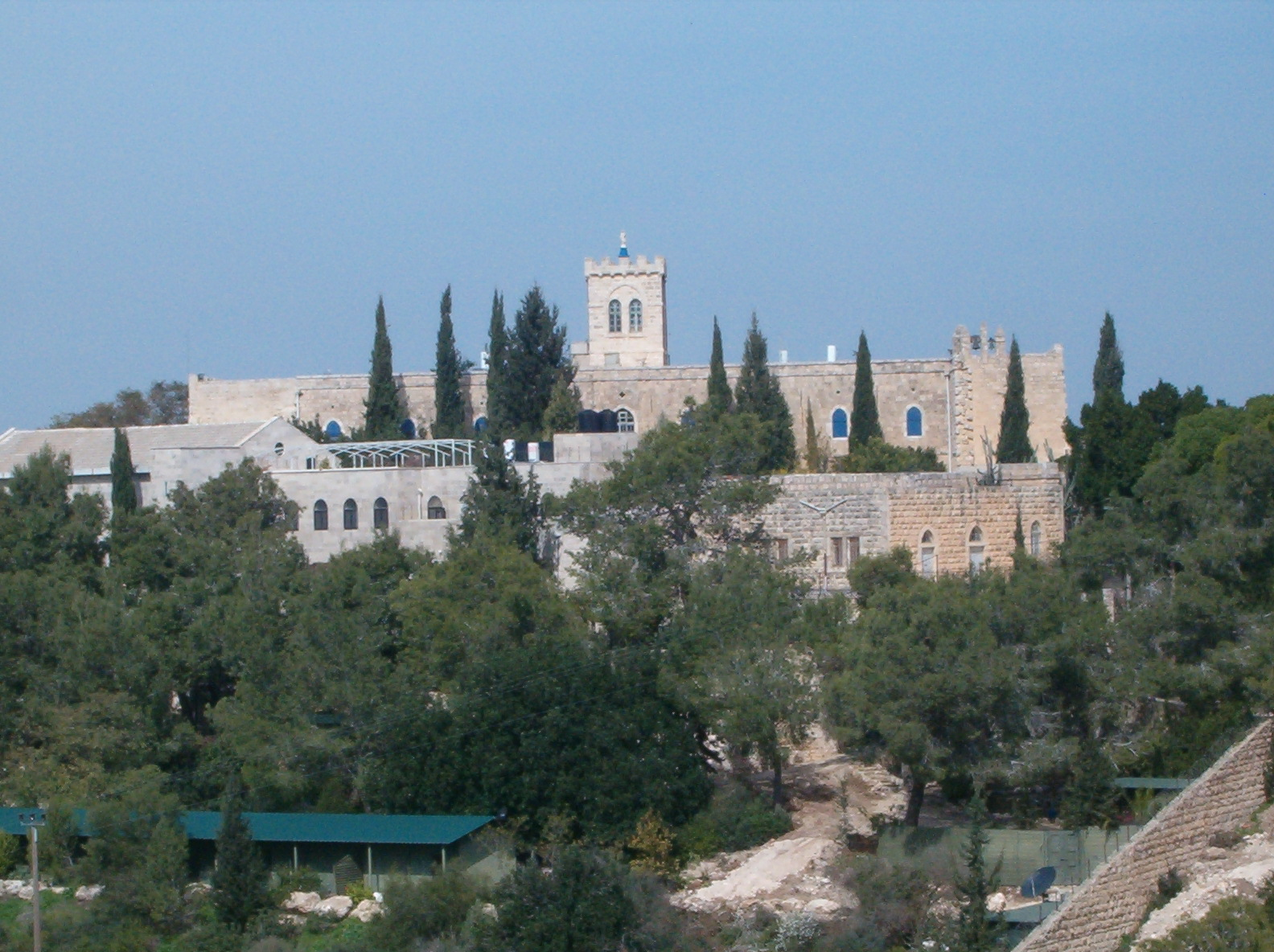
Beit Jimal Monastery

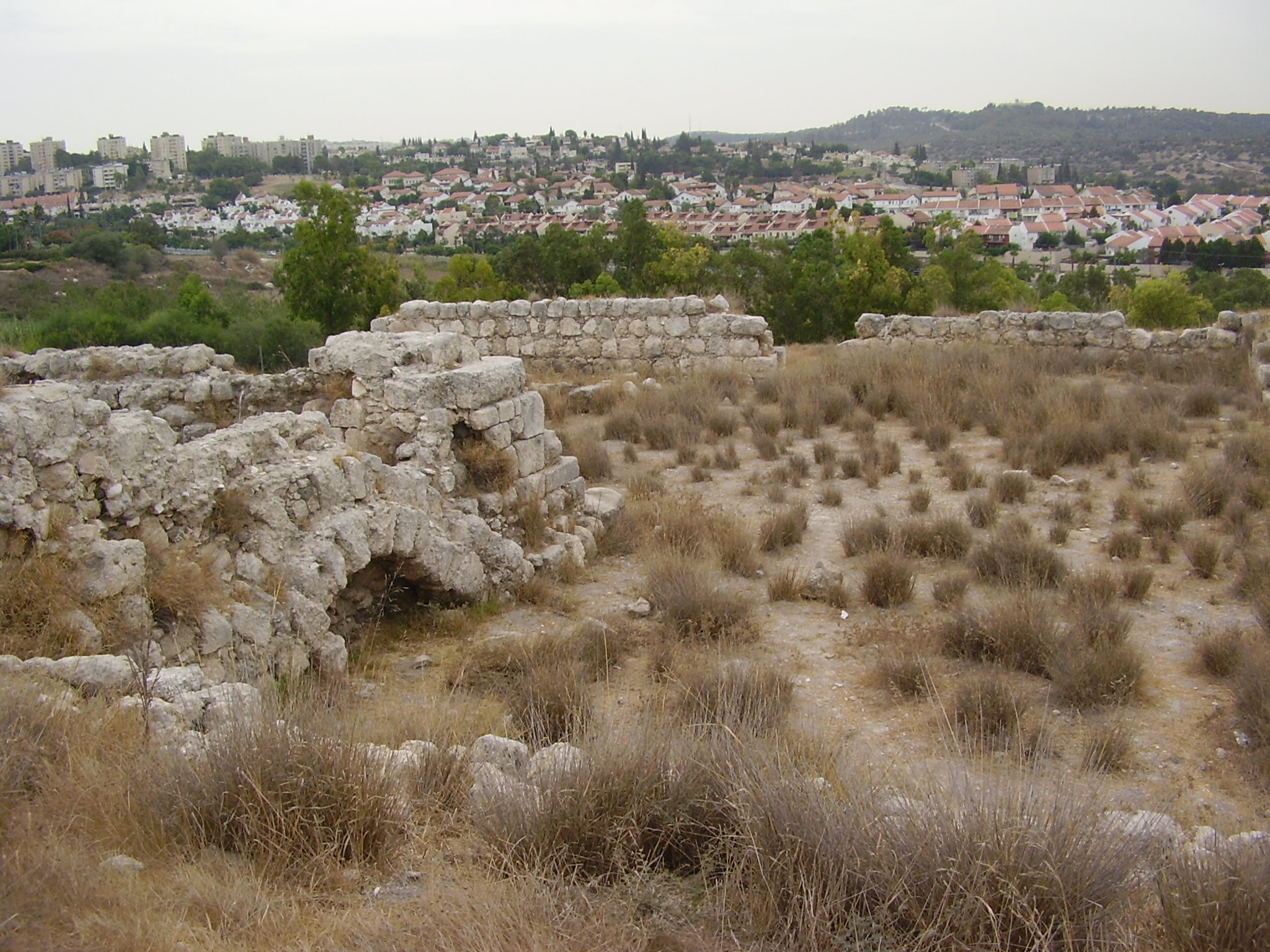
Tel Beit Shemesh overlooking modern city

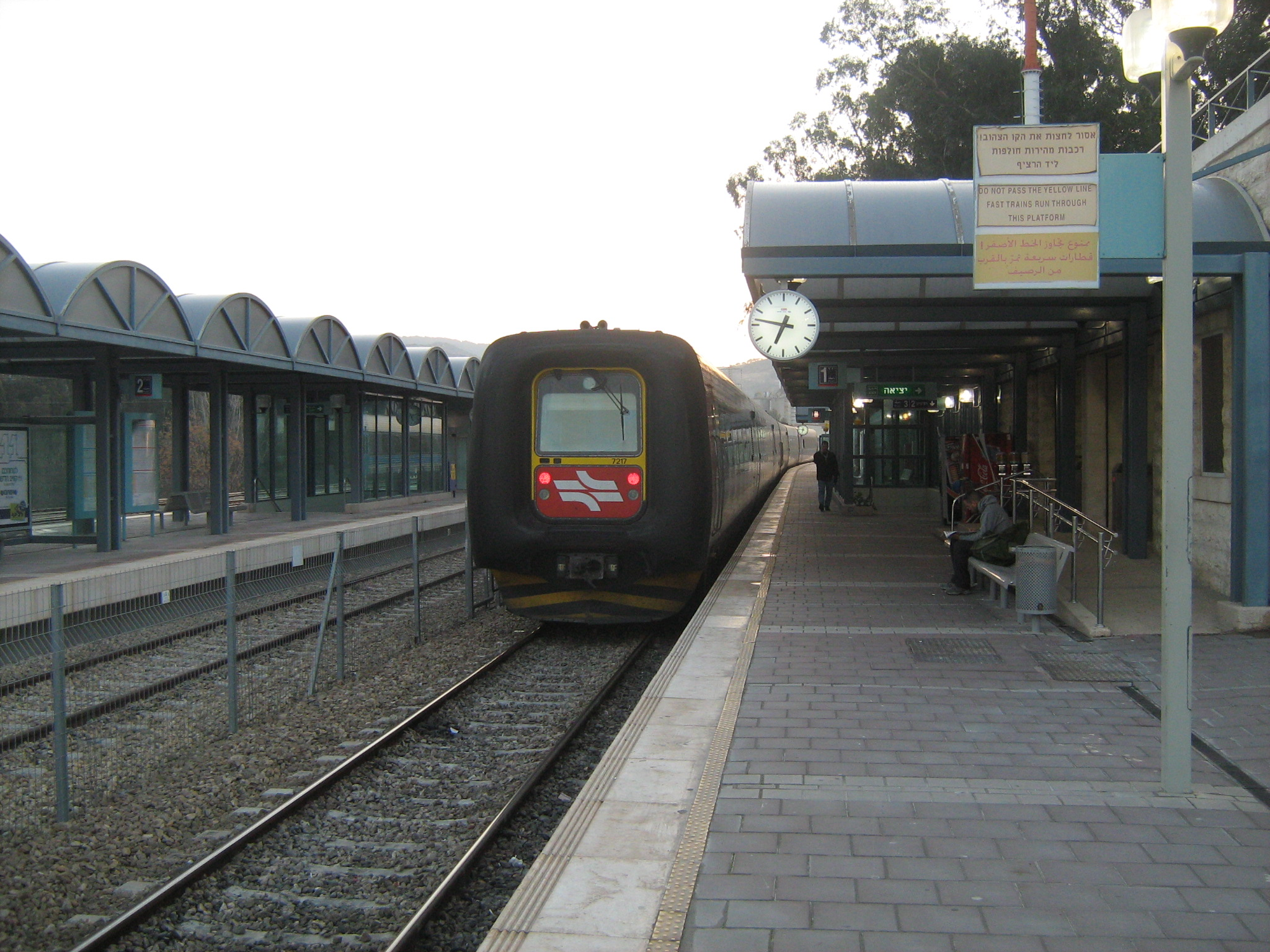
Beit Shemesh Railway Station

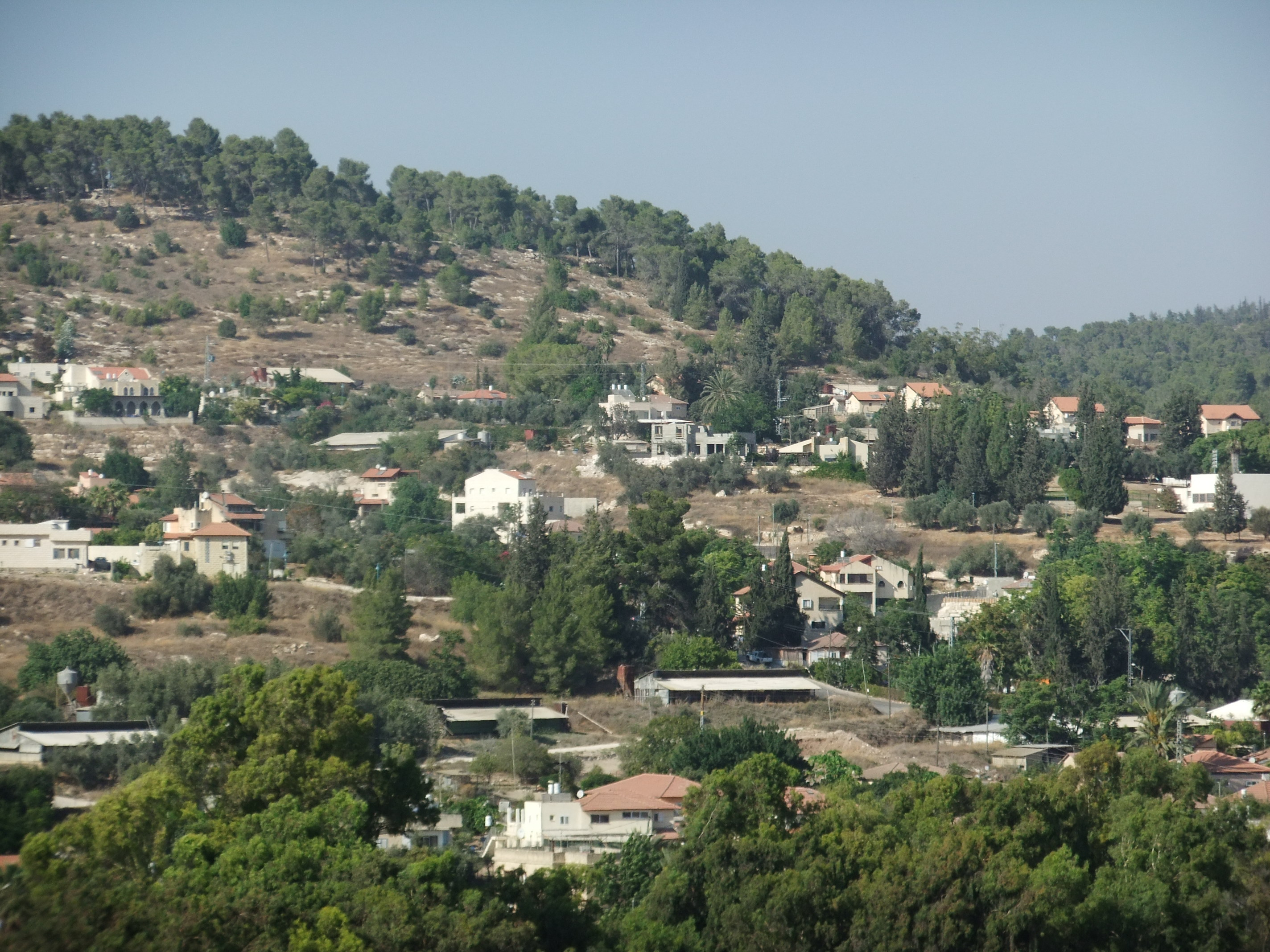
Eshta'ol

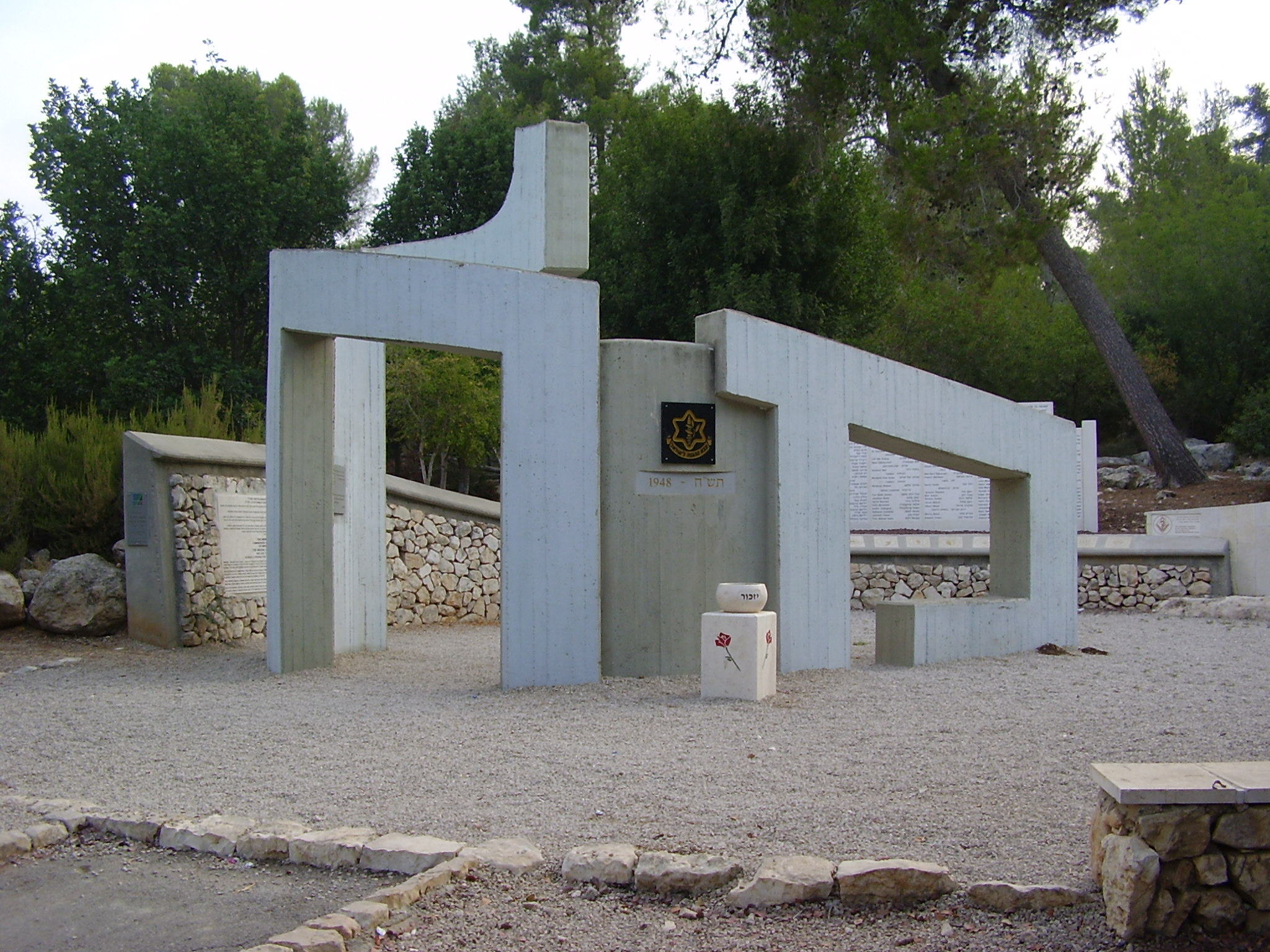
Mahal Memorial on the Burma Road

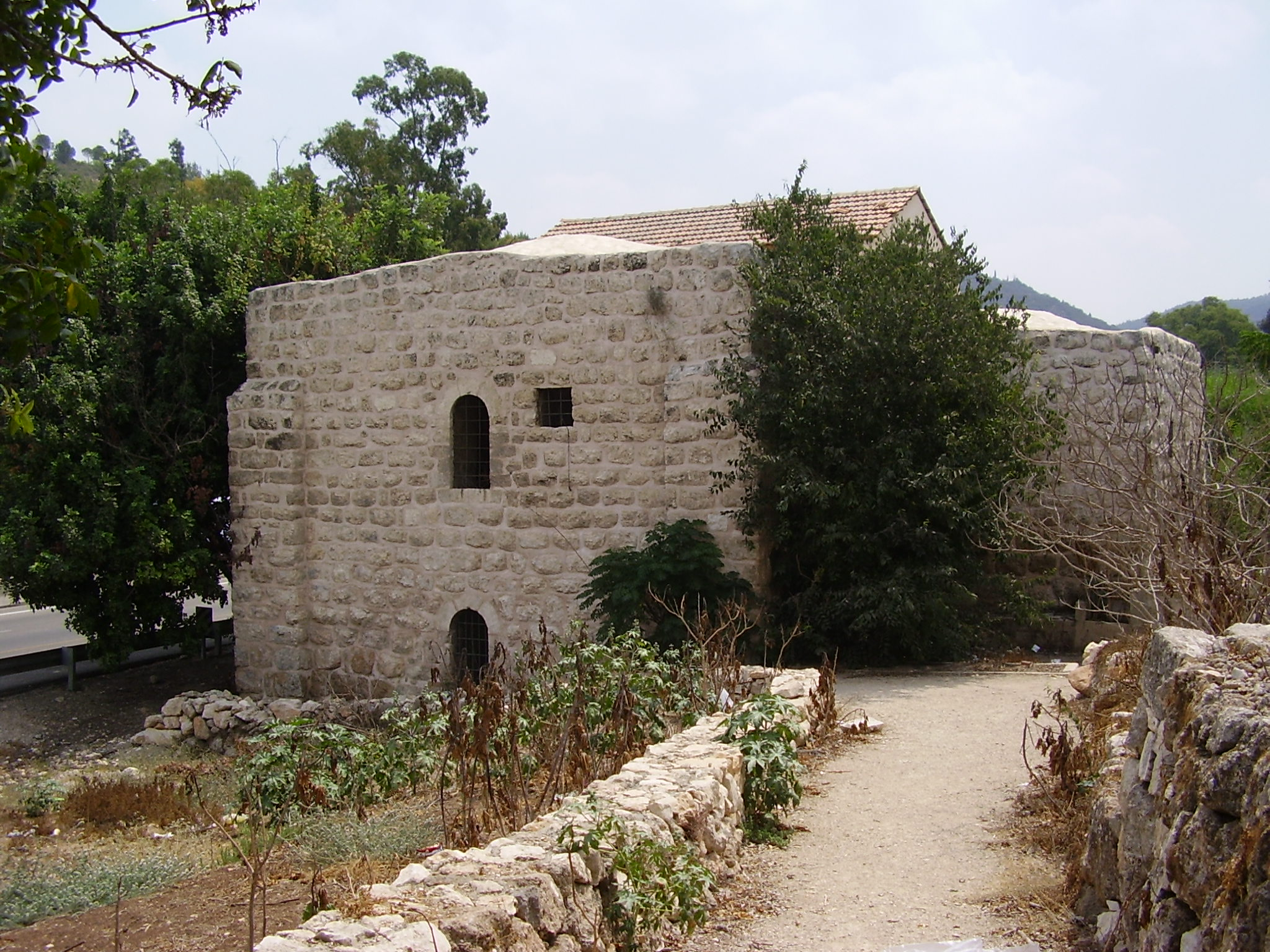
Sha'ar HaGai Caravanserai (Ottoman Khan)

== See also ==
- List of highways in Israel
