= Yoav Regional Council =

Coordinates: 31.600°N 34.900°E

Yoav Regional Council מועצה אזורית יואב مجلس إقليمي يوآف
- Regional council (from 1953)
- Interactive map of Yoav Regional Council
- Country: Israel
- District: Southern
- Subdistrict: Ashkelon
- Natural region: Lakhish, Malakhi

Government
  - Head of Municipality: Nati Lerner

Area
  - Total: 198,970 dunams (198.97 km^{2}; 76.82 sq mi)

Population (2024)
  - Total: 9,274
  - Density: 46.61/km^{2} (120.7/sq mi)
- Website: www.yoav.org.il

Yoav Regional Council (Hebrew: מועצה אזורית יואב, Mo'atza Azorit Yoav) is a regional council in the Southern District of Israel. It is located near the cities of Kiryat Gat, Kiryat Malakhi and Ashkelon. It was founded in 1952, covering an area of 230,000 dunams (230 km^{2}), with a population of about 9,274 as of 2024.

The council is named after Yitzhak Dubno, who was nicknamed "Yoav", and who fell while defending Negba in the 1947–1949 Palestine war. Operation Yoav and Metzudat Yoav, which is located in the council's area, are also named after him.

The council contains two parts which are not contiguous geographically. The main part is bordered on the north by Nahal Sorek Regional Council, on the west by Be'er Tuvia Regional Council and Shafir Regional Council, on the south by Lakhish Regional Council and Kiryat Gat, and on the east by Matte Yehuda Regional Council. The western portion of the council, which includes the kibbutzim Negba and Sde Yoav, is bordered on the north and east by Shafir Regional Council, on the west by Hof Ashkelon Regional Council, and on the west by Lakhish Regional Council.

== Communities in the council ==
Today the council has 8 kibbutzim, 3 moshavim, a youth village, a community settlement, and an Arab village.

The immediate past mayor of the Yoav Regional Council is Rani Traynin from Beit Nir. Traynin resigned his position as mayor to become the Vice Chairman of the Executive of the Jewish Agency for Israel. He was succeeded by Matti Sarfati Harkavi, the first woman ever elected Mayor of the Yoav Regional Council. She is from moshav Sgula and is a noted plant geneticist. For several years she served as the Yoav Chairperson of the Partnership 2000 Committee, linking the Yoav Regional Council with the Jewish community of the Lehigh Valley based in Allentown, Pennsylvania.

The government offices are located at Re'em Junction.

=== Kibbutzim ===
- Beit Nir
- Beit Guvrin
- Gal On
- Gat
- Kfar Menachem
- Negba
- Revadim
- Sde Yoav

=== Moshavim ===
- Kfar HaRif
- Nahla
- Sgula

=== Youth village ===
- Kedma

=== Community settlement ===
- Vardon

=== Arab village ===
- al-'Azi

== Demographics ==
Historical population
Year	Pop.	±%
1972	3,200	—
1983	3,700	+15.6%
1995	3,500	−5.4%
2008	5,810	+66.0%
2022	9,132	+57.2%
2024	9,274	+1.6%

== Voting Patterns ==
In the 2022 election, 82 percent of voters in the regional council voted for the parties of the center-left coalition led by Yair Lapid, while 18 percent voted for the parties of the right-wing coalition led by Benjamin Netanyahu and 0.6 percent voted for the Arab parties.

In the 2026 election, 79 percent of voters in the regional council voted for the parties of the center-left coalition led by Gadi Eisenkot, while 15 percent voted for the parties of the right-wing coalition led by Benjamin Netanyahu and 2 percent voted for the Arab parties. An additional 3.4 percent voted for the Reservists, and 1.1 percent voted for Amcha Yisrael. Voter turnout increased 14 percent from the 2022 election.
