= Matti Sarfati Harkavi =

Israeli politician

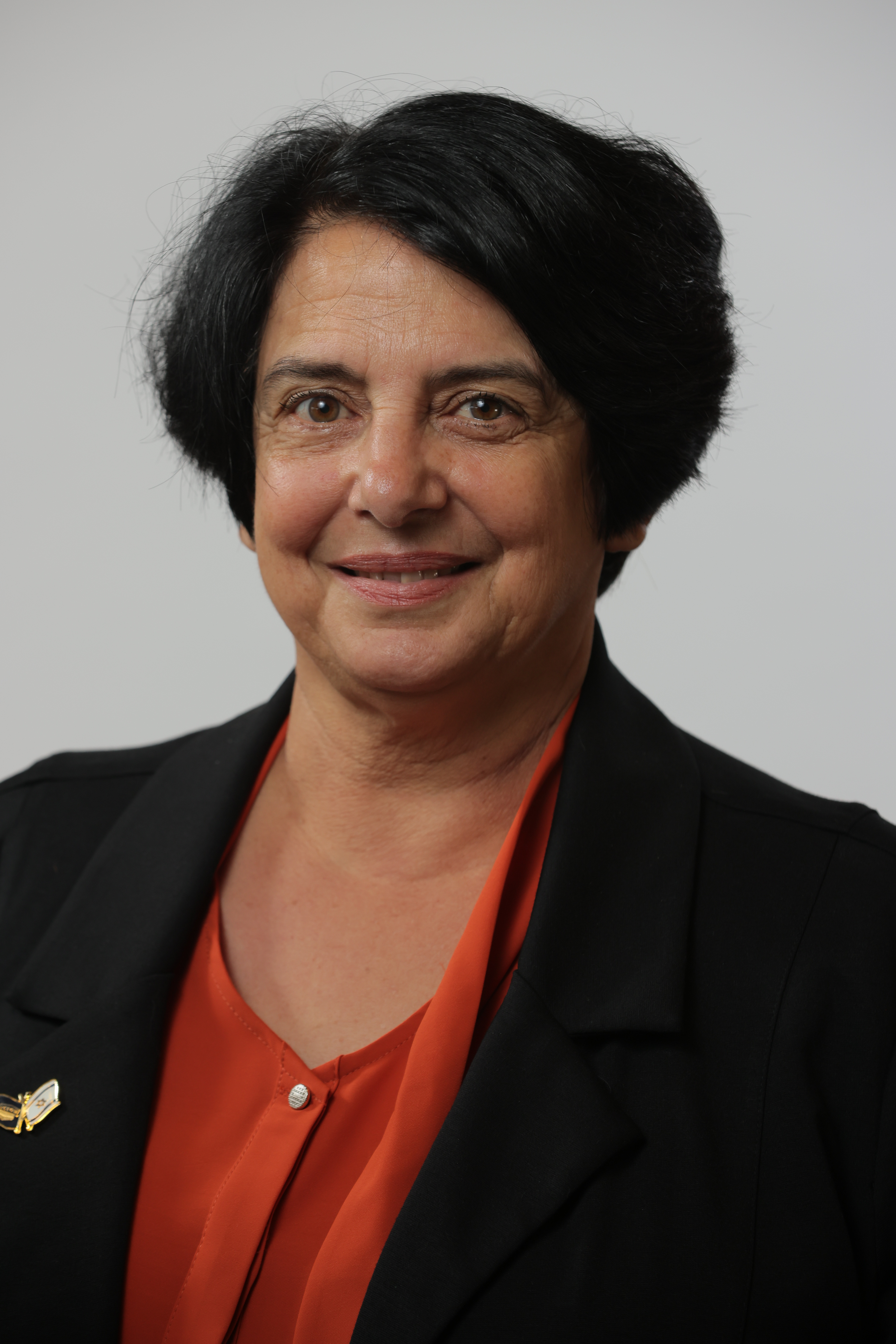
- Sarfati Harkavi in 2022

Faction represented in the Knesset
- 2022–2026: Yesh Atid

Personal details
- Born: 13 August 1962 (age 64) Kiryat Ata, Israel

Matti Sarfati Harkavi (Hebrew: מטי צרפתי הרכבי; born 13 August 1962) is an Israeli politician who served as a member of the Knesset for Yesh Atid from 2022 until 2026.

== Biography ==
Sarfati Harkavi earned a BSc and PhD from the Hebrew University of Jerusalem and worked as a plant geneticist at Hazera Genetics. She became mayor of Yoav Regional Council in 2011, and was re-elected unopposed in the 2018 municipal elections.

Prior to the 2022 Knesset elections Sarfati Harkavi was placed eighteenth on the Yesh Atid list. She was elected to the Knesset as the party won 24 seats.
