= Yoav Horesh =

Israeli photographer

Yoav Horesh (Hebrew: יואב הורש; born 1975, Jerusalem, Israel) is a contemporary Israeli photographer best known for his work in both black and white and color photography capturing images of conflict, human tragedy, memory, and recovery in Europe, Asia, and the Americas. He is currently Chair of Photography at the New Hampshire Institute of Art (NHIA) in Manchester, New Hampshire.

== Early life ==
Horesh obtained his Bachelor of Fine Arts (BFA) degree from the Massachusetts College of Art and Design and completed his Master of Fine Arts (MFA) degree at Columbia University in 2005.

Since then, Horesh has taught at numerous universities in the United States, Hong Kong, Europe, and Israel. Among these are the Massachusetts College of Art and Design, Emmanuel College, Queens College, Columbia University, and the New Hampshire Institute of Art. He also established and oversaw the Photography Department of the Savannah College of Art and Design’s nascent Hong Kong campus.

== Career ==
Horesh has said that his deep interest in the history of "sites" led him to explore locations far and wide in search of cultural clues and personal histories. To that end, his practice has evolved from traditional "street photography" to large format landscapes, interiors, and portraits that challenge the viewer to initiate a discussion between present and past events. His photographic projects have taken place in the American southwest, Germany, Laos, Israel, the Gaza Strip, and Cambodia.

Horesh has exhibited internationally in galleries and museums including in Germany, Italy, Israel, the United States, Russia, Hong Kong, and Myanmar. Solo and group exhibitions have included shows at the Palazzo Reale di Milano, Projekt RaumBahnhof 25 in Germany, and the Jerusalem National Theater. Recent exhibitions include the Israel Museum (2015), the Erarta Museum of Contemporary Art in Saint Petersburg (2016) and at the Ashdod Museum of Art (2016).

Horesh's work is included in numerous private and public collections including the Addison Gallery of American Art, Ashdod Museum of Art, and the Museum of New Art. His latest monograph Aftermath (2016) was published by SPQR Editions.
