= Sgula =

Moshav in southern Israel

Sgula: סגולה (Hebrew); سجولا (Arabic)
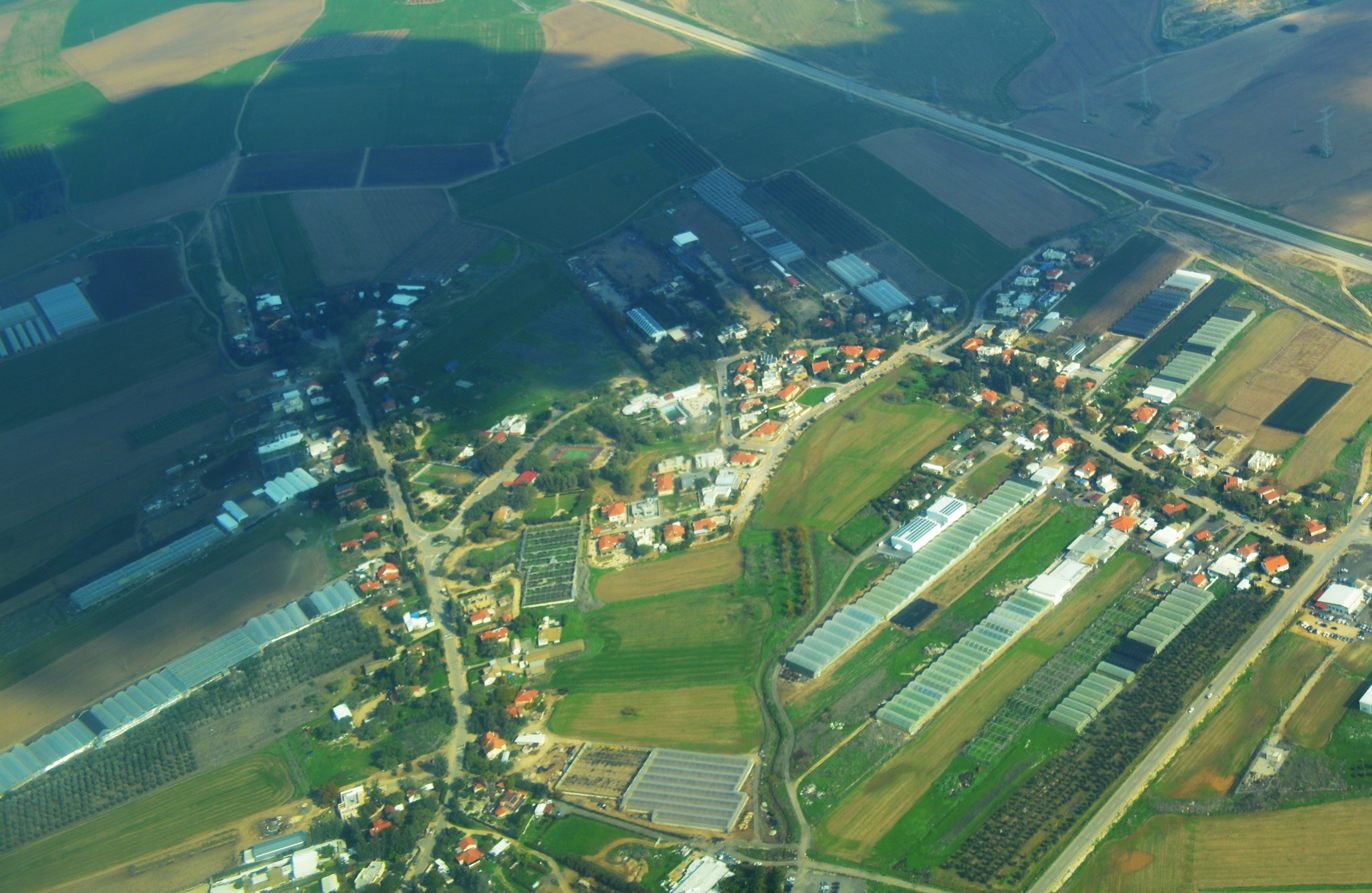

- Location within Ashkelon region of Israel
- Coordinates: 31°40′13″N 34°46′47″E
- Country: Israel
- District: Southern
- Subdistrict: Ashkelon
- Council: Yoav
- Affiliation: Kibbutz Movement
- Founded: 1953
- Founder: Sabras
- Population (2024): 647

Sgula (Hebrew: סְגֻלָּה, סגולה) is a moshav in south-central Israel. North of Kiryat Gat, it falls under the jurisdiction of Yoav Regional Council. In 2024, it had a population of 717.

== History ==
The moshav was founded in 1953 by native Israelis, on the land of the former Palestinian village of Summeil, which was depopulated in the 1948 Arab–Israeli War. The name may be based on a verse in Exodus (19:5) where the word segula is used in the sense of "special treasure" or jewel: "Now if you obey me fully and keep my covenant, then out of all nations you will be my special treasure (sgula)."
