= Sde Yoav =

Kibbutz in southcentral Israel

Sde Yoav: שדה יואב (Hebrew); سدي يوآف (Arabic)
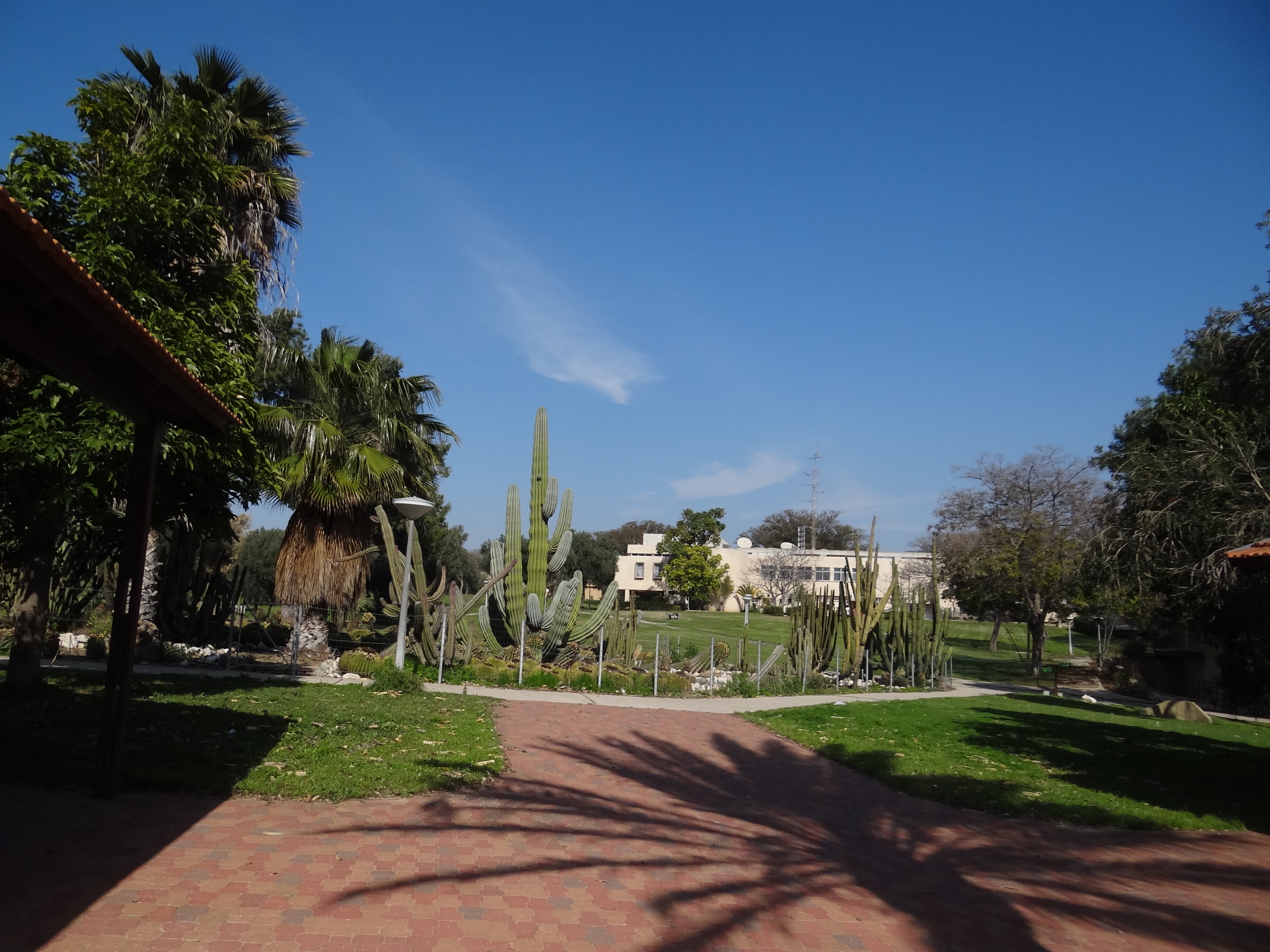

- Location within Ashkelon region of Israel
- Coordinates: 31°38′45″N 34°40′36″E
- Country: Israel
- District: Southern
- Subdistrict: Ashkelon
- Council: Yoav
- Affiliation: Kibbutz Movement
- Founded: 1956
- Founder: Hashomer Hatzairniks
- Population (2024): 640

Sde Yoav (Hebrew: שְׂדֵה יוֹאָב, lit. Yoav's Field) is a kibbutz in southcentral Israel. Located between the cities of Kiryat Gat, Kiryat Malakhi and Ashkelon, it falls under the jurisdiction of Yoav Regional Council. In 2024 it had a population of 640.

== History ==
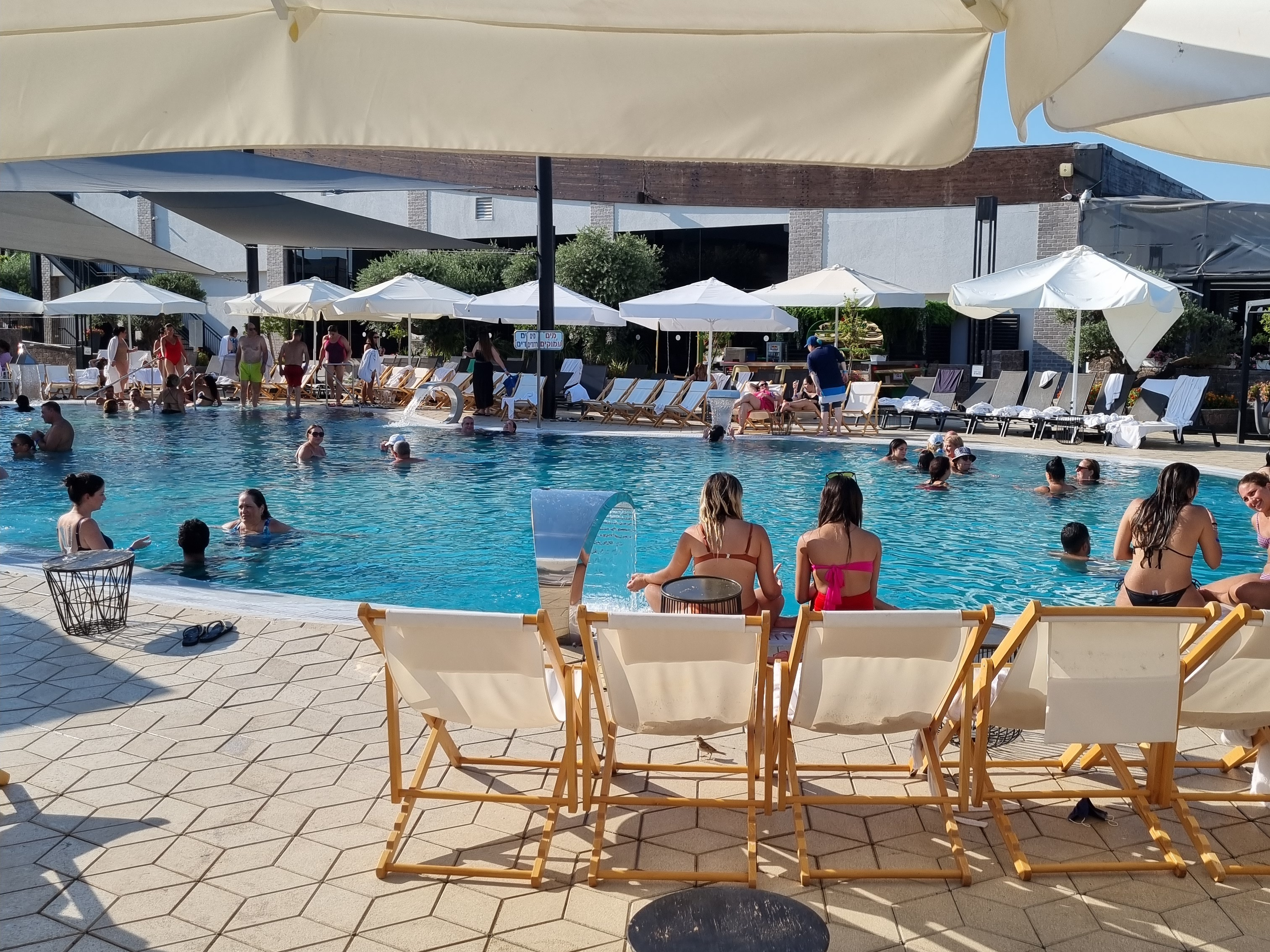
Hamei Yoav

Kibbutz Sde Yoav was established in 1966 by members of Hashomer Hatzair. It was founded on the former lands of the depopulated Palestinian village of Iraq Suwaydan. After drilling in the 1950s in the hopes of finding oil, the boreholes were covered for 30 years until developers realized their potential as a source of sulfur-rich mineral baths. In the 1980s, the kibbutz opened a spa, Hamei Yoav.

According to the Ashkelon district archaeologist of the Israel Antiquities Authority, a Byzantine winepress unearthed at Hamei Yoav, as well as three similar presses found nearby, were located along the ancient road from Beit Guvrin to the port in ancient Ashkelon. From here, it is believed the wine was exported to Europe and North Africa.
