= Nehusha =

Moshav in central Israel

Nehusha: נְחוּשָׁה (Hebrew)
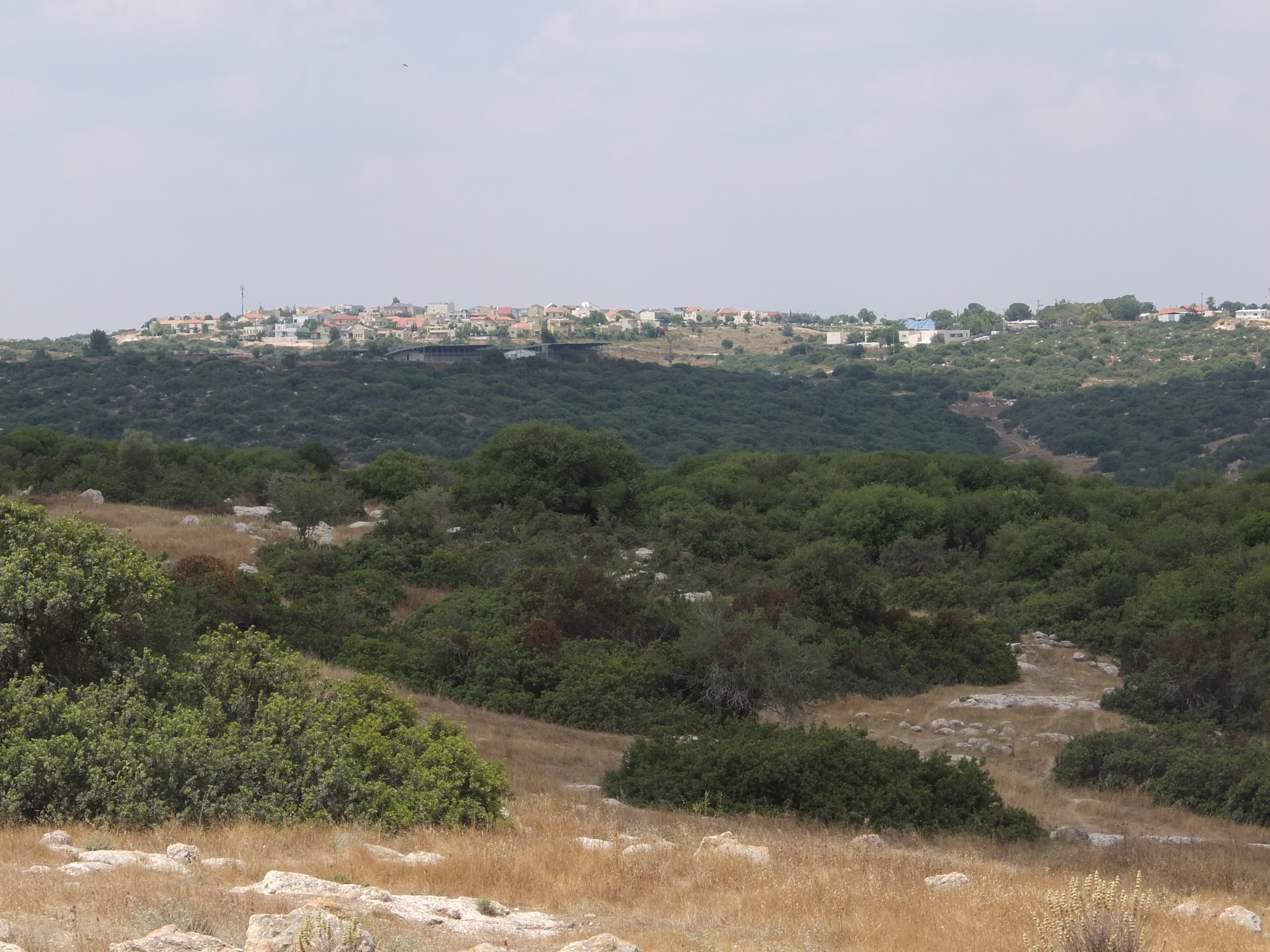
- Nehusha seen from the hill of Khirbat Umm Burj

- Location within Jerusalem District
- Coordinates: 31°37′43″N 34°57′8″E
- Country: Israel
- District: Jerusalem
- Council: Mateh Yehuda
- Affiliation: Hapoel HaMizrachi
- Founded: 1955
- Population (2024): 1,421
- Website: www.nechusha.org.il

Nehusha (Hebrew: נְחוּשָׁה, lit. 'Steadfast') is a moshav in central Israel. Located five kilometres north-east of Beit Guvrin, it falls under the jurisdiction of Mateh Yehuda Regional Council. In 2024 it had a population of 1,421.

== History ==
The moshav was established in 1955 on land that had previously belonged to the depopulated Palestinian village of Umm Burj before the 1948 Arab-Israeli War. Although the village collapsed in 1968, it was re-established in 1981. Its name is derived from the name of the Biblical town of Ir-Nachash (1 Chronicles 4:12) nearby and from Psalms 18:35 (where it is translated as brass, although its meaning is steadfast or firm);

Who traineth my hands for war, so that mine arms do bend a bow of brass.

== Archaeology ==
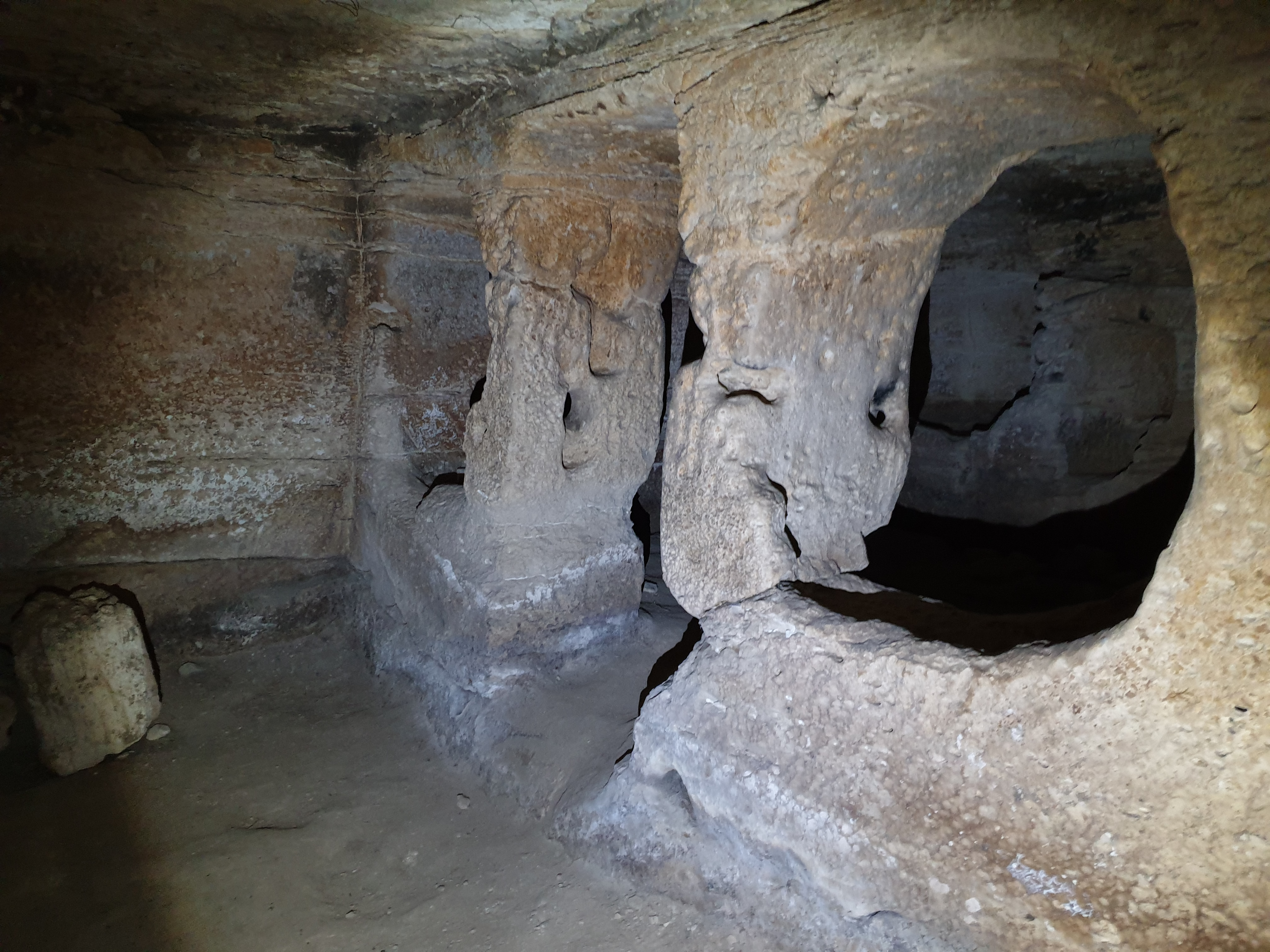
Underground stables

In 2004 an archaeological excavation was conducted at Nehusha by Rona Avissar on behalf of Bar Ilan University's Department of Land of Israel Studies and Archaeology.

The excavation revealed about 30 entrances to rock-cut caves, 10 bell shaped caves with plastered walls, rock-cut tombs with kokhim, columbarium, agricultural facilities later to become an underground hiding complex and a stable. Pottery fragments at the site dates back to the Hasmonean dynasty, Roman and Byzantine periods and very few from the medieval period.

== Gallery ==
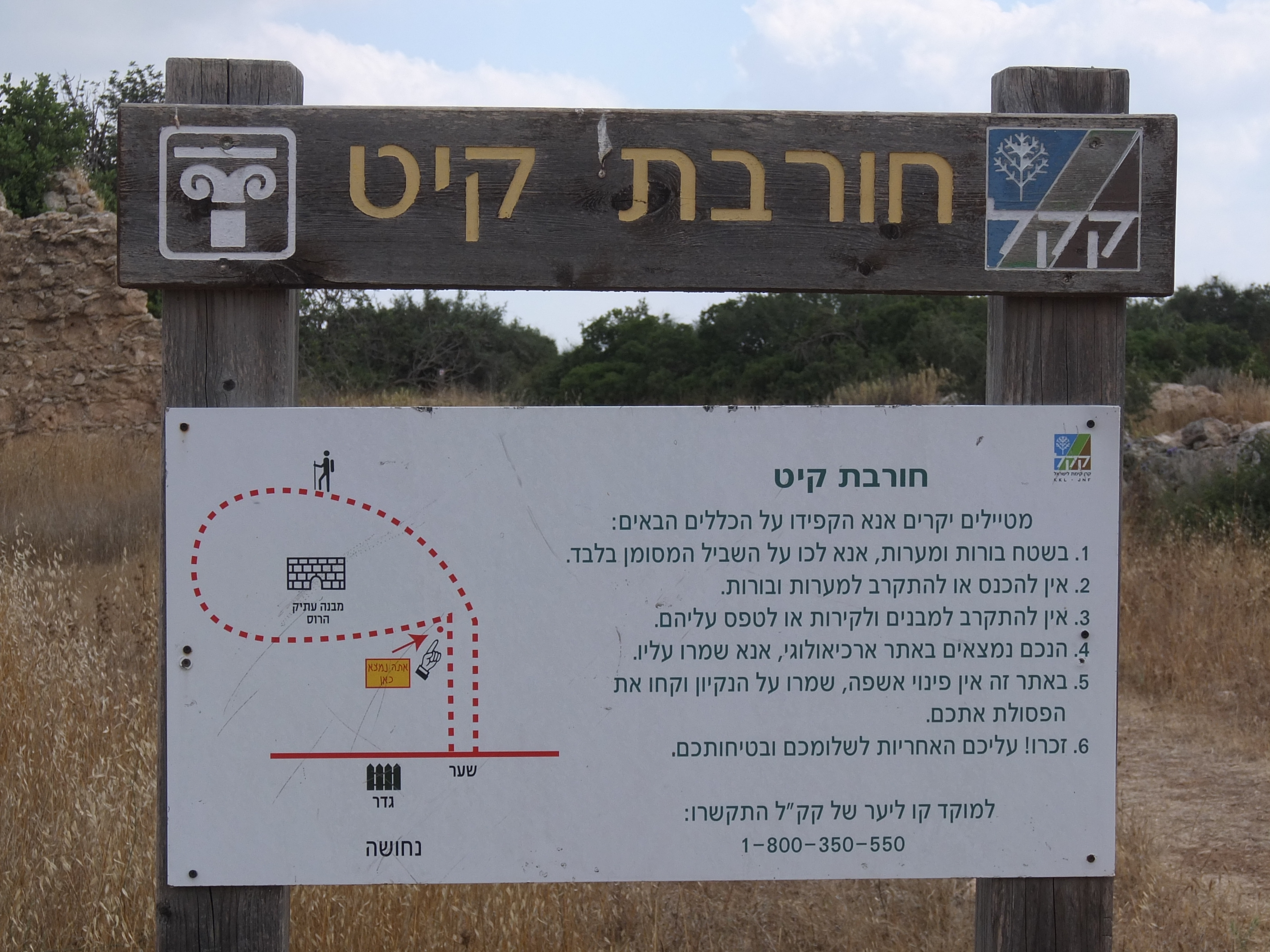
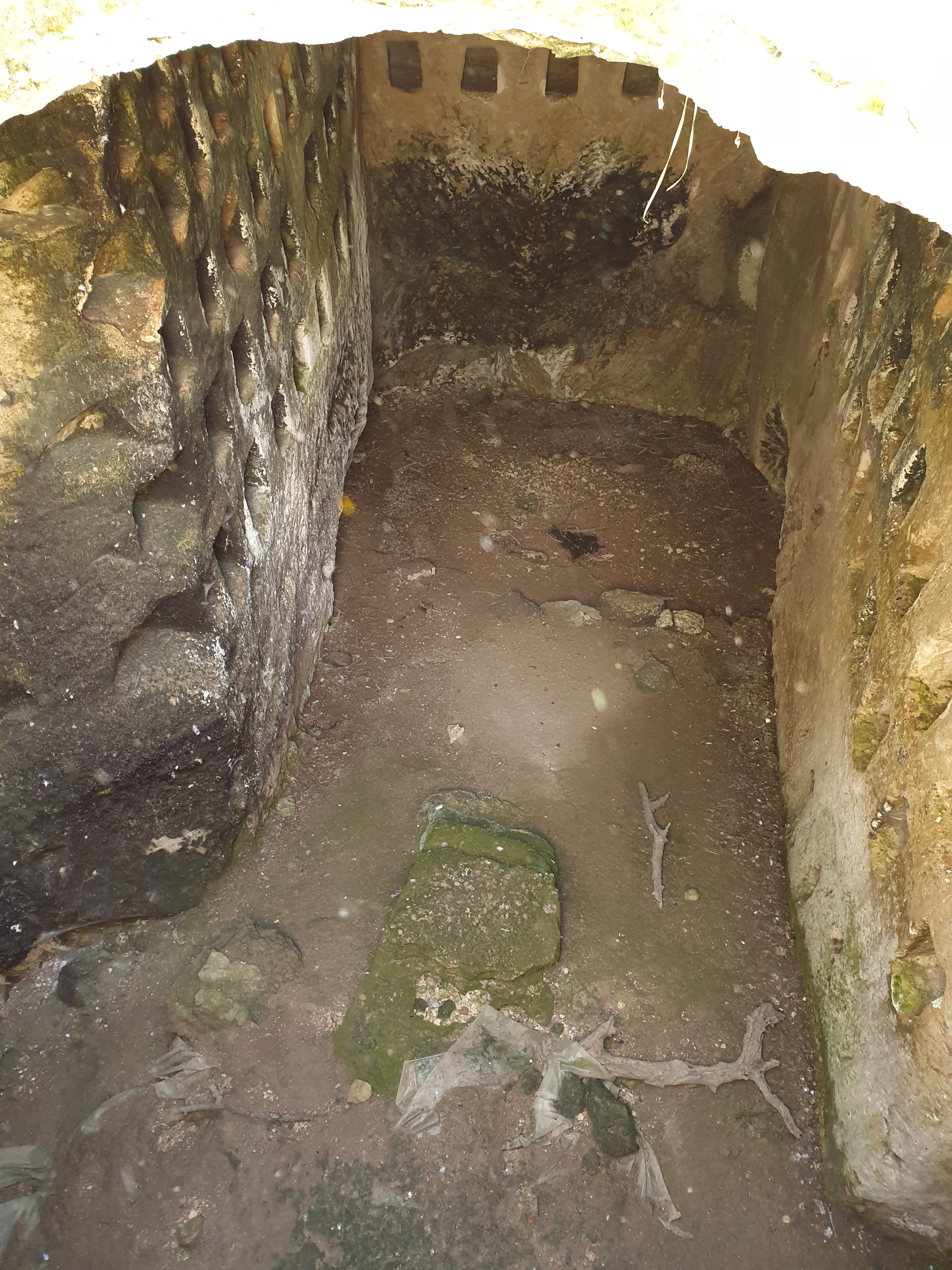
Cross shaped columbarium
Signpost showing description of ancient ruin, Hurvat Qayit

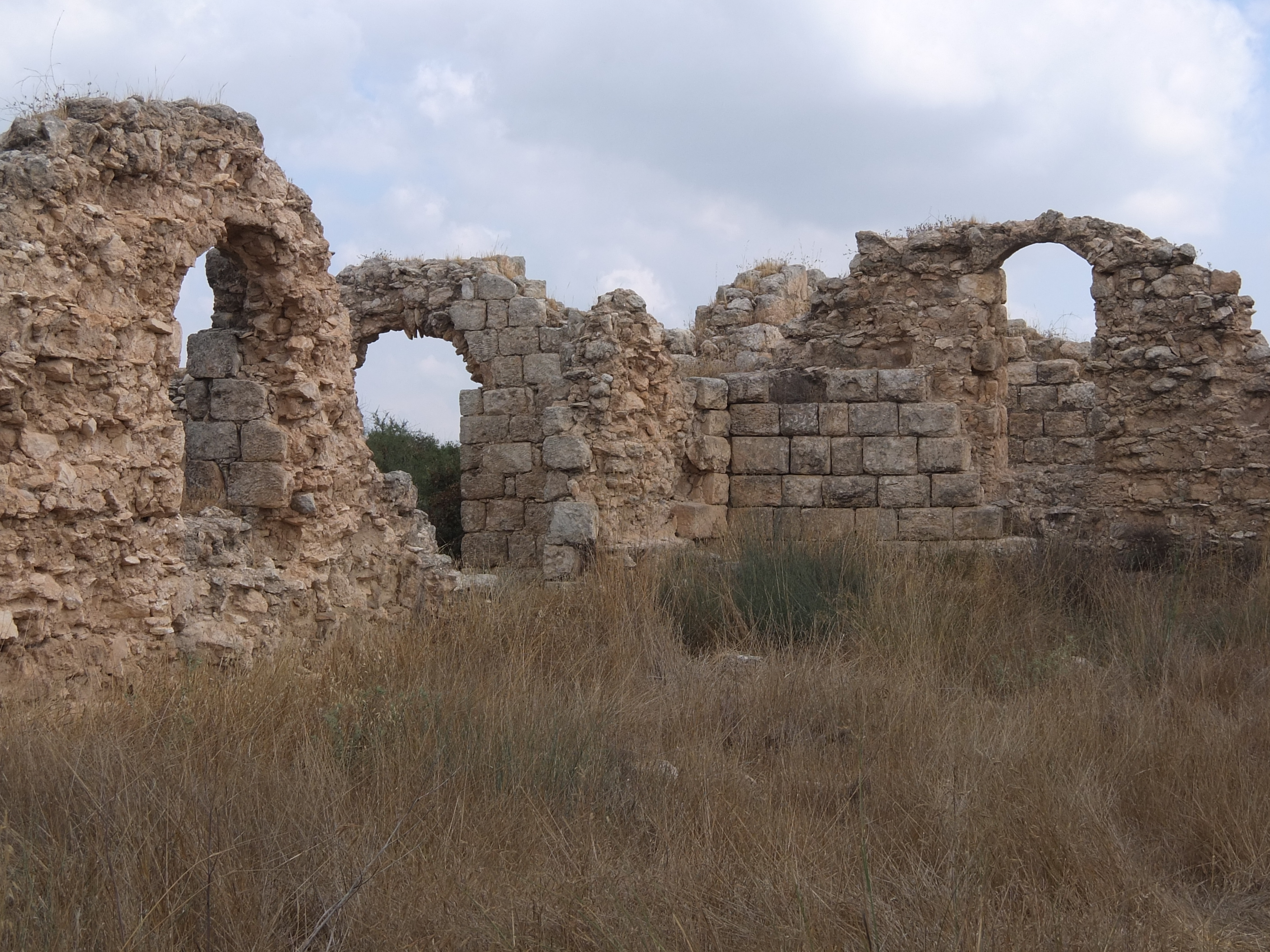
The ancient ruin of Qayit, near Nehusha

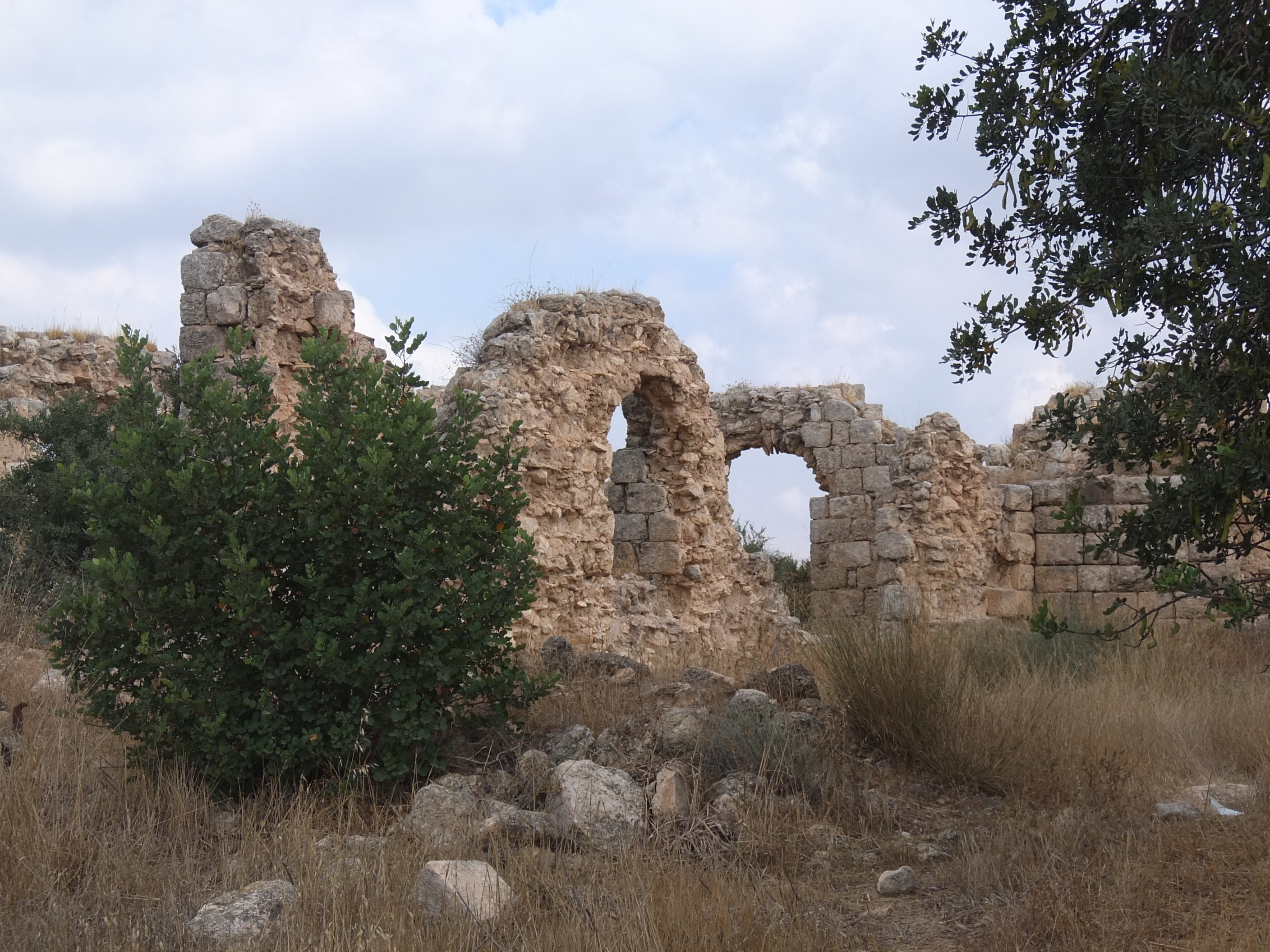
Ruin of Qayit near Moshav Nehusha

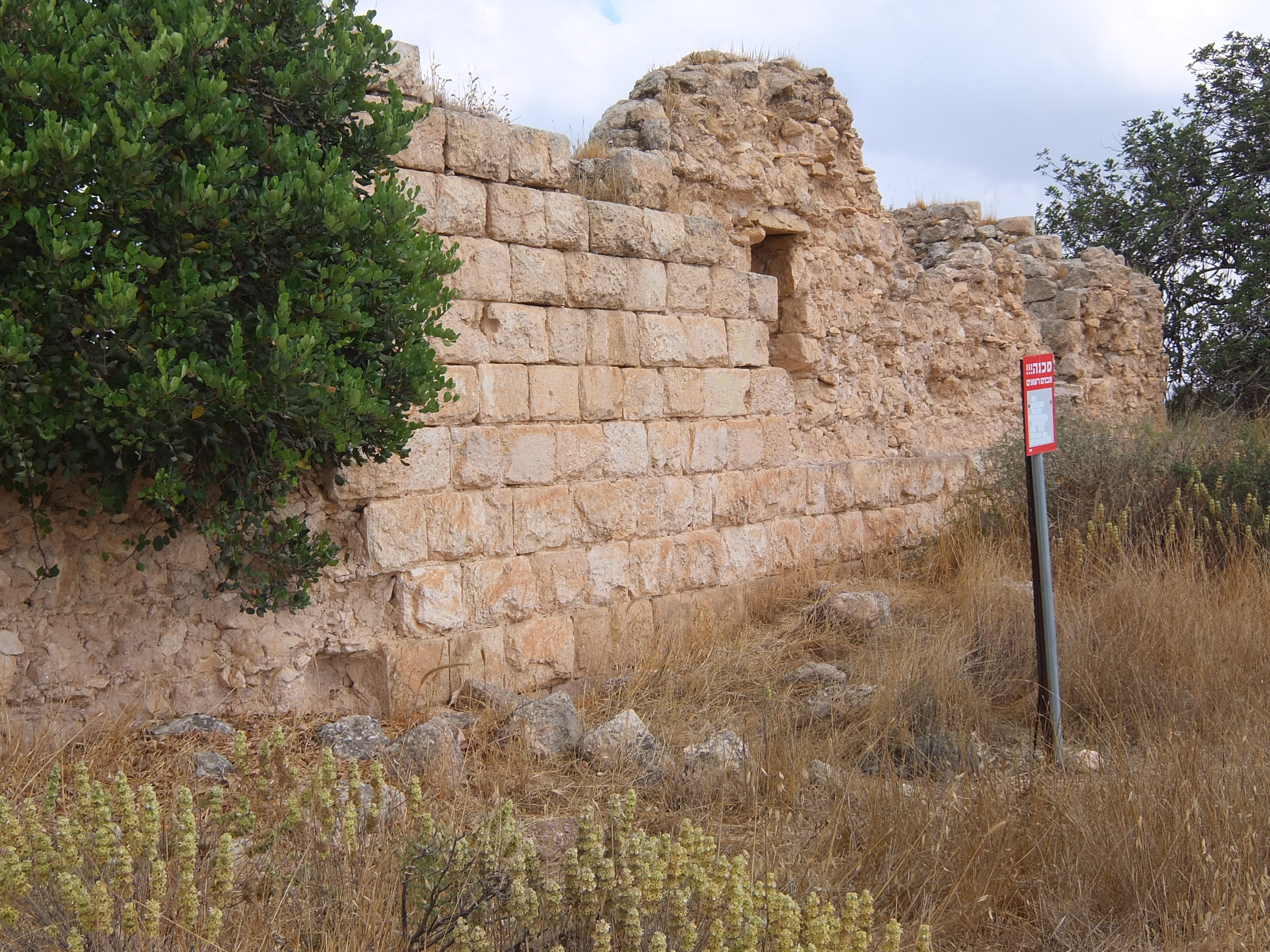
Ruin of Qayit near Nehusha

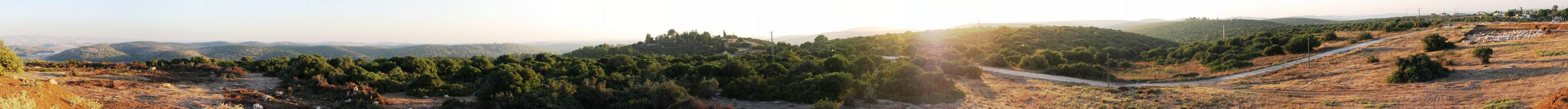
