= Sallis =

Sallis can refer to:

== People ==
- Charles Sallis (1934–2024), Mississippi educator, textbook editor
- Crispian Sallis (born 1959), British art director, son of Peter
- Hunter Sallis (born 2003), American basketball player
- James Sallis (1944–2026), American writer
- James F. Sallis, American psychologist and academic
- John Sallis (1938–2025), American philosopher
- Peter Sallis (1921–2017), English actor
- Susan Sallis (1929–2020), British novelist

== Fictional people ==
- Dr. Theodore "Ted" Sallis, the Man-Thing, a fictional character in Marvel Comics

== Places ==
- Sallis, Mississippi
- Sallis (ruin)
