= Erani =

Erani may refer to:

- Tel Erani, an archaeological site in Israel
- Erani Filiatra, a football club in Greece
