= Gat, Israel =

Kibbutz in southern Israel

Gat: גַּת (Hebrew); غات (Arabic)
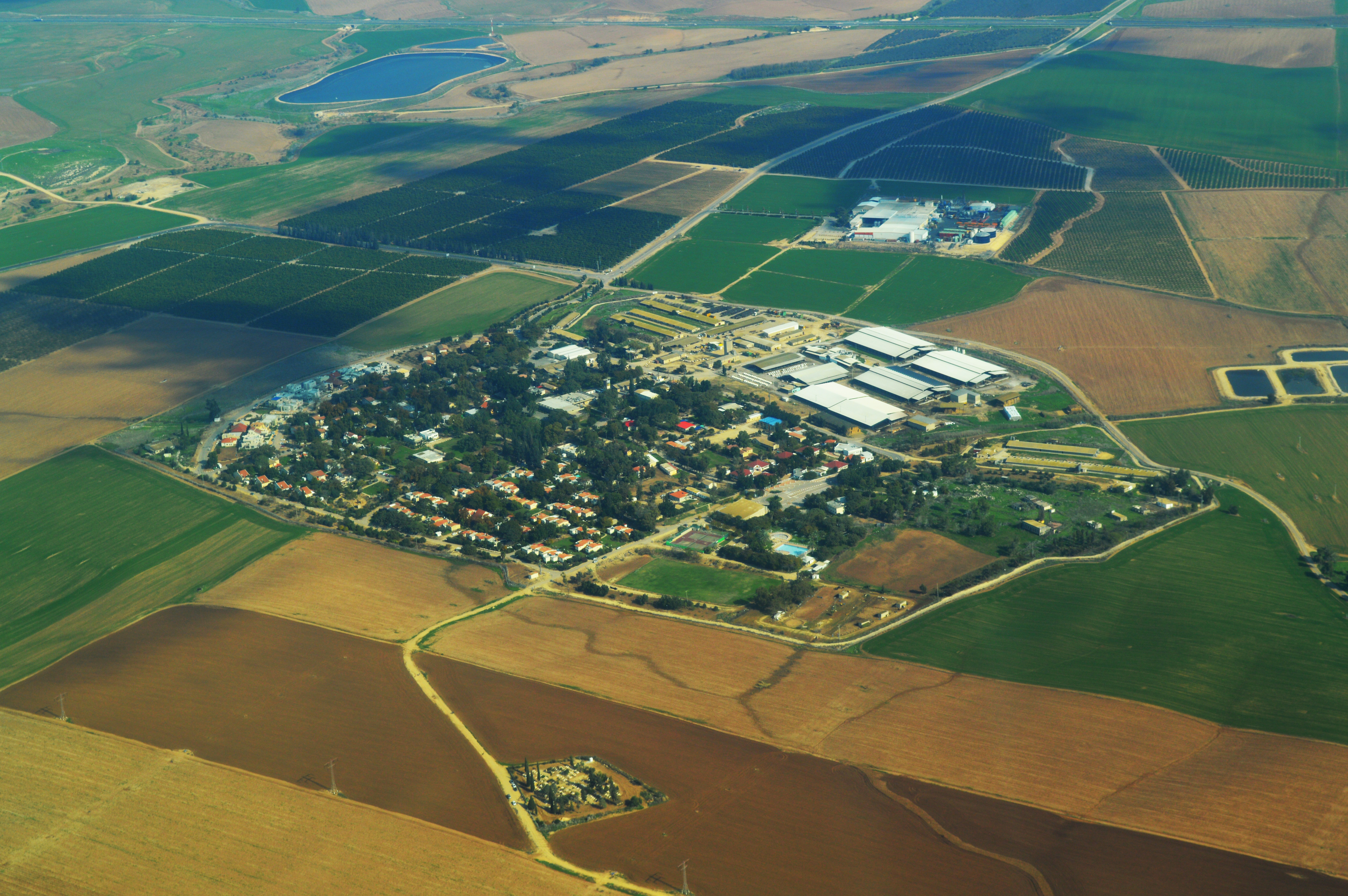

- Location within Ashkelon region of Israel Location within Israel
- Coordinates: 31°37′38″N 34°47′39″E
- Country: Israel
- District: Southern
- Subdistrict: Ashkelon
- Council: Yoav
- Affiliation: Kibbutz Movement
- Founded: 1941
- Founder: Polish, Yugoslav and Austrian Jews
- Population (2024): 946
- Website: www.gat.org.il

Gat (Hebrew: גַּת) is a kibbutz in southern Israel. Located near Kiryat Gat, it falls under the jurisdiction of Yoav Regional Council. In 2024 it had a population of 946.

== History ==
Kibbutz Gat was founded in 1941 by Jewish immigrants from Poland, Yugoslavia and Austria. In 1949, after the nearby Palestinian village of Iraq al-Manshiyya had been depopulated, some of the land was transferred to Kibbutz Gat. Primor, one of Israel's largest juice manufacturers, is operated by the kibbutz. Citramed, another company located in Kibbutz Gat, has developed a method to squeeze out the antibacterial properties in the rind of citrus fruit for use as a natural preservative in health products and the food industry.

The name is derived from the Philistine town Gath, which at the time the kibbutz was founded was identified with the nearby site of Tel Erani. The town of Kiryat Gat (lit. Gath City) was named for the same reason. However, most scholars now consider Tell es-Safi, thirteen kilometres to the northeast, a more likely candidate.

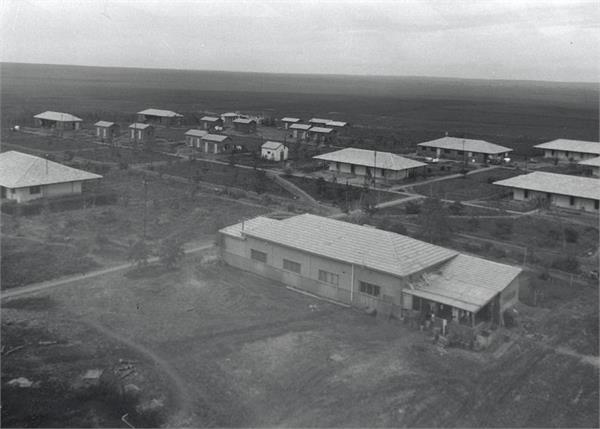
Gat 1945

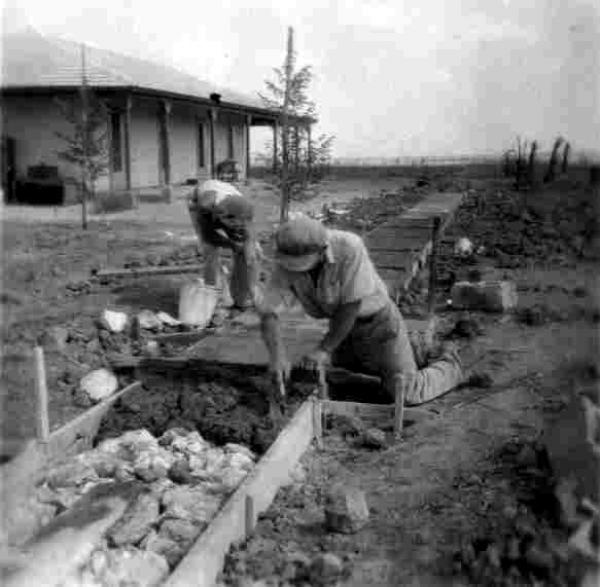
Building the kibbutz

== Notable people ==
- Yossi Dina
