= Aviram Dahari =

Israeli politician

- אבירם דהרי
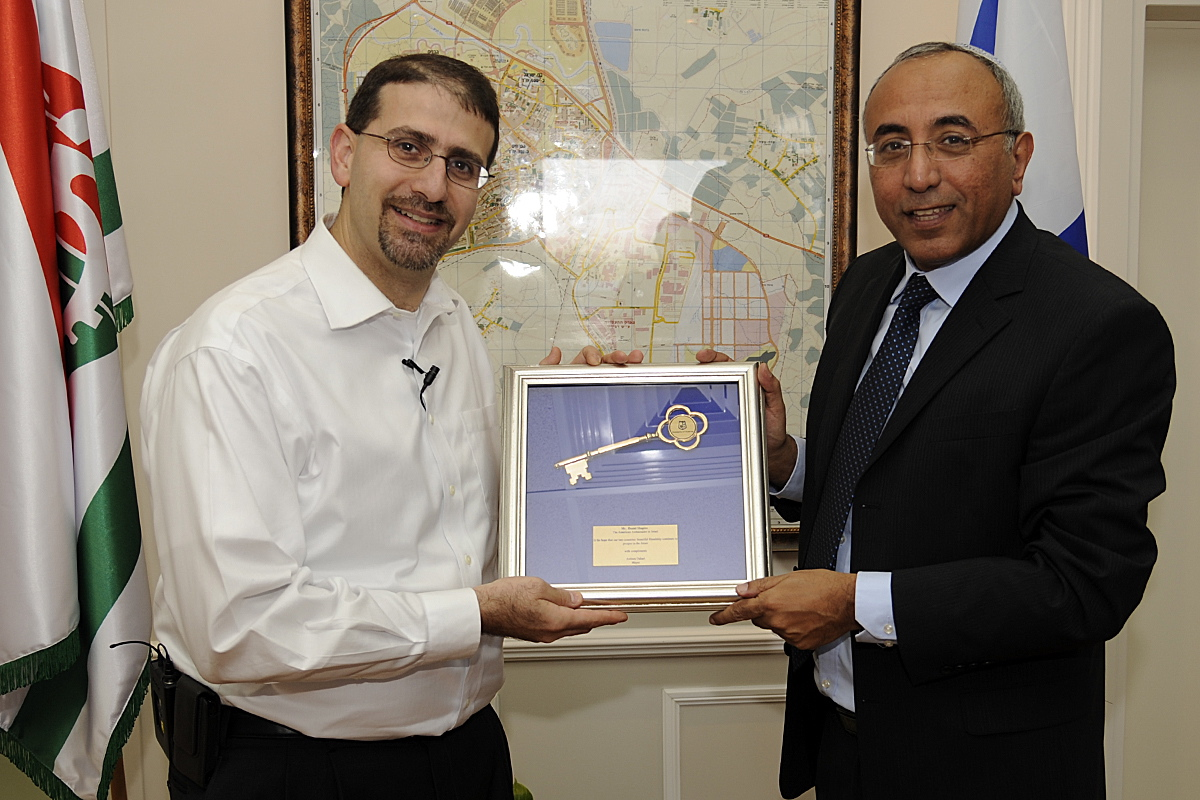

4th mayor of Kiryat Gat
- In office 2003–2024
- Preceded by: Albert Erez
- Succeeded by: Kfir Swisa

Personal details
- Born: 1963 (age 62–63)
- Party: Tadmit
- Spouse: Yael Dahari

Aviram Dahari (Hebrew: אבירם דהרי; born 1963) is an Israeli politician, mayor of the Israeli city of Kiryat Gat from 2003 to 2024.

== Biography ==
Dahari was born to a Yemenite-Jewish family. He is the father of five children. He is a software engineer with a master's degree in Industrial engineering from Ben-Gurion University of the Negev.

In the 2003 elections Dahari led the independent movement known as "Tadmit". In the first round he received 32% of the vote in contrast to the mayor at the time Albert Erez, who received 25%. In the second round, Dahari received about 70% of the vote and became the city's fifth mayor. Dahari was re-elected in the 2008 municipal elections, the 2013 municipal elections, and again in the 2018 municipal elections, each time winning over 50% of the vote in round 1.

Political offices
Preceded by Albert Erez	Mayor of Kiryat Gat; 2003-2024	Succeeded by Kfir Swisa
