= Kfir =

Kfir (כפיר) is a Hebrew given name meaning "lion cub". It may refer to:

== People ==
- Kfir Edri, Israeli footballer
- Kfir Golan, Israeli sprinter
- Kfir Swisa, Mayor of Kiryat Gat, Israel
- Kfir Tsafrir, Israeli singer
- Kfir Udi, Israeli footballer
- Kfir Zokol, Israeli footballer

== Other ==
- IAI Kfir, Israeli airplane
- Kfir Brigade of the IDF
- KFIR, radio station in Sweet Home, Oregon, USA
