= Kefar Shihlayim =

Jewish settlement in Judea destroyed in the First Jewish–Roman War

Kefar Shiḥlayim (Hebrew: כפר שחלים), also Kfar Shiḥlim, Kfar Shahliim and Kfar Shiḥlaya, a place name compounded of the word "Kefar" (village) plus a denominative, was a Jewish town in the Judean Lowlands during the Second Temple period. The town is mentioned several times in Rabbinic literature, viz., the Babylonian Talmud, the Jerusalem Talmud and in Midrash Rabba, and is thought to have been destroyed during the Bar Kokhba revolt, alongside the villages of Bish and Dikrin, although later resettled.

== Historical background ==
In circa 64 CE, when Cestius and his contingent of Roman soldiers were defeated by the people of Jerusalem, this greatly emboldened the war-like faction of Jerusalem who resolved to subdue also the inhabitants of the coastal town of Ascalon, a town inhabited by foreigners and which had a Roman garrison stationed there. The attack made by the advancing soldiers was thwarted by the Roman army and the town's defenders, which, after many of the town's assailants had fallen, those of the Jewish nation who retreated fled with their commander Niger of Perea to a town called Sallis in Idumaea, thought to be Shiḥlayim. There, the few who escaped, recuperated and enlisted other able-bodied men of their fellow countrymen to launch a second attack against Ascalon, but once again failed in their endeavor.

In the early 2nd century, a man from the village appeared before R. Tarfon. A settlement is mentioned by Eusebius from the beginning of the fourth century CE called Saaleim (Greek: Σααλειμ), which he places seven Roman miles (ca. 10 km.) west of Eleutheropolis (Beit Guvrin).

Medieval geographer Yāqūt al-Ḥamawi (Muʿğam 3:46, 49) mentioned "in the territory of ʿAsqelân" a contemporary settlement called Siḥlīn (Arabic: سحْلين). A locality by this name is also mentioned in a Crusader letter dated 1136 CE. The last clue to the name preservation is the name of the settlement of Menshiyet es-Saḥalin, documented in the Ottoman Census of 1596, which probably refers to the former town Iraq al-Manshiyya in present-day Kiryat Gat.

== Talmudic references ==
The Babylonian Talmud (redacted in 500 CE) refers to three cities with populations greater than those who departed Egypt, thought to be hyperbolic speech:

Rabbi Assi said King Alexander Jannaeus (Yannai) had six-hundred thousand townships on the King's Mountain and each one having the equivalent in numbers of those departing Egypt, except three which had double the number of those departing Egypt: Kefar Bish, Kefar Shiḥlayim, and Kefar Dikraya. Kefar Bish (lit. "Evil Village") was so-called because they would not give lodging to strangers. Kefar Shiḥlayim (lit. "Garden Cress Village") was so-called because they made their living by cultivating garden cress. As for Kefar Dikraya (lit. "Village of Males"), Rabbi Yochanan said that it was so-called because the women of the village were prolific in giving birth to male children first, and, afterwards, females.

The account in the Jerusalem Talmud, likewise, mentions a population double that of the Israelites who left Egypt, a characteristically exaggerated number in the Talmud, but also differs slightly:

There were three villages, each one having a population twice the number of the Israelites who departed Egypt: Kefar Bish, Kefar Shiḥlaya, and Kefar Dikraya. Why is it that they call it Kefar Bish? It is because they would not show hospitality to wayfarers. And why is it that they call it Kefar Shiḥlaya? It is because they were prolific in their child-bearing, just as those [who cultivate] garden-cress. And why is it that they call it Dikraya? It is because all of their women would give birth to male children. Unless one of them went out from there, they could not give birth to a female.

== Etymology ==
The origin of the name of the settlement Kefar Shiḥlayim is explained in the Jerusalem Talmud as being because they were prolific in child-bearing, just as garden-cress (Aramaic: taḥlūsiya) grows profusely when cultivated. The Aramaic word is equivalent to the Mishnaic Hebrew word for the same, being shiḥlayim. In the Babylonian Talmud the name of the settlement is attributed to the fact that the inhabitants of that place subsisted on the traffic of cress. The explanations given for these sites are thought to be merely a play on the Hebrew words שחלים, ביש, and דכרין, and not historically authentic. When these traditions were narrated in the 3rd-century CE, these places were thought to already be in ruins.

Linguists have pointed out that the Greek language cannot convey the guttural sound of the Hebrew letter ḥet (ח) and, which in the case of the name שחלים, the medial ח with a vowel, when it represents a laryngeal rather than a velar, is variously rendered: by a single or double vowel or by omission of the sign, such as מחלי (Exod. 6:19) -- (Greek: Μοολι); נחליאל (Num. 21:19) -- (Greek: Νααλιἠλ). The same rendering is had when transliterating the Hebrew Shihlayim into Greek, and which in English has been rendered as Sallis (Greek: Χάαλλις / Σάλλις) in Josephus' The Jewish War (3.2.2.), and Saaleim (Greek: Σααλειμ) in Eusebius' Onomasticon (160:9–10). Israeli historical geography, Yoel Elitzur, noting the same phonetic factors, wrote that place names bearing the Hebrew glottal consonants /h/ are not known in surviving names from the Onomasticon. Hebrew names such as Pella = פחל and Sallis (Saaleim) = שחלים are always transcribed by Greek writers in a geminative form, rather than in a guttural.

Thomsen and Nestle conclude that the Sallis mentioned by Josephus is identical with the Saaleim of Eusebius. Similarly, Schlatter identifies Kefar Shiḥlayim of the Talmud with Sallis of Josephus. Neubauer, throwing further light on the subject, suggests that the identification of Kefar Shiḥlayim, found in the Talmud and midrashic literature, be recognized in the name Shilḥim of the Bible (Joshua 15:32).

According to others, the Palestinian toponym Sihlin represents a complex linguistic tradition, characteristic of other place-names in Idumea and which toponymy show by their evolution a Judaean Hebrew substratum, followed by an Arabo-Edomite superstratum presumably not devoid of an Aramaic adstratum.

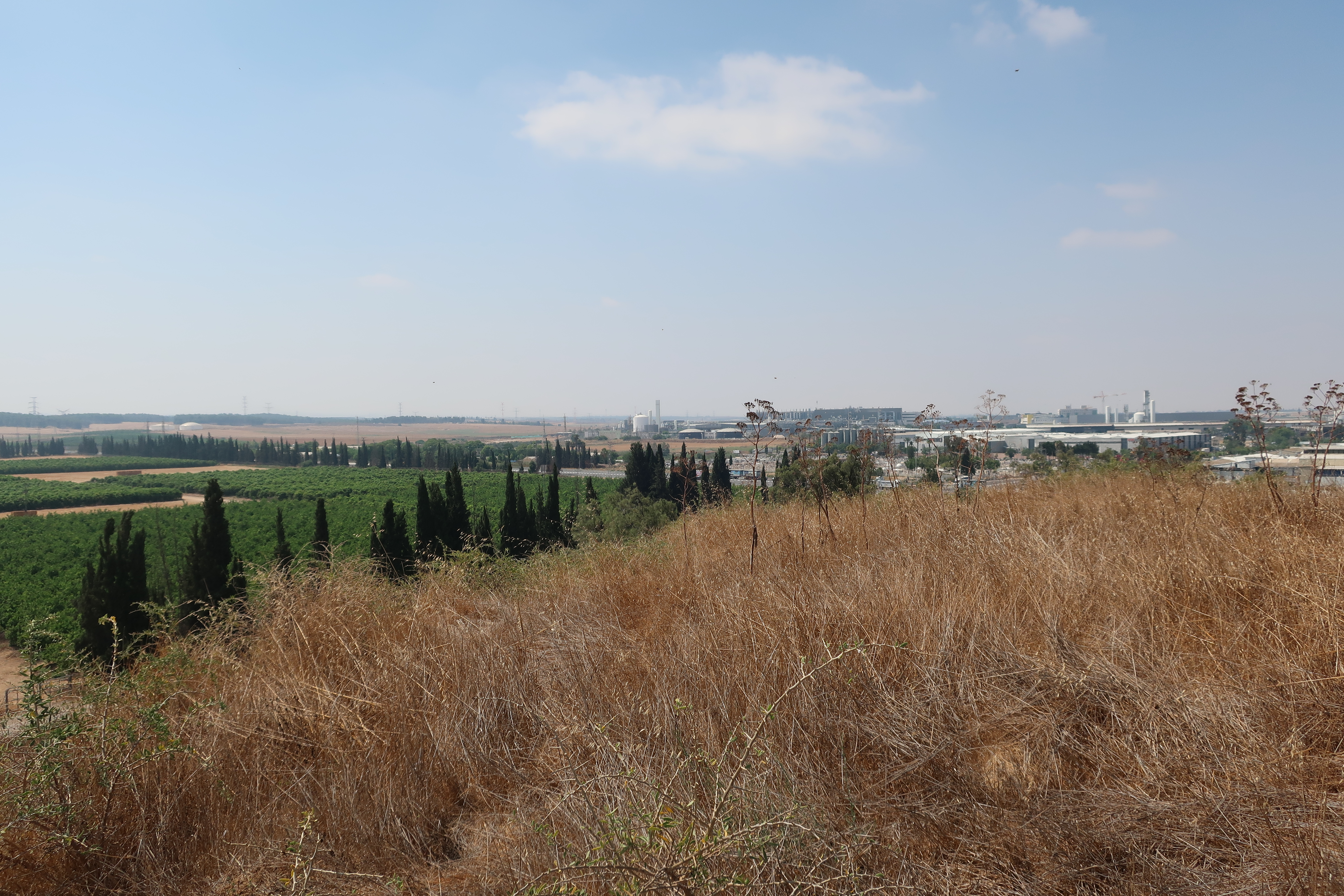
View from Tel Erani, outside of Kiryat Gat

== Identification ==
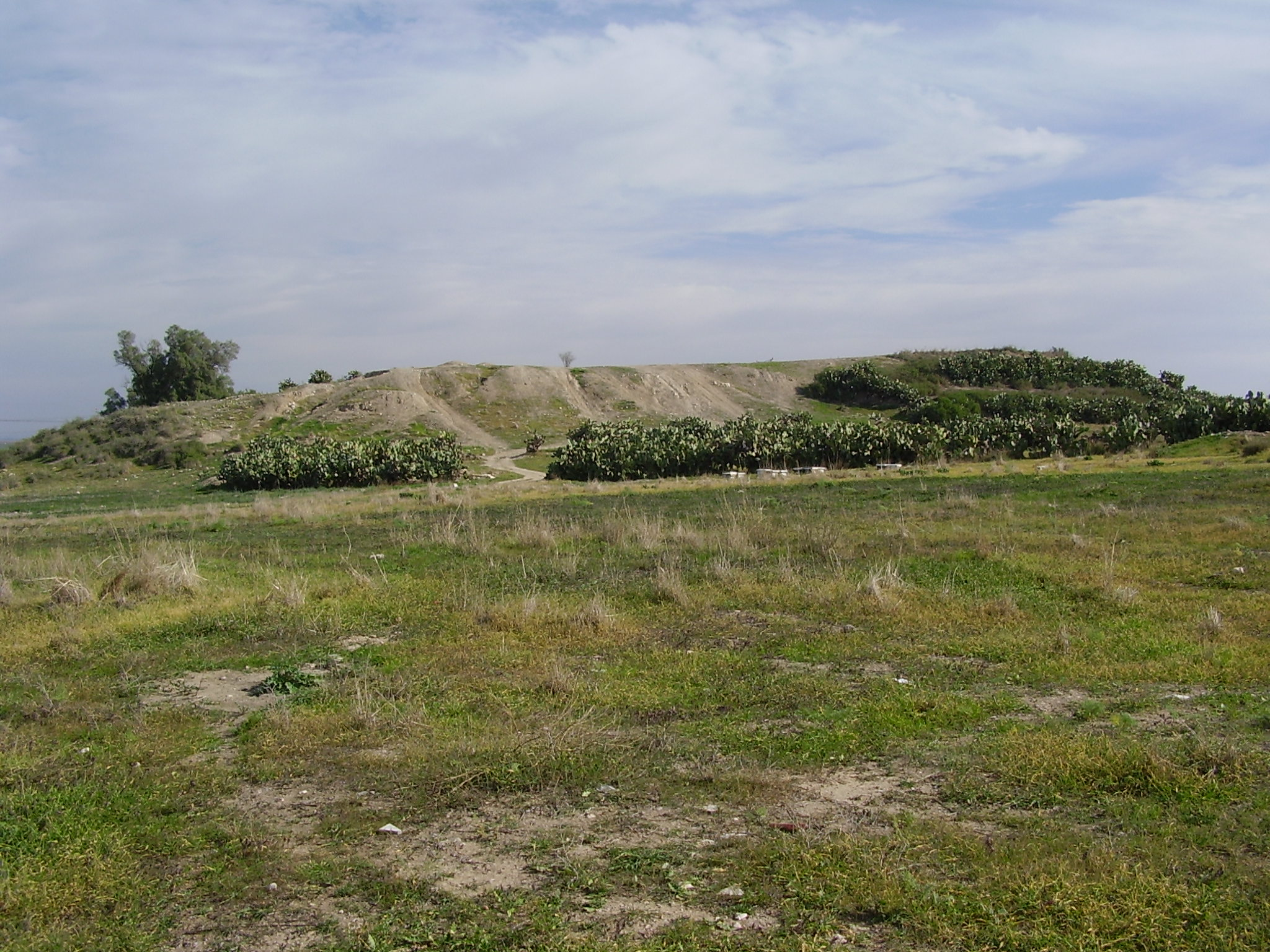
Ruin Tel 'Erani (Tell esh-Sheikh el-ʽAreini)

Several sites have been proposed for the ancient Kefar Shiḥlayim. Josephus places Sallis (Chaallis) in Idumaea, a geographical region of ancient Palestine directly south-southwest of Jerusalem. Eusebius, in his Onomasticon, places Saaleim (Kefar Shihlayim ?) "west of Eleutheropolis".

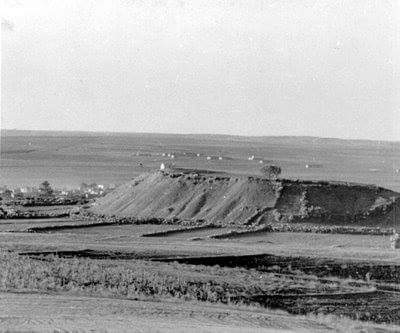
Photo showing Tel Erani and village Iraq al-Manshiyya - 1940

=== Iraq al-Manshiyya ===
(31.608333°N 34.783056°E)

Kefar Shiḥlayim has been tentatively identified with the Arab village of Iraq al-Manshiyya ("Cliffs of the place of growth"), 35 kilometres (22 mi) north-east of Gaza, where is now built the Israeli town of Kiryat Gat. The chief proponents of this theory being historical geographers Peter Thomsen, Samuel Klein and Paul Romanoff. Samuel Klein went so far as to note that in extant Greek texts of Josephus' The Jewish War (3.2.2.) there are found two versions of the Greek transliterated name "Sallis," the one being Greek: Χάαλλις = Chaallis, and the other being Greek: Σάλλις = Sallis. Klein then conflates the two renditions of the same place-name to come up with Greek: Χα[φαρ] Σαλλις = Kefar Shiḥlayim, and which Klein says was called by Eusebius and other Arab authors by the name Saḥalin. Yoel Elitzur followed in Klein's footsteps, proposing the same location for the village, based on the similar Arabic name preserved in the 1596 Ottoman tax registers.

Other researchers have concluded that the strongest argument in favor of the priority of the Iraq al-Manshiyya site for Kefar Shihlayim is the preservation of the site's old name in the 1596 Ottoman tax registers, where the name is mentioned as Arabic: منشية السحلين (Menšīyet es-Saḥalīn). According to Press, the adjacent Tell known as Tel ʽErani (Tell esh-Sheikh el-ʽAreini) bore the old name of ʽIraq el-Menšiye during the Mamluk and Ottoman period, a name that was only later applied to the Arab village at the foot of the Tell.

=== Khirbet Shaḥleh ===
Yeshayahu Press, chief editor of Topographical-Historical Encyclopedia of the Land of Israel, proposed that the town Kefar Shiḥlayim lay within the confines of the ruin Khirbet Shaḥleh (Kh. Šaḥleh), now Ḥórvat Šēlaḥ, a ruin located almost 2 statute miles to the east of Iraq al-Manshiyya, and called Khŭrbet Shalkhah (grid position 131113 PAL) in the British Survey of Western Palestine map (III, 285). F.M. Abel and Israeli archaeologist, Avi-Yonah, mention this site under the name Šalḫa. A.F. Rainey and Israeli archaeologist Yoram Tsafrir are major proponents of this theory.

=== Sahlim ===
Klein, without knowledge of the 1596 Ottoman tax registry, proposed a secondary site for Kefar Shiḥlayim as being "Sahlim near Ascalon," an indefinite site, but as a possible alternative to Iraq al-Manshiyya. Klein's view seems to be purely based on the assumption that "Sahlim near Ascalon" was a place other than Iraq al-Manshiyya.

=== Tell esh-Sheri'ah ===
German historical geography Georg Kampffmeyer proposed that Sharuhen found in Joshua 19:6 (a site rarely discussed by scholars of topography) be recognised in the name Tell esh-Sheri'ah, a ruin situated ca. 19.3 kilometres (12.0 mi) north-west of Beersheba. Albright, dissenting, thought that the same site was realized in Tell el-Huweilfeh, a ruin east of Dahiriyeh, or else in Tell el-Fârʿah, west of Beersheba. On the assumption that Shilḥim is a corruption of the name Sharuhen, as proposed by historical geographers, and that Shilḥim was the site of Kefar Shiḥlayim, this would point to a different locale. Kampffmeyer's view, however, is highly unlikely, as it is to assume that the old appellation was changed in the interim and returned to a phonetic-sound nearest its earliest phonetic-sound.

=== Further reading ===
- al-Ḥilou, Abdoullah 1986. Topographische Namen des syro-palästinische Raumes nach arabischen Geographen. Historische und etymologische Untersuchungen [Topographical names of the Syro-Palestinian region according to Arabic geographers. Historical and etymological studies], PhD thesis, Freie Universität Berlin, pp. 201–ff., s.v. Saḥlin (German)

== See also ==
- Tel Erani

== Bibliography ==
- Abel, F.M. (1938). Géographie de la Palestine (in French). Vol. 2. Paris. OCLC 216266367.
- Aharoni, Y. (1956). "The Land of Gerar". Israel Exploration Journal. 6 (1). Jerusalem: Israel Exploration Society: 26–32. JSTOR 27924640.
- Amar, Z. (2015). Flora and Fauna in Maimonides' Teachings (in Hebrew). Kfar Darom. OCLC 783455868.
- Avi-Yonah, M. (1949). Historical Geography of Palestine [גאוגרפיה היסטורית של ארץ ישראל] (in Hebrew). Jerusalem: Bialik Institute. OCLC 232935225.
- Avi-Yonah, M. (1976). "Gazetteer of Roman Palestine". Qedem. 5. The Institute of Archaeology at the Hebrew University of Jerusalem; Carta: 3–112. JSTOR 43587090.
- Benvenisti, Meron [in Hebrew]; Lepinsky, Nadav [in Hebrew] (n.d.). "Beit Gubrin". In Ben-Yosef, Sefi (ed.). Israel Guide - Judaea (A useful encyclopedia for the knowledge of the country) (in Hebrew). Vol. 9. Jerusalem: Keter Publishing House, in affiliation with the Israel Ministry of Defence. OCLC 745203905., s.v. בית גוברין
- Chapmann, R. L. III; Taylor, J. E., eds. (2003). Palestine in the Fourth Century A.D.: The Onomasticon by Eusebius of Caesarea. Translated by G.S.P. Freeman-Grenville. Jerusalem: Carta. ISBN 965-220-500-1. OCLC 937002750.
- Elitzur, Yoel (2004). Ancient Place Names in the Holy Land: Preservation and History. Translated by David Louvish. Jerusalem; Winona Lake, Indiana: Hebrew University: Magnes Press; Eisenbrauns. ISBN 157506071X. OCLC 492632049.
- Elitzur, Yoel (2012). Shemot meḳomot ḳedumim be-erets Yiśraʼel : hishtamrutam ṿe-gilgulehem [Ancient toponyms in the Land of Israel: preservation and history] (in Hebrew). Jerusalem: Hebrew Language Academy: Ben-Zvi Institute. OCLC 804476794.
- Hütteroth, Wolf-Dieter; Abdulfattah, Kamal (1977). Historical Geography of Palestine, Transjordan and Southern Syria in the Late 16th Century. Erlangen. ISBN 3-920405-41-2. OCLC 925530259.
- Jardine, R.F.; McArthur Davies, B.A. (1948). A Gazetteer of the Place Names which appear in the small-scale Maps of Palestine and Trans-Jordan. Jerusalem: Government of Palestine. OCLC 610327173.
- Josephus, The Jewish War (with an English translation by H. St. J. Thackeray), Loeb Classical Library
- Kampffmeyer, G. [in German] (1892). Alte Namen im heutigen Palästina und Syrien (in German). Vol. 1. Leipzig: Breitkopf & Härtel. OCLC 786490264.
- Klein, S. (1933). The Twenty-four City Councils (Voulí) in Judea [ארבע ועשרים בולאות שביהודה]. Vienna.
- Krašovec, Jože (2009). Rofé, A.; Segal, M.; Talmon, S.; Talshir, Z. (eds.). "Phonetic Factors in Transliteration of Biblical Proper Names into Greek and Latin". Textus - Studies of the Hebrew University Bible Project. 24. The Hebrew University, Magnes Press. OCLC 761216587.
- Löw, I. (1924). Die Flora der Juden (in German). Vol. 1. Vienna: R. Loewit.
- Neubauer, A. (1868). La Géographie du Talmud (in French). Paris: Michel Lévy Fréres. OCLC 474727878.
- Palmer, E.H. (1881). The Survey of Western Palestine: Arabic and English Name Lists Collected During the Survey by Lieutenants Conder and Kitchener, R. E. Transliterated and Explained by E.H. Palmer. Committee of the Palestine Exploration Fund.
- Press, Y., ed. (1952), "שחליים", A Topographical-Historical Encyclopaedia of Palestine, vol. 3, Jerusalem: Rubin Mass
- Press, Michael D. (2014). "The Arabic Names of Tẹ̄l ʿẸ̄rānī and ʿIrāq el-Menšīye". Zeitschrift des Deutschen Palästina-Vereins. 130 (2). Deutscher verein zur Erforschung Palästinas: 181–193. JSTOR 43664932.
- Röhricht, R. (1960). Regésta Regni Hierosolymitani 1097-1291. New York: B. Franklin. OCLC 84546631.
- Rainey, A.F. (1983). "The Biblical Shephelah of Judah". Bulletin of the American Schools of Oriental Research. 251 (251). The University of Chicago Press on behalf of The American Schools of Oriental Research: 1–22. doi:10.2307/1356823. JSTOR 1356823. S2CID 163604987.
- Romanoff, Paul (1937). Onomasticon of Palestine - A New Method in Post-Biblical Topography. New York: Jewish Theological Seminary of America. OCLC 610358974. (Reprinted from the Proceedings of the American Academy for Jewish Research, vol. VII)
- Schlatter, A. (1897). Die Tage Trajans und Hadrians. Beiträge zur Förderung christlicher Theologie, 1.3. (in German). Gütersloh: C. Bertelsmann. OCLC 744562351.
- Tsafrir, Y.; Di Segni, Leah; Green, Judith (1994). (TIR): Tabula Imperii Romani. Iudaea, Palestina: Eretz Israel in the Hellenistic, Roman and Byzantine Periods; Maps and Gazetteer. Jerusalem: Israel Academy of Sciences and Humanities. ISBN 965-208-107-8.
- Zadok, Ran (1995–1997). "A Preliminary Analysis of Ancient Survivals in Modern Palestinian Toponymy". Mediterranean Language Review. 9. Harrassowitz Verlag: 93–171. JSTOR 10.13173/medilangrevi.9.1997.0093.
