= Ronit Barash =

Israeli Jewish rebbetzin and preacher (born 1977)

Rebbetzin Ronit Barash
- רונית ברש
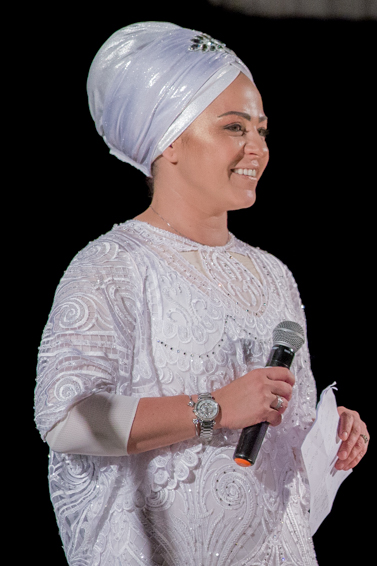
- Barash in 2016

Personal life
- Born: 7 June 1977 (age 49)
- Children: 5

Religious life
- Religion: Judaism
- Denomination: Breslov Hasidism

Jewish leader
- Residence: Kiryat Gat, Israel

Ronit Barash (Hebrew: רונית ברש; born 7 June 1977) is an Israeli rebbetzin and a popular Jewish Breslov Hasidism preacher. She is known for her audience consisting of secular women.

== Early life ==
Barash was born on 7 June 1977. She grew up in a secular environment. In an interview in 2015, Barash explained that she was raped at the age of 14, becoming pregnant and giving her son up for adoption.

== Career ==
She began her professional career as an events and party planner. Her spiritual journey began by trying to incorporate certain religious traditions into her home life after returning to Israel following a spell in Miami, United States. Although she initially resisted her husband’s growing interest in Breslov Hasidism, a transformative experience during a trip in 2007 to the Ukrainian city Uman profoundly changed her life and led her to gradually embrace a religious way of life, eventually becoming a renowned rebbetzin. Barash became a rabbi in 2012. Since then Barash has become a popular preacher at events aimed exclusively at women, mainly secular women, with the aim of bringing them closer to Judaism. She is a follower of rabbi Nachman of Breslov. Among her followers are celebrities such as Mor Maman and Tahounia Rubel.

Barash has also organised pilgrimages to the tomb of rabbi Nachman in Uman with women from all over Israel for ten years

The Israeli filmmaker Orly Mirkin made two films about her: The Rebbetzin's Secret and The Rebbetzin Barash's Secrets Revealed. Following the huge success of the first one, Barash was subjected to a smear campaign, threats and sexist criticism from rabbis, and even came under attack with Molotov cocktails at one of her offices. In the second, she explained that she had been raped and that she had got in touch with the son she had had to give up for adoption.

In 2017, she launched her own clothing line. In an interview with Ynet in 2025, she explained that the word ‘feminism’ had caused her problems, so although she does not wish to define herself as such, she does advocate for gender equality and believes there should be female rabbis for women.

== Personal life ==
Barash is divorced, with whom have five children, and lives and works in Kiryat Gat. In 2016 Barash was admitted to hospital in a serious condition following a pulmonary embolism after an operation.
