= James F. Sallis =

US professor and psychologist

Academic background
- Education: BS, Business Administration and Psychology, 1973, Belhaven College; MS, Psychology, 1978, PhD, 1981, Clinical Psychology, Memphis State University
- Thesis: Altering arousal level in the elderly: effects an anxiety and depression (1981)
- Website: drjimsallis.org

James Fleming Sallis is an American psychologist. He is a Distinguished Professor of Family and Preventive Medicine at the University of California, San Diego and Director of Active Living Research.

== Early life and education ==
Sallis completed his Bachelor of Science degree in Business Administration and Psychology from Belhaven College before earning his Master's degree and PhD from Memphis State University.

== Career ==
Following his PhD, Sallis and colleague Thomas McKenzie received a five-year grant from the National Institutes of Health to establish the Sports, Play, and Active Recreation for Kids program. Also known as SPARK, the two researchers aimed to create an evidence-based, physical education and instructor training program. In 1993, an enterprise was established within the San Diego State University (SDSU) Research Foundation to disseminate SPARK on a non-profit basis. Following this, Sallis also oversaw a four-year observational epidemiologic study in two metropolitan areas in the United States for his project "Neighborhood Quality of Life Study." The aim of the study was to compare multiple health outcomes among residents of neighborhoods stratified on "walkability" characteristics and median household income.

As a result of his research, Sallis was appointed the program director of Active Living Research (ALR), a national program of the Robert Wood Johnson Foundation. In 2010, he helped create the first national, comprehensive plan to support and encourage physical activity among all Americans. Due to his success, Sallis was the recipient of the 2011 Lifetime Achievement Award from the President’s Council on Fitness, Sports and Nutrition. During this time, Sallis also joined the faculty at the University of California, San Diego (UCSD) as a professor of Family and Preventive Medicine. He was subsequently awarded the 2012 Bloomberg Manulife Prize for the Promotion of Active Health as a researcher "whose work promises to broaden our understanding of how physical activity, nutrition or psychosocial factors influence personal health and well-being."

In 2016, Sallis was elected to the National Academy of Medicine for having "devoted his career to promoting physical activity and understanding how policy and environmental influences impact health." In the same year, he was also recognized by Thomson Reuters as being amongst "The World’s Most Influential Scientific Minds."
