= Iraq al-Manshiyya =

Iraq al-Manshiyya عراق المنشية 'Iraq al-Manshiya, Arak el Menshiyeh
- Etymology: "The cliff of the place of growth"
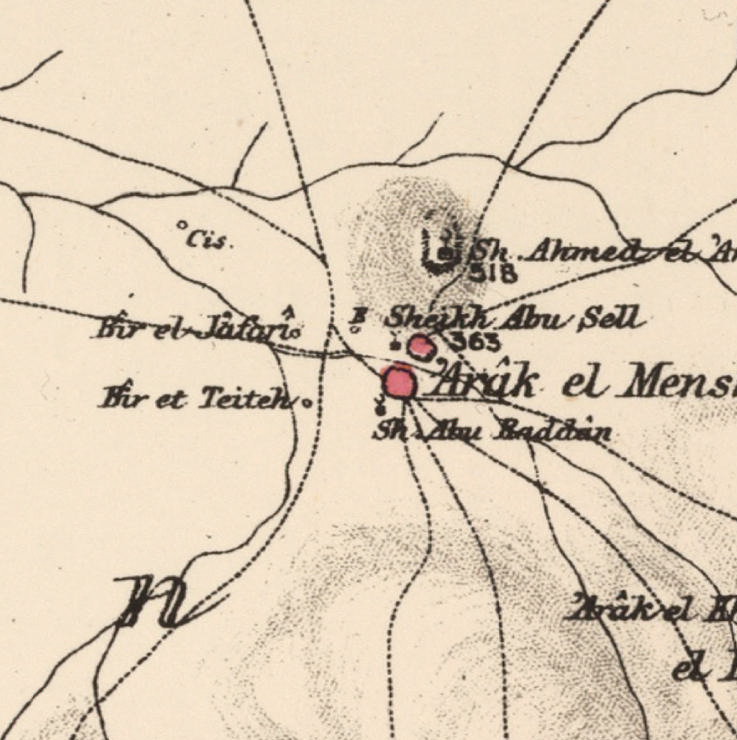
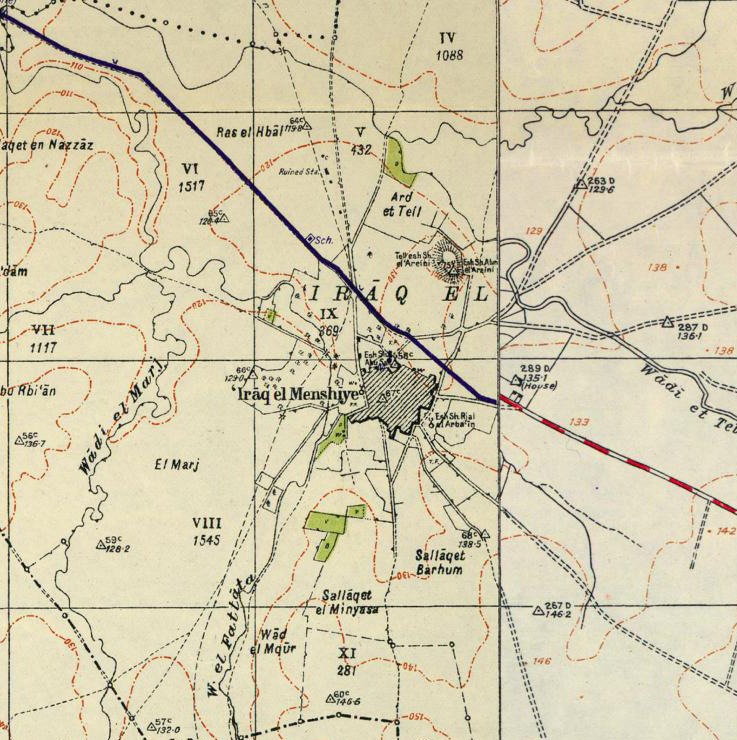
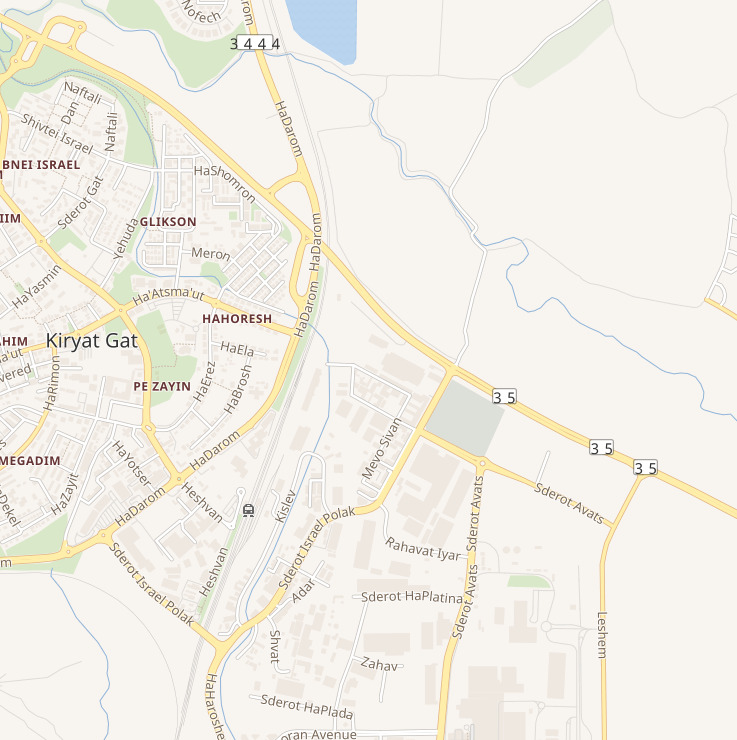
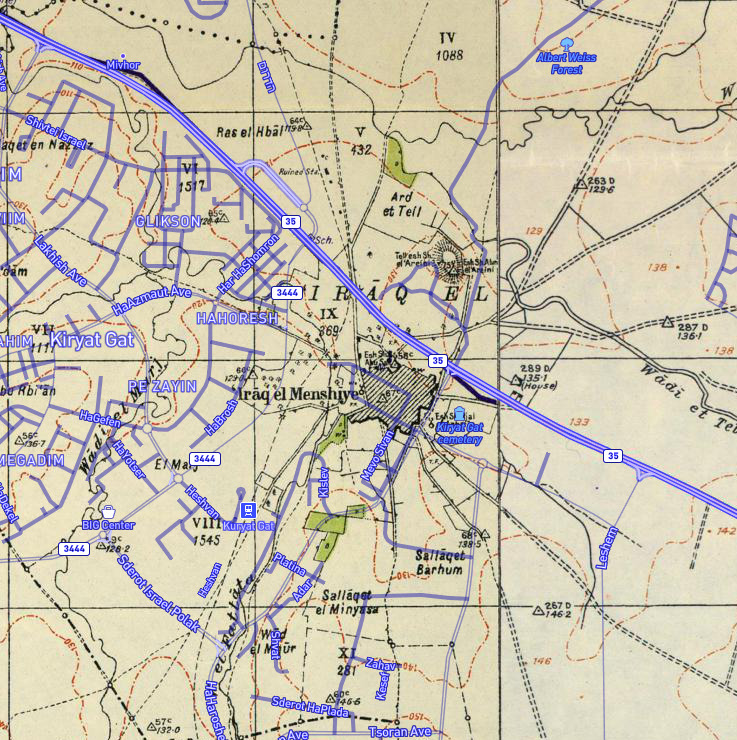
- 1870s map 1940s map modern map 1940s with modern overlay map A series of historical maps of the area around Iraq al-Manshiyya (click the buttons)

- Location within Mandatory Palestine
- Coordinates: 31°36′30″N 34°46′59″E
- Palestine grid: 129/112
- Geopolitical entity: Mandatory Palestine
- Subdistrict: Gaza
- Date of depopulation: February–June 1949

Area
  - Total: 17,901 dunams (17.901 km^{2}; 6.912 sq mi)

Population (1945)
  - Total: 2,010
- Cause(s) of depopulation: Expulsion by Yishuv forces
- Current Localities: Gat, Kiryat Gat, Sde Moshe

Iraq al-Manshiyya (Arabic: عراق المنشية) was a Palestinian Arab village located 32 km northeast of Gaza City. The village contained two mosques and a shrine for Shaykh Ahmad al-Arayni. It was depopulated after the 1948 Arab-Israeli War.

== Location ==
The village was located 32 km north-east of Gaza, in an area of rolling hills, where the coastal plain and the foothills of the Hebron mountains merged. It was on the south side of the highway between al-Faluja to the north-west, and Bayt Jibrin to the east.

It was also located at the foot of Tell Maqam Shaykh Ahmad al-Arayni, known in Hebrew as Tel Erani. It has been speculated that the mound was of Assyrian origin.

== History ==
According to one account, the village was established by migrants from a village named Iraq, who named the new settlement Manshiyya ("the built") after their original village, the location of which is unspecified. Its residents came from several places, including Egypt, Transjordan, and Bedouin communities.

Remains from the Early Bronze Age and Iron Age have been excavated at Tel Erani, and a Byzantine era burial site has been found south-west of the tell.

A khan was established in 717 H. (1317-1318 C.E.) by al-Malik Jukandar during the reign of the Mamluk sultan al-Nasir Muhammad ibn Qalawun. This is according to inscriptions on either side of the entrance to the Maqam (shrine) Shaykh Ahmad al-Arayni, at the summit of the tell. However, both Mayer and Sharon thought that the inscription text was not in situ, with Sharon suggesting that it originally came from a khan, As-Sukkariya, located 5 km south of the Maqam.

=== Ottoman Empire ===
Iraq al-Manshiyya, like the rest of Palestine, was incorporated into the Ottoman Empire in 1517, and in the census of 1596 it appeared under the name Iraq Hatim, located in the nahiya (subdistrict) of Gaza, part of Gaza Sanjak. It had a population of 11 Muslim households; an estimated 61 persons. They paid a fixed tax rate of 25% on a number of crops, including wheat, and barley, as well as goats and beehives; a total of 1,200 akçe.

In 1838, Edward Robinson noted the village, located SW of Summil, part of the Gaza district.

In 1863, Victor Guérin visited the village, and described a white domed waly on the top of the tell, north of the village. The village itself had around 300 inhabitants, but Guérin assumed it had formerly been larger. Around two wells were columns of gray-white marble. An Ottoman village list from about 1870 counted 114 houses and a population of 303, though the population count included men only.

In the late Ottoman Period, a railway station was established near the village, however, this station was destroyed in World War I.

In 1883, the PEF's Survey of Western Palestine described it as a village built of adobe bricks and surrounded by arable land. The village had a radial plan, with its smaller streets branching out from the intersection of two perpendicular main streets. Three wells supplied the village with water for domestic use. As the village grew, it expanded towards the northeast in the direction of the large mound, called Tall al-Shaykh Ahmad al- Urayni. At the summit, some 32 m. high, was the religious shrine for Shaykh Ahmad al-´Urayni. The shrine consisted of a roofless walled enclosure made of reused stone blocks. The doorway was located in the middle of the north wall. Above the doorway was a marble lintel, while on each side of the door were the above-mentioned inscriptions. Opposite, on the south wall, was a deep concave mihrab.

=== British Mandate ===
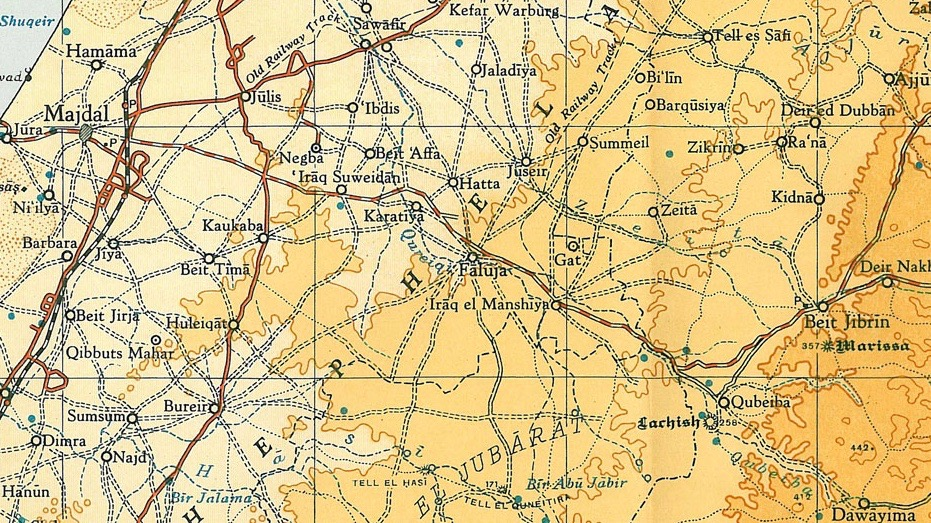
Iraq al-Manshiyya and surroundings 1945 1:250,000

The villagers worked primarily in agriculture; grain, grapes, and many varieties of trees (such as olive and almond trees) were cultivated. In the 1922 census of Palestine, conducted by the British Mandate authorities, ‘Eraq el-Manshiya had a population of 1,132 Muslims, increasing in the 1931 census to 1347, still all Muslims, in 299 houses. The kibbutz Gat was established in 1941 on lands that the Jewish National Fund acquired from the village.

In the 1945 statistics the population of al-Manshiyya was counted with that of Gat; the two villages had a total population of 2,220; 2,010 Muslims and 210 Jews respectively, with a total of 17,901 dunams of land. Of this, Arabs used 53 dunams for plantations and irrigable land, 13,449 for cereals, while they had 35 dunams as built-up land. Goats and sheep supplied the materials (hair and yarn) needed for rug weaving. The villagers dyed their rugs in al-Faluja, where they also went for medical treatment and other services.

=== Israel ===
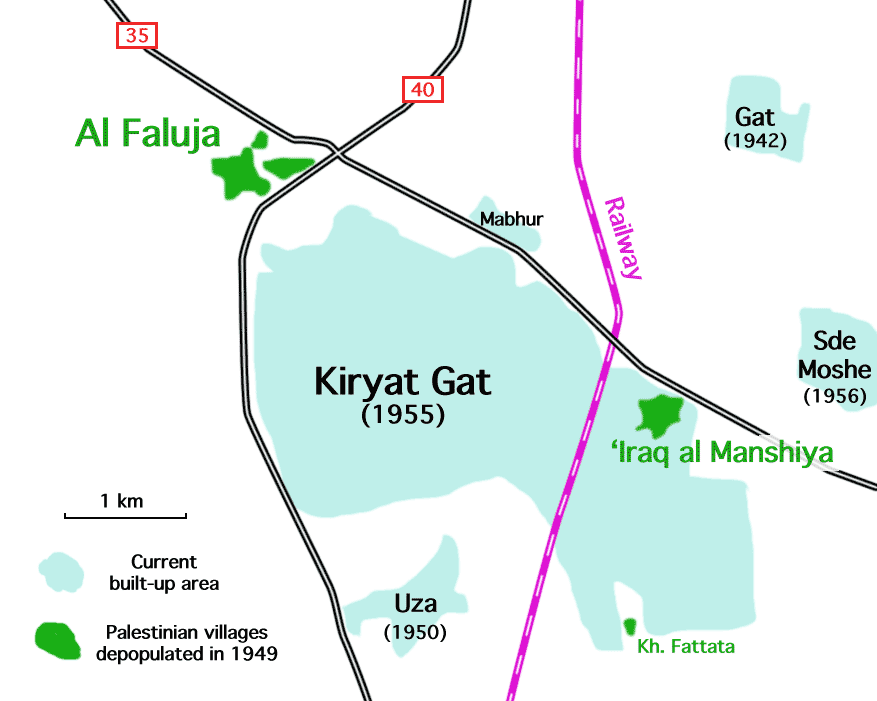
Historical setting of Iraq al-Manshiyya

Iraq al-Manshiyya was in the territory allotted to the Arab state under the 1947 UN Partition Plan.

However, it was captured by Israel's Alexandroni Brigade in October 1948 from Egyptian forces in Operation Yoav. The Egyptian Army controlled the area - which included al-Faluja - surrounded by Israeli forces. After Egypt and Israel negotiated an armistice agreement, the Israel Defense Forces intimidated the inhabitants to flee.

Following the war, the area was incorporated into the State of Israel, after which kibbutz Gat took over additional lands after the expulsion of the villagers. In 1954 Kiryat Gat was established on village land, and in 1956 Sde Moshe was established on village land east of the village site.

According to the Palestinian historian Walid Khalidi, the structures on the village land in 1992 are: "A forest of eucalyptus has been planted on the site, and two signs, each in both Hebrew and English, identify it as "Margolin Peace Forest." Only traces of the village streets remain, along with scattered cactuses. Part of the surrounding land is cultivated by Israeli farmers."

The shrine stood until at least 1946 when it was inspected by the Antiquities Department. During the 1950s it was described as being in a very ruinous condition, and Petersen, inspecting it in 1994, found no inscriptions or standing structures; an outline on the ground were the only visible remains of the building.

== See also ==
- Depopulated Palestinian locations in Israel

== Bibliography ==
- Barron, J.B., ed. (1923). Palestine: Report and General Abstracts of the Census of 1922. Government of Palestine.
- Benvenisti, M. (2002). Sacred Landscape: The Buried History of the Holy Land Since 1948. University of California Press. ISBN 978-0-520-23422-2. (pp. 156, 203, 318)
- Conder, C.R.; Kitchener, H.H. (1883). The Survey of Western Palestine: Memoirs of the Topography, Orography, Hydrography, and Archaeology. Vol. 3. London: Committee of the Palestine Exploration Fund.
- Government of Palestine, Department of Statistics (1945). Village Statistics, April, 1945.
- Guérin, V. (1869). Description Géographique Historique et Archéologique de la Palestine (in French). Vol. 1: Judee, pt. 2. Paris: L'Imprimerie Nationale.
- Hadawi, S. (1970). Village Statistics of 1945: A Classification of Land and Area ownership in Palestine. Palestine Liberation Organization Research Centre.
- Hartmann, M. (1883). "Die Ortschaftenliste des Liwa Jerusalem in dem türkischen Staatskalender für Syrien auf das Jahr 1288 der Flucht (1871)". Zeitschrift des Deutschen Palästina-Vereins. 6: 102–149.
- Hütteroth, W.-D.; Abdulfattah, K. (1977). Historical Geography of Palestine, Transjordan and Southern Syria in the Late 16th Century. Erlanger Geographische Arbeiten, Sonderband 5. Erlangen, Germany: Vorstand der Fränkischen Geographischen Gesellschaft. ISBN 3-920405-41-2.
- Khalidi, W. (1992). All That Remains: The Palestinian Villages Occupied and Depopulated by Israel in 1948. Washington D.C.: Institute for Palestine Studies. ISBN 0-88728-224-5.
- Lifshits, Vladik (2014-12-31). "Tel 'Erani (Southwest)" (126). Hadashot Arkheologiyot – Excavations and Surveys in Israel.
- Mayer, L.A. (1932). "Araq al-Manshiyyeh". Quarterly of the Department of Antiquities in Palestine. 1: 42–43.
- Mayer, L.A. (1933). Saracenic Heraldry: A Survey. Oxford: Oxford University Press. (Cited in Petersen, 2001)
- Mills, E., ed. (1932). Census of Palestine 1931. Population of Villages, Towns and Administrative Areas. Jerusalem: Government of Palestine.
- Morris, B. (2004). The Birth of the Palestinian Refugee Problem Revisited. Cambridge University Press. ISBN 978-0-521-00967-6.
- Nasser, G.A. (1955/1973): Memoirs of the First Palestine War in Journal of Palestine Studies no. 2 (Win. 1973): 3-32
- Palmer, E.H. (1881). The Survey of Western Palestine: Arabic and English Name Lists Collected During the Survey by Lieutenants Conder and Kitchener, R. E. Transliterated and Explained by E.H. Palmer. Committee of the Palestine Exploration Fund.
- Petersen, Andrew (2001). A Gazetteer of Buildings in Muslim Palestine (British Academy Monographs in Archaeology). Vol. I. Oxford University Press. ISBN 978-0-19-727011-0. Archived from the original on 2021-05-29.
- Robinson, E.; Smith, E. (1841). Biblical Researches in Palestine, Mount Sinai and Arabia Petraea: A Journal of Travels in the year 1838. Vol. 2. Boston: Crocker & Brewster.
- Robinson, E.; Smith, E. (1841). Biblical Researches in Palestine, Mount Sinai and Arabia Petraea: A Journal of Travels in the year 1838. Vol. 3. Boston: Crocker & Brewster.
- Sharon, M. (2013). Corpus Inscriptionum Arabicarum Palaestinae, H-I. Vol. 5. BRILL. ISBN 978-90-04-25097-0.
- Socin, A. (1879). "Alphabetisches Verzeichniss von Ortschaften des Paschalik Jerusalem". Zeitschrift des Deutschen Palästina-Vereins. 2: 135–163.
- Warren, C.; Conder, C.R. (1884). The Survey of Western Palestine: Jerusalem. London: Committee of the Palestine Exploration Fund.
- Yegorov, Dmitry; Milevski, Ianir (2017-03-01). "Tel ʽErani" (129). Hadashot Arkheologiyot – Excavations and Surveys in Israel.
