= Kfir Swisa =

Mayor of Kiryat Gat, Israel

- כפיר סויסה
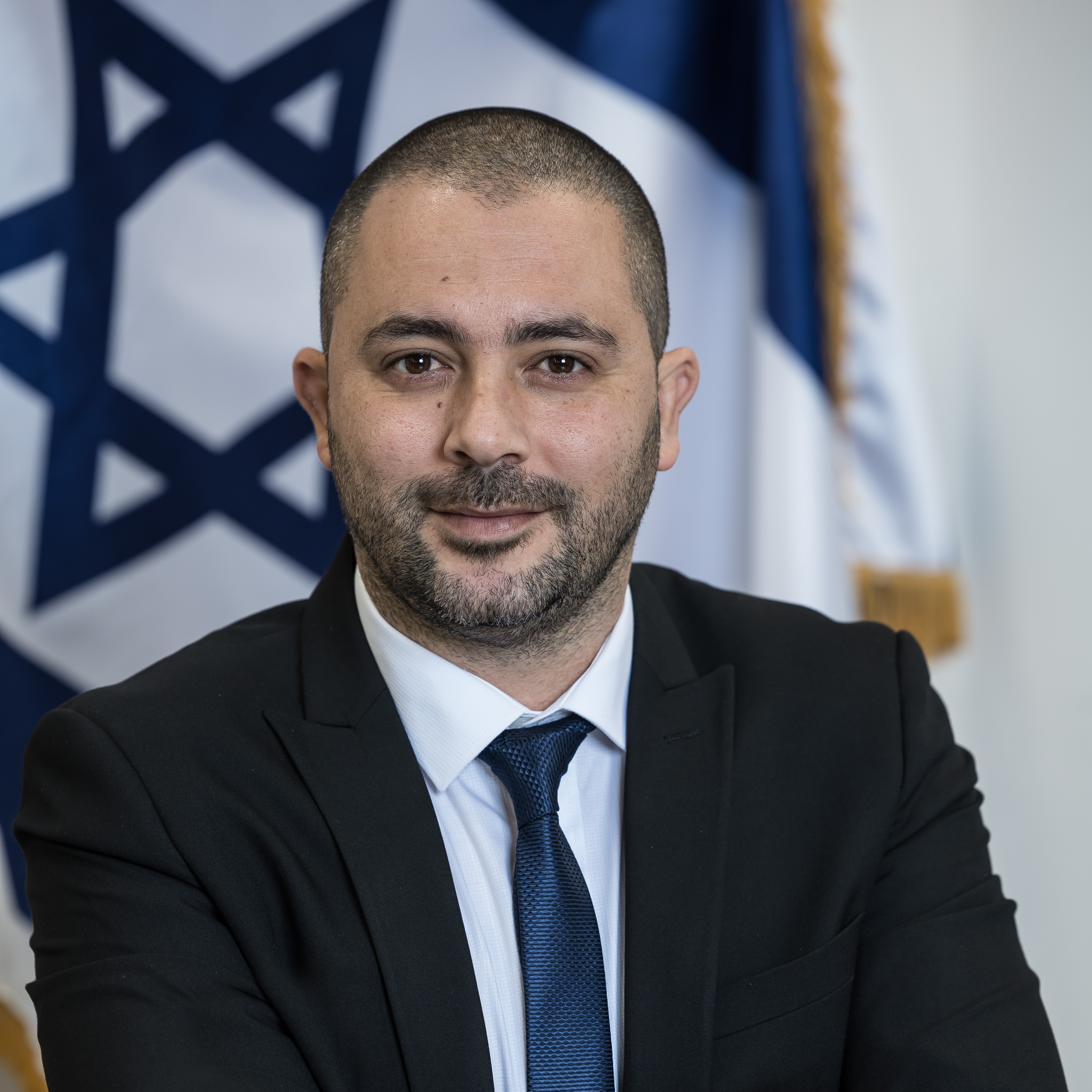
- Kfir Suissa, 2023

Mayor of Kiryat Gat
- Incumbent
- Assumed office 2024
- Preceded by: Aviram Dahari

Personal details
- Born: October 26, 1983 (age 42) Kiryat Gat, Israel
- Occupation: Mayor

Kfir Suissa (Hebrew: כפיר סוויסה; born October 26, 1983) is an Israeli politician, current mayor of Kiryat Gat. Prior to that he was a member of the Kiryat Gat city council and chairman of the PA's audit committee. He served as director general of the Ministry of Culture and Sports and CEO of Likud Global (Hebrew: הליכוד העולמי).

== Biography ==
Suissa graduated with a bachelor's degree in administration and public policy from Sapir College in Sderot.

From 2005–2009, he was an operations manager at "Shamraz Technological Services" company.

In 2014, he was appointed CEO of the Maccabi Kiryat Gat B.C. basketball, and served in the position until 2018. Under his management, the team qualified for the Premier League and played in it for two seasons. In its last season, the team won the Israeli Basketball Leumit Cup, finished as the regular league champion and lost in the playoff final series to Hapoel Be'er Sheva This season was characterized by a severe financial crisis that befell the team due to the cessation of support from the local authority, and at the end of that season, he was also a member of the board of directors of the Israeli Basketball Premier League.

From 2018 to January 2023, he was a member of the Kiryat Gat City Council on behalf of the "Kiryat Gat Winning" faction that won two mandates under his leadership and chairman of the council's Audit committee. Between the years 2020-2021, he served as the chief of staff of the chairman of the coalition in the Knesset, Miki Zohar, and managed the office staff and the work of the chairman of the coalition in front of the various Knesset committees, ministers and members of the Knesset.

In November 2021, he was appointed to the Board of Jewish National Fund, and was also appointed to the position of chairman of the land development manager's committee in the organization. In the same month, he was appointed CEO of Likud Global (Hebrew: הליכוד העולמי), a position he held until 2022.

In January 2023, the Minister of Culture and Sports, Miki Zohar, appointed Suissa as the director general of the ministry.

In June 2023 he announced the end of his position in favor of running for mayor of Kiryat Gat in 2024 Israeli municipal elections. the local authority elections. Suissa was supported by the municipal committee of the Likud. The incumbent mayor Aviram Dehari petitioned the movement's court and it ruled on the holding of Primary election in the local Likud branch. In the primary elections, Dehri won with a majority of 54%, and won the support of the Likud for his candidacy.

In the first round of the elections, 4 candidates competed. Suisa received 33.3% of the votes, and advanced to the second round against outgoing mayor Aviram Dehri, who received 33.8% of the votes. For the second round that took place on March 10, 2024, Suissa member Legal Weinberger received 11.4% of the votes in the first elections. while Dahri joined his opponent Yakir Schindler who received 21.6% of the votes. In the second round of the elections, Suissa was elected mayor.
