= Tel Erani =

Archaeological site in southern Israel

Tel ʽErani
- تل الشيخ أحمد العريني (Arabic)
- Tell esh-Sheikh el-ʽAreini
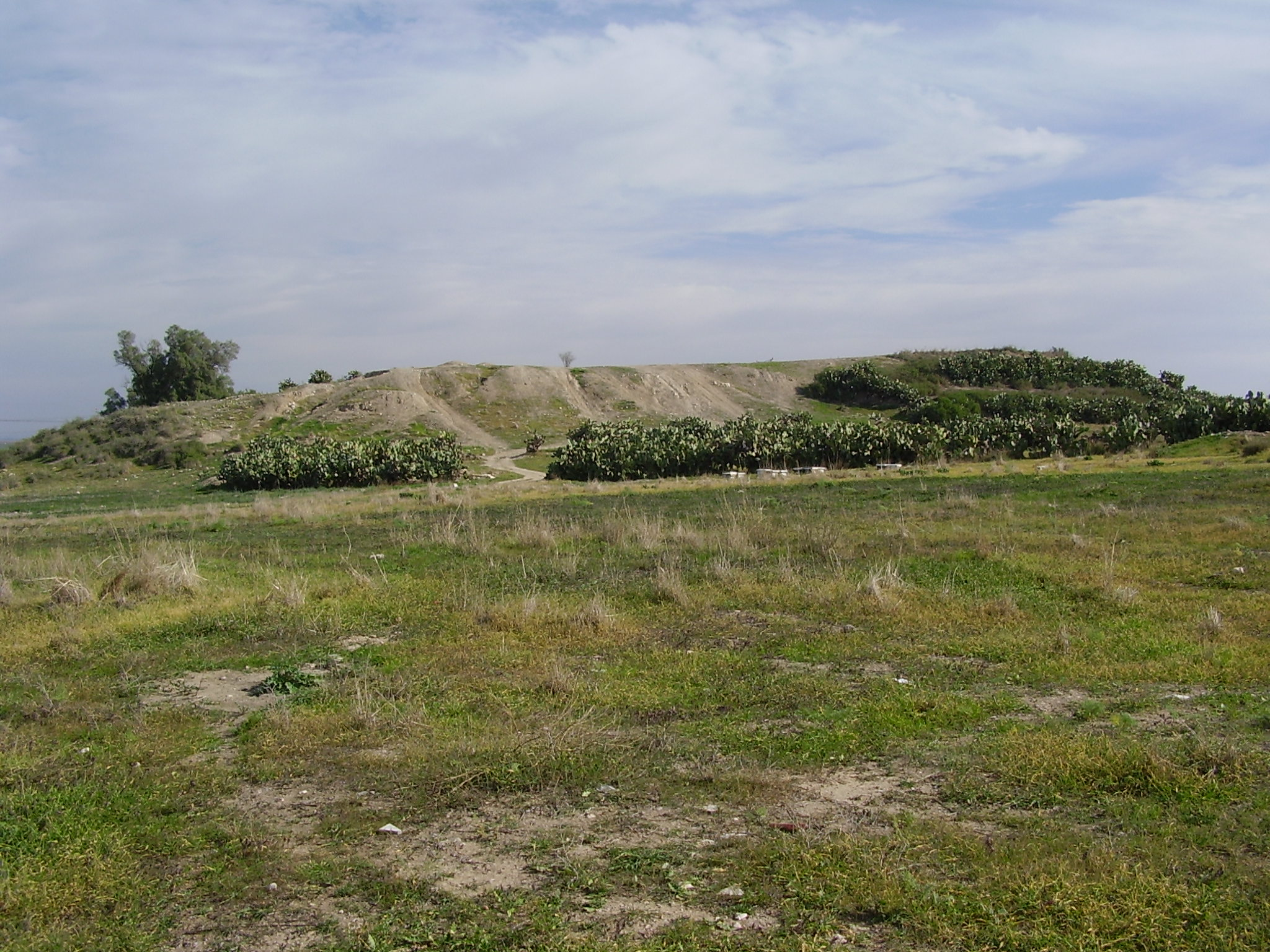
- View of Tel ʽErani

- Location within Israel
- 31°36′42″N 34°47′6″E
- Periods: Early Bronze Age, Iron Age, Hellenistic, Roman, Byzantine, Mamluk, Ottoman
- Cultures: Canaanite, Jewish, Greco-Roman
- Location: Israel
- Region: Southern District (Israel) (Formerly: Idumea)
- Grid position: 17973/61309 PAL

Site notes
- Excavation dates: 1956–1958, 1985–1988, 2013–2018
- Condition: Tel (Ruin)
- Public access: Yes
- Website: Tel Erani

Tel Erani (Hebrew: תל עירני) or Tell esh-Sheikh Ahmed el-ʿAreini (Arabic: تل الشيخ أحمد العريني) is a multi-period archaeological site on the outskirts of Kiryat Gat in the Southern District of Israel. It is also known by the name ʻIrâq el-Menshiyeh ("vein-like sand ridges of Menshiyeh"), although thought to have borne the original Arabic name of Menshiyet es-Saḥalīn. The tell was first occupied in the Chalcolithic period, but its most notable remains are from the Bronze Age and Iron Age, when it was the site of a substantial Philistine city with links to Egypt, before becoming a Judahite town. It has been identified with the biblical cities of Libnah, Gath, Mmst, Eglon and Makkedah, but none of these identifications are certain. The city was destroyed by the Assyrians in the 8th century BCE, and again in the 6th century BCE, possibly by the Babylonians. In the Persian period, it was the site of a temple. There are also signs of settlement in the Hellenistic, Byzantine, and Mamluk periods. The Palestinian village of Iraq al-Manshiyya was located at the foot of the tell until it was depopulated in the 1948 Arab–Israeli War.

== Discovery and history of investigations ==
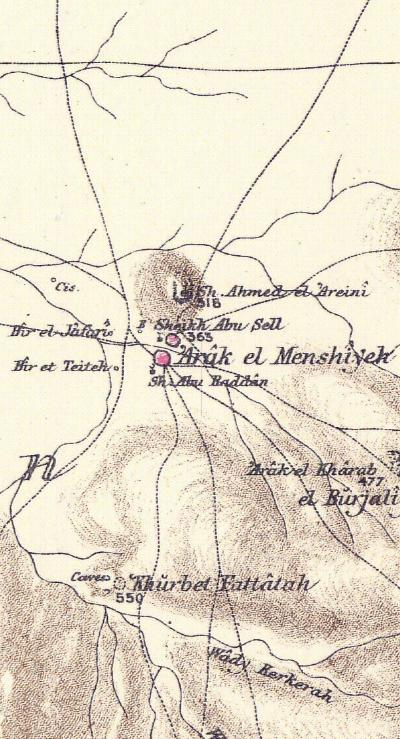
Excerpt from mao sheet 20 of Conder and Kitchener's Survey of Western Palestine showing Tel Erani (Sh. Ahmed el-ʿAreini)

Tel Erani was first documented by Claude Reignier Conder and Herbert Kitchener in their 1872–1877 survey for the Palestine Exploration Fund. They described the contemporary village of Iraq al-Manshiyya and remarked that the site was "evidently ancient and important, and seems possibly to represent the ancient Libnah." The identification of Tel Erani with the biblical city of Libnah was based on the chalk in the hills nearby – the name of the city meaning 'the white' in ancient Hebrew. Remains from the 10th century BCE have been found at the site. The town, then belonging to the kingdom of Judah, was destroyed in 701 BCE, with 15 LMLK jar handles discovered among the debris.

In 1921, William F. Albright argued that the site was a poor fit with Libnah, and instead proposed it was the major Philistine city of Gath. He placed Libnah at Tell es-Safi, which most scholars of the time identified with Gath. When the Palestinian population was forced out of the area in the 1948 Arab–Israeli War, Albright's theory was the basis for naming the new Israeli settlements of Kiryat Gat and Kibbutz Gat.

=== New identification ===
Historical geographer, M.D. Press, concludes that Tel Erani, by way of a transformation of its name, may have been the 1st-century Idumean town of Sallis (= Shiḥlayim) mentioned by Josephus (The Jewish War 3.2.2. ). A citadel (acropolis) was once built at the site, making it a likely place of refuge for a retreating army en route from Ascalon to Jerusalem.

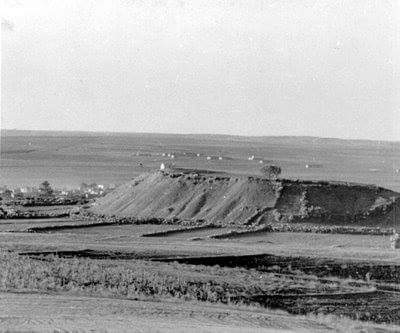
Photo showing Tel Erani and village Iraq al-Manshiyya - 1940

== Excavations ==
The site is very large, more than 24 hectares.

=== Yeivin dig (1950s) ===
In the late 1950s, Shmuel Yeivin opened excavations at the site (then known as Tel Gat) to confirm Albright's identification. Although he did find Iron Age material, the pottery was not consistent with a Philistine city. Albright's theory was therefore rejected. Instead, Yeivin discovered that the main phase of occupation of the site was earlier, in the Early Bronze Age. He also found what was then the earliest evidence of contact between Egypt and Canaan: a potsherd bearing the serekh of the pharaoh Narmer.

=== Jagiellonian University excavations ===
Polish archaeologists from Jagiellonian University in Krakow have been excavating here since 2013. They found that the oldest artefacts on the site may date to the Amratian culture (Naqada I) ca 4,000 BC. So the ancient Egyptian trading post at Tel Erani may be much older that previously thought.

"Last year’s [2018] research by the Kraków archaeologists proved that the inhabitants of Lower Egypt maintained relations with the southern Levant where Tel Erani lies. “We proved that [the relations] were very lively,” said Professor Ciałowicz, adding that both regions were cooperating with one another closely in 4,000 BC. Copper and olive oil flowed into Egypt and animal and fish meat was transported in the opposite direction."

An Early Bronze Age I fortification wall was also discovered in 2018, which may date to over 5,300 years old. This may be the oldest such defense wall in Israel.

== See also ==
- Taur Ikhbeineh – 34th century BC archaeological site in Palestine
- Tel Lachish
- Tell es-Sakan – Bronze Age archaeological site in Palestine
- Kefar Shihlayim
