= Kiryat Gat =

City in southern Israel

Kiryat Gat קריית גת
- City

Hebrew transcription(s)
  - ISO 259: Qiryat Gatt
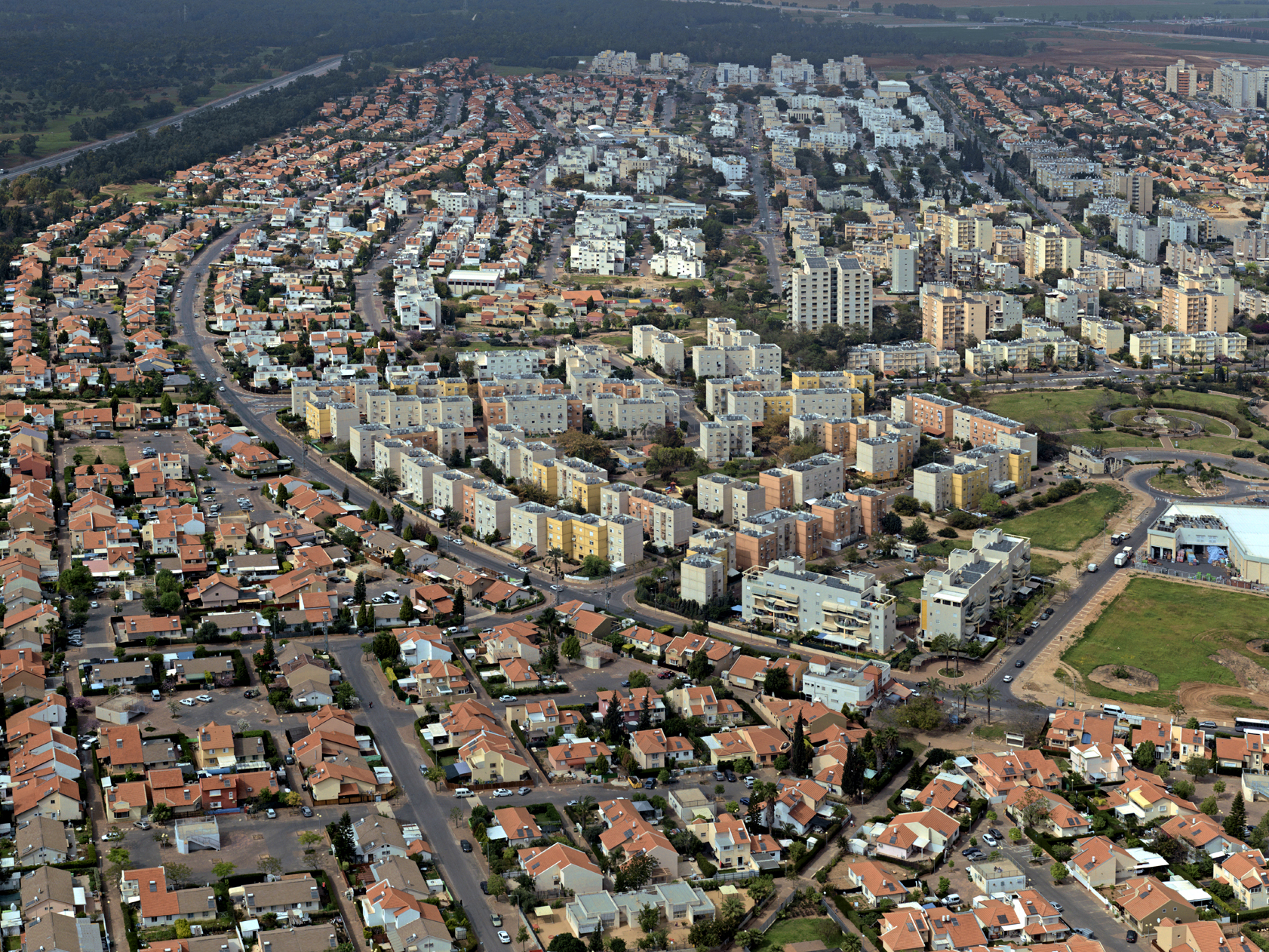
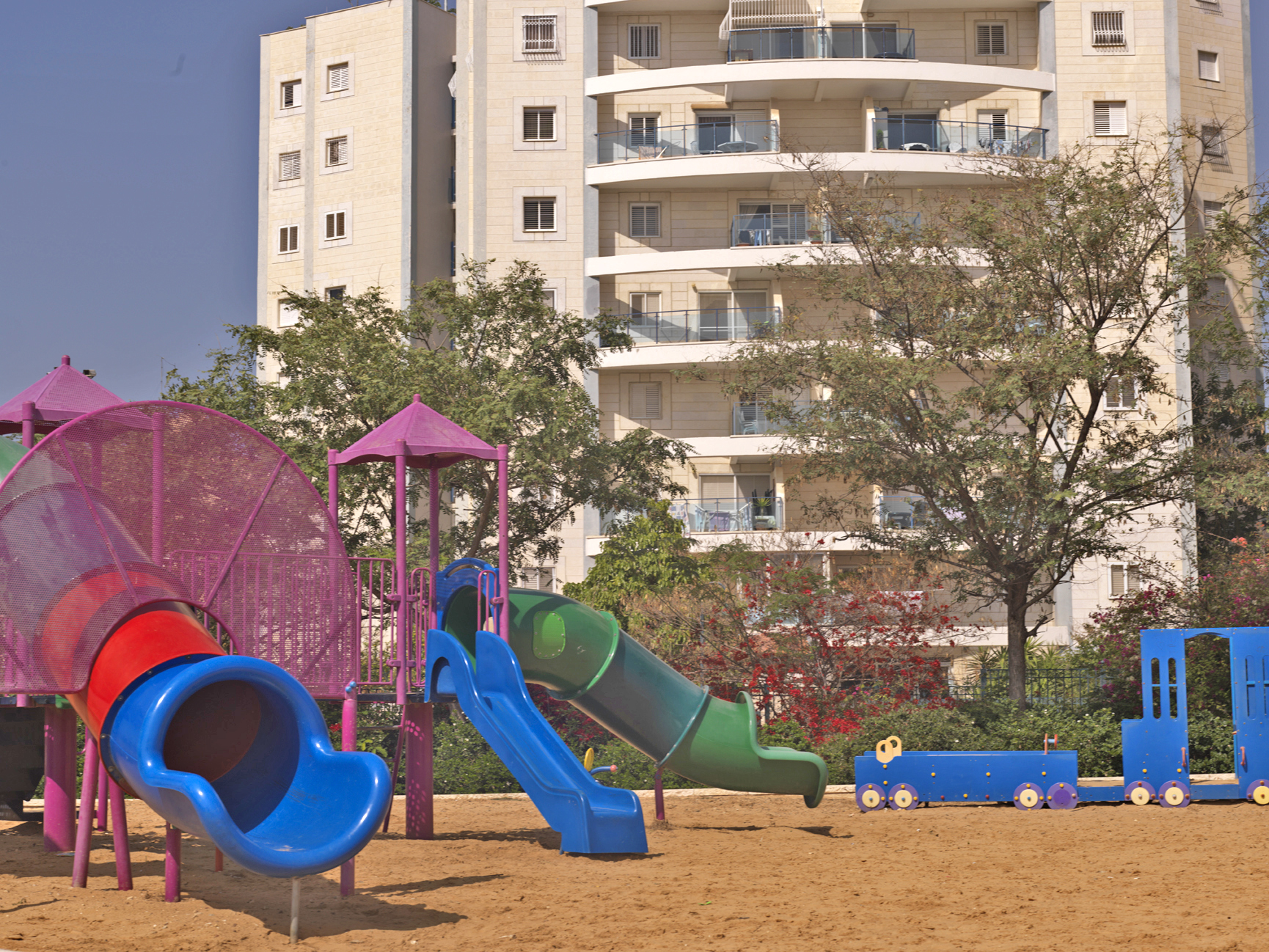
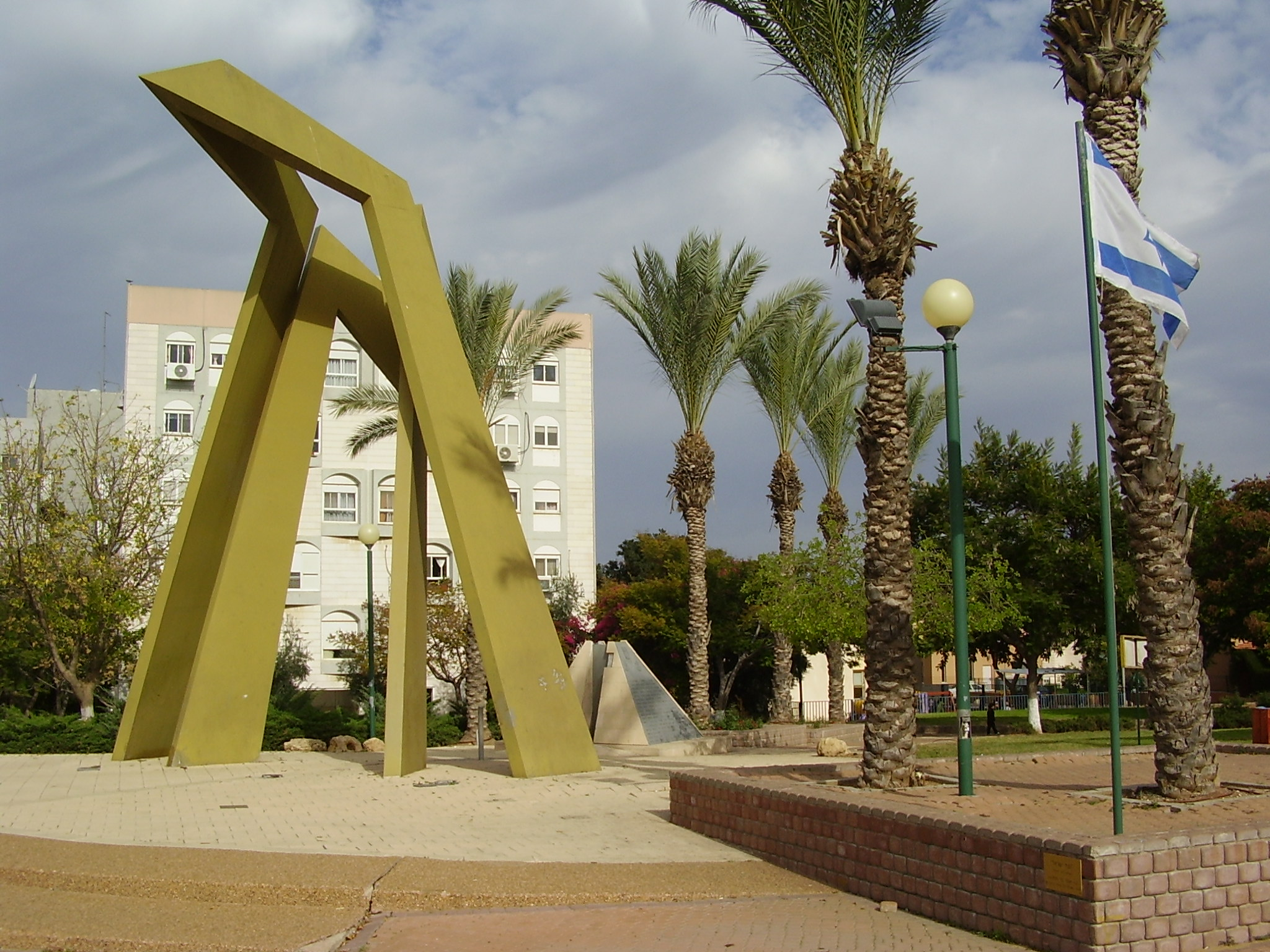
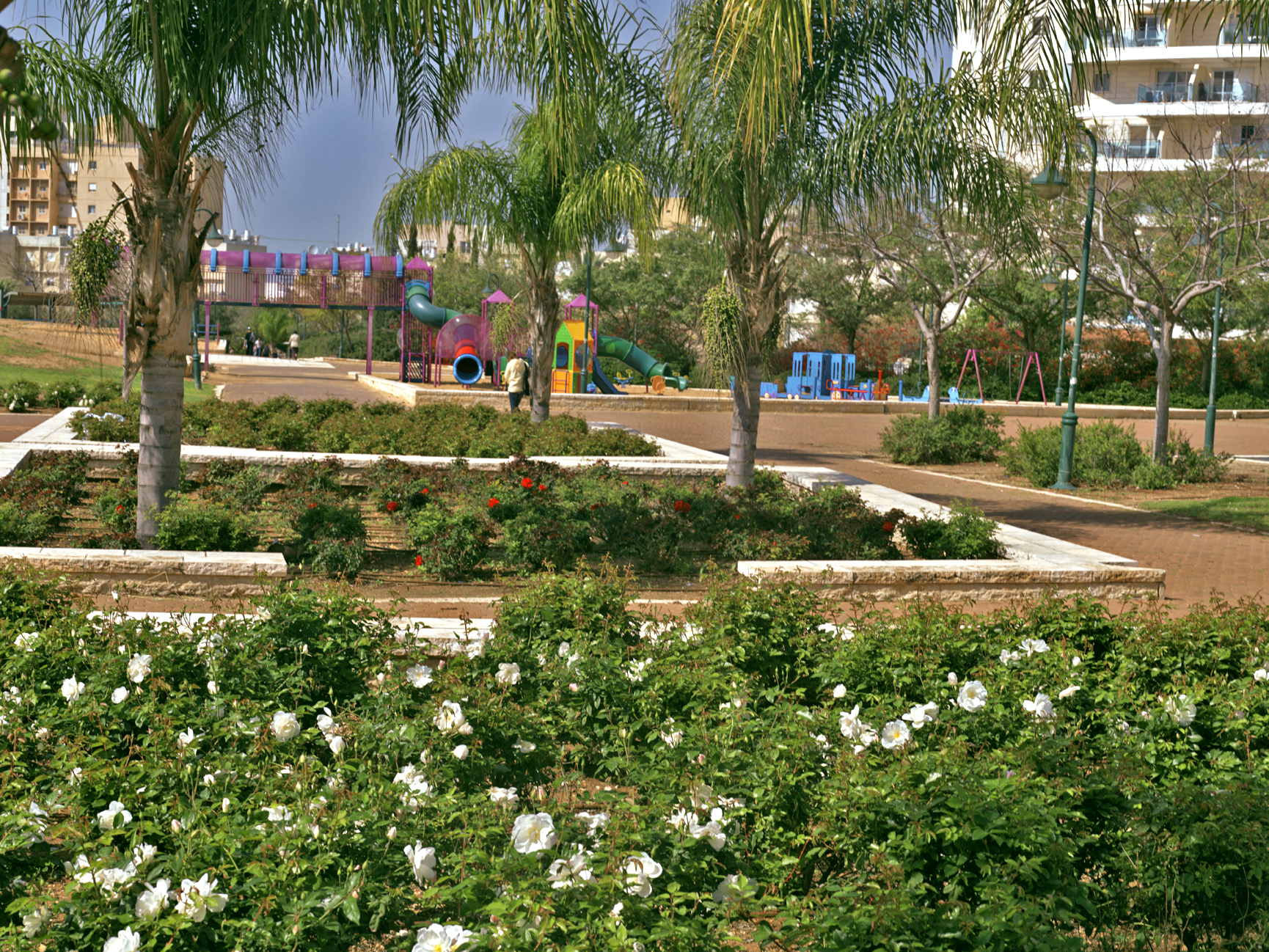
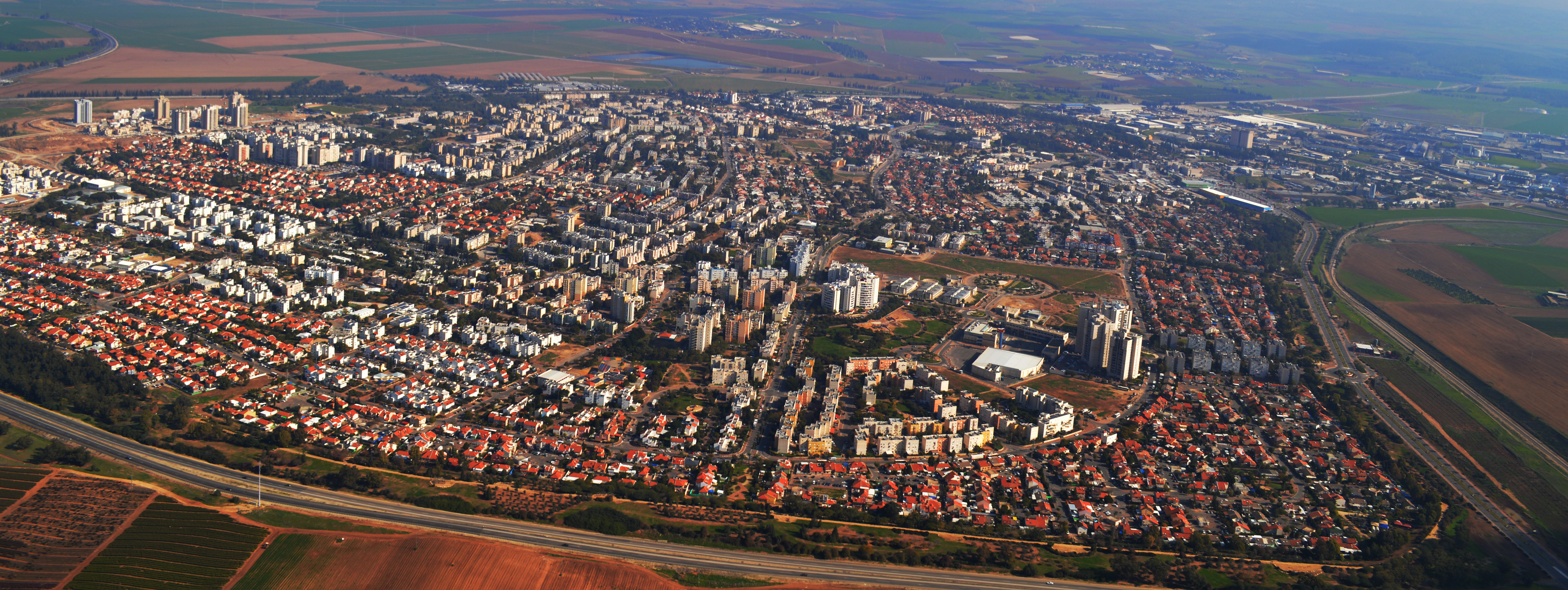

- Flag Coat of arms

- Location of Kiryat Gat in Israel Kiryat Gat (Israel)
- Coordinates: 31°36′22″N 34°46′18″E
- Country: Israel
- District: Southern
- Subdistrict: Ashkelon
- Natural Region: Lakhish
- Founded: 1954

Government
  - Mayor: Kfir Swisa

Area
  - Total: 17,102 dunams (17.102 km^{2}; 6.603 sq mi)

Population (2024)
  - Total: 72,140
  - Density: 4,218/km^{2} (10,930/sq mi)

Ethnicity
  - Jews and others: 64,338
  - Arabs: 100
- Name meaning: City of Gat
- Website: www.qiryat-gat.muni.il

Kiryat Gat (Hebrew: קריית גת, lit. 'City of Gat') also spelled Qiryat Gat, is a city in the Southern District of Israel. It lies 56 km (35 miles) south of Tel Aviv, 43 km (27 mi) north of Beersheba, and 68 km (42 mi) west southwest of Jerusalem. In 2024 it had a population of 72,140. The city hosts one of the most advanced semiconductor fabrication plants in the world, Intel's Fab 28 plant producing 7 nm process chips.

== Etymology ==
Kiryat Gat was mistakenly named for Gath, one of the five major cities of the Philistines. In Hebrew, "gat" means "winepress". In the 1950s, archaeologists found ruins at a nearby tell named Tel Erani and identified it as the Philistine city of Gath. Later archeologists proved this to be incorrect, but not before Kiryat Gat had been named in 1954. It proved too difficult to subsequently change the city’s name. This event cooled earlier enthusiasm for restoring biblical names more widely across the region.

The location most favored for Gath now is Tel es-Safi, thirteen kilometers (8.1 miles) to the northeast.

== History ==
Remains of an ancient Jewish settlement from the Second Temple period have been discovered in Kiryat Gat. Stone vessels and a 25-ton ritual bath dating back 2,000 years were uncovered by the Israel Antiquities Authority, marking the first evidence of an ancient Jewish settlement in the transitional zone between the northern Negev and the Judean lowlands, an area where no Jewish settlements had previously been documented.

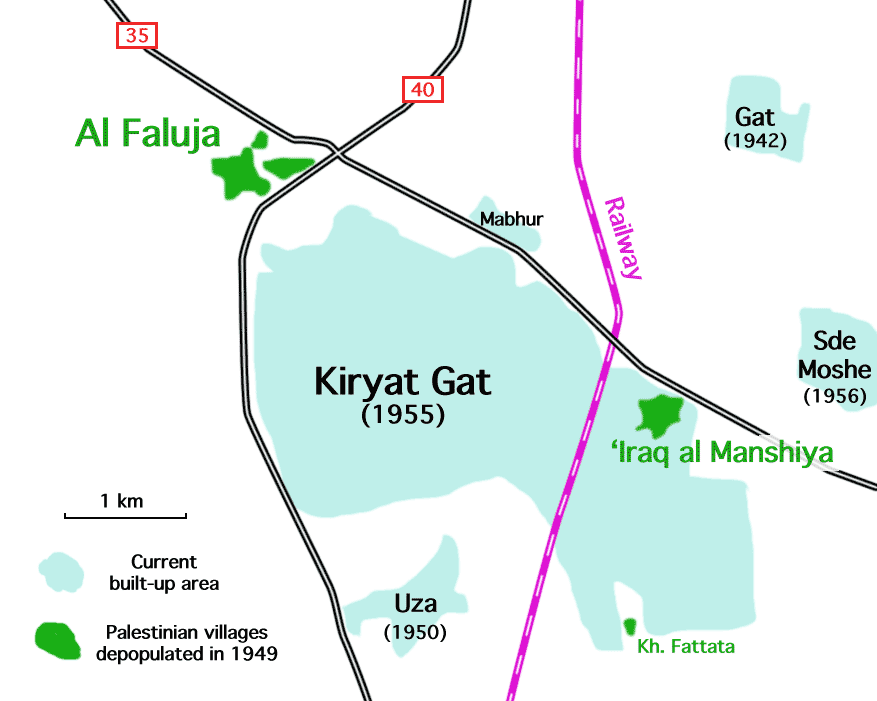
Historical setting of Kiryat Gat

Kiryat Gat was founded in 1954, initially as a ma'abara. The following year it was established as a development town by 18 families from Morocco. It was founded just west of the Palestinian Arab village of Iraq al-Manshiyya, which was depopulated during the 1948 Palestine war. The former location of Iraq al-Manshiyya is now within the built-up area of Kiryat Gat. By 1992, Kiryat Gat had grown and spread also onto land near the former village of Al-Faluja.

The population of Kiryat Gat rose from 4,400 inhabitants in 1958 to 17,000 in 1969, mostly Jewish immigrants from North Africa. The economy was initially based on processing the agricultural produce of the Lachish region, such as cotton and wool. In December 1972, Kiryat Gat's municipal status was upgraded and it became Israel's 31st city.

During the 1990s, the mass immigration of Soviet Jews to Israel brought many new residents to the town and its population grew to 42,500 by 1995. The development of the Rabin industrial zone on the eastern edge of the city, and the opening of Highway 6 further improved the economy of the city.

In 2018, the first residents began moving into Carmei Gat, a new neighborhood to the north of Kiryat Gat. The area has attracted a diverse population, including a significant Anglo community. It has grown to approximately 10,000 housing units, with plans underway to double the city's population in the coming years. An ancient ritual bath lifted intact from a construction site in the neighborhood in 2026 will be returned and incorporated into an open public space after the construction work is completed.

== Climate ==
Kiryat Gat has a hot-summer Mediterranean climate (Csa) and a hot semi-arid climate (Bsh). Summers are hot and dry, and winters are moderately rainy and mild. The annual amount of precipitation is around 405 mm and mostly falls in winter. The mean daily maximum temperature in January is 17 °C, while in August it is 33 °C.

== Demographics ==
Historical population
Year	Pop.	±%
1972	19,900	—
1983	25,800	+29.6%
1995	43,700	+69.4%
2008	47,500	+8.7%
2022	63,386	+33.4%
2024	72,139	+13.8%

In 2012, the ethnic makeup of the city was 93.8 percent Jewish. In its early years, Kiryat Gat was populated mainly by Jews of Sephardi/Mizrahi origin. Since the mass immigration of Soviet Jews, approximately one third of the inhabitants hail from the former Soviet Union.

== Economy ==
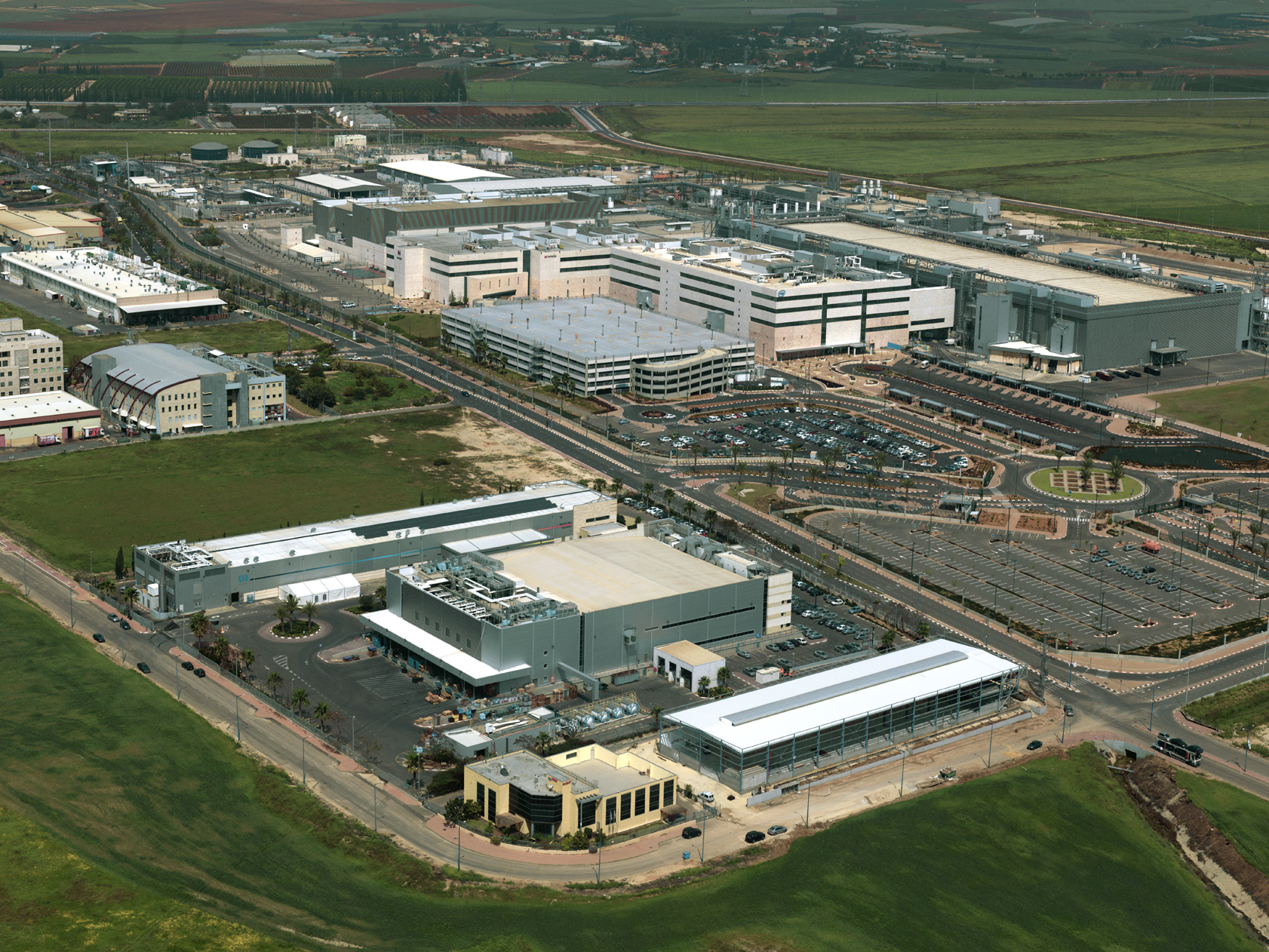
The HP, Intel, and Micron production plants in Kiryat Gat

The Polgat textile factory was the main employer in the town until it closed in the 1990s. In 1999, Intel opened a chip fabrication plant, known as Fab 18, to produce Pentium 4 chips and flash memories. Intel received a grant of $525 million from the Israeli government to build the plant. In February 2006, the cornerstone was laid for Intel's second Kiryat Gat plant, Fab 28. Despite this, Kiryat Gat has one of Israel's highest unemployment rates. In 2021, Intel announced a $10 billion investment in new manufacturing in Kiryat Gat.

The headquarters and small-arms (guns) manufacturing facility of Israeli Weapons Industries is located in Kiryat Gat.

== Transportation ==
Kiryat Gat is served by the Kiryat Gat Railway Station on the Tel Aviv - Be'er Sheva inter-city line of Israel Railways. Kiryat Gat is situated between two major highways, Highway 40 to the west of the town and Highway 6.

== Education ==
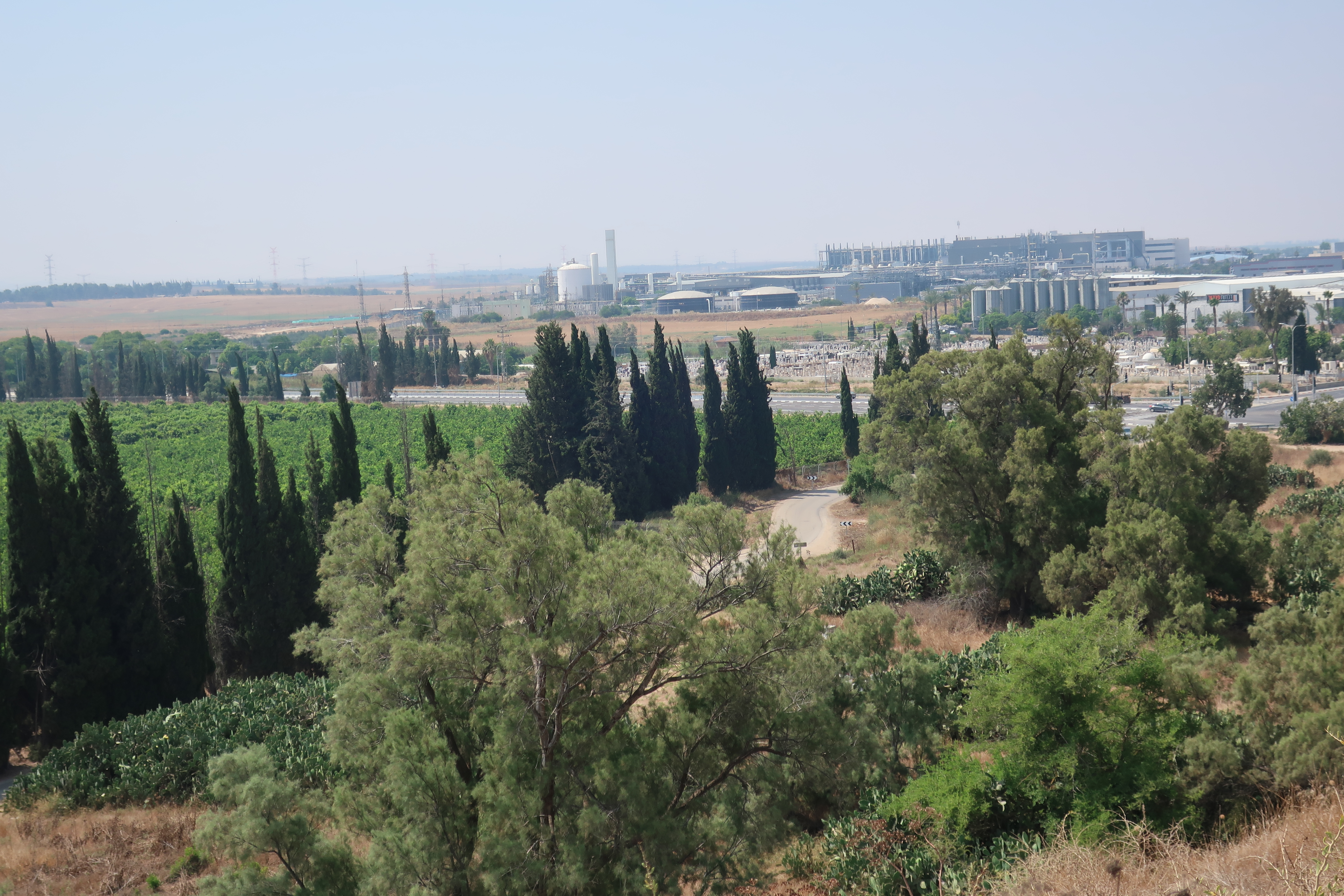
View of Kiryat Gat's industrial area from Tel Erani

Kiryat Gat has 25 schools with an enrollment of 10,676. Of these schools, 18 are elementary schools with a student population of 5,498, and 13 are high schools with a student population of 5,178. In 2001, 54.7% of Kiryat Gat's 12th grade students graduated with a matriculation certificate. Kiryat Gat has a Pedagogic Center, science centers, a computerized library and a center devoted to industry, art and technology. In 2012, a high school student from Kiryat Gat won first prize in the First Step to Nobel Prize in Physics competition.

== Voting patterns ==
In the 2022 election, 74 percent of voters in Kiryat Gat voted for the parties of the right-wing coalition led by Benjamin Netanyahu, while 24 percent voted for the parties of the center-left coalition led by Yair Lapid and 0.1 percent voted for the Arab parties.

In the 2026 election, 72 percent of voters in Kiryat Gat voted for the parties of the right-wing coalition led by Benjamin Netanyahu, while 22 percent voted for the parties of the center-left coalition led by Gadi Eisenkot and 0.1 percent voted for the Arab parties. An additional 2.9 percent voted for the Reservists, and 1.5 percent voted for Amcha Yisrael. Voter turnout increased 21 percent from the 2022 election.

== Twin towns – sister cities ==
Kiryat Gat is twinned with:

- Chicago, United States of America (1998)
- Buffalo, United States of America (1977)
- Kruševac, Serbia (1990)

== Notable people ==
- Adi Nes (born 1966), photographer
- Miri Regev (born 1965), politician and a former Brigadier General. She is a member of the Cabinet as the Minister of Culture and Sport from 2015–2020 and the Minister of Transportation since 2020
- Ronit Barash (born 1977), rabbi and preacher
- Miki Zohar (born 1980), politician. He is a former member of the Kiryat Gat City Council, a member of Knesset from 2015 to 2023, and a member of Cabinet as the Minister of Culture and Sport since 2022.
- Ninet Tayeb (born 1983), singer and actress

== See also ==
- Kefar Shihlayim
