= Ashdod =

City in Israel

Coordinates: 31°48′0″N 34°39′0″E

Ashdod אַשְׁדּוֹד (Hebrew) أسدود (Arabic)
- City

Hebrew transcription(s)
  - ISO 259: ʔašdod
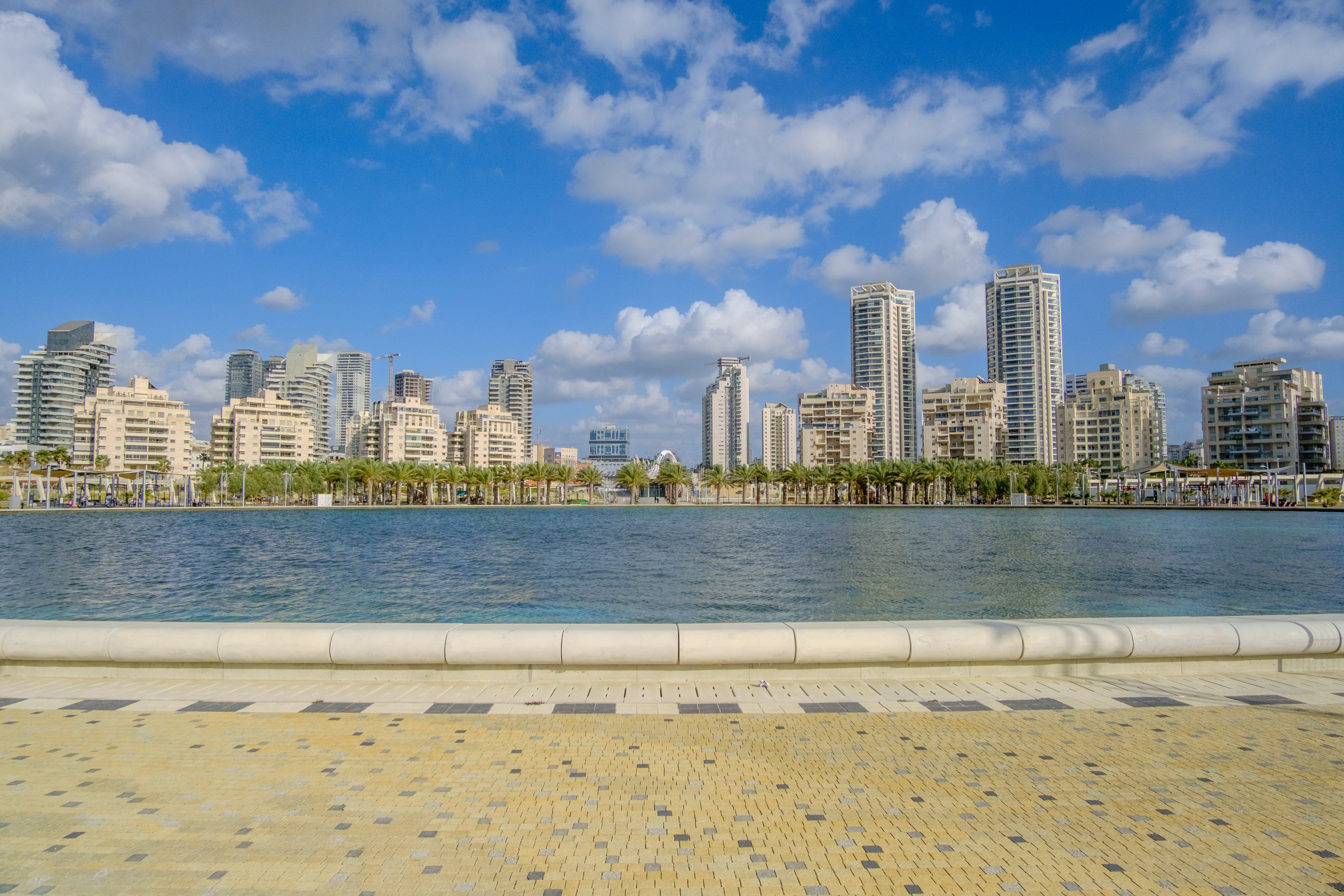
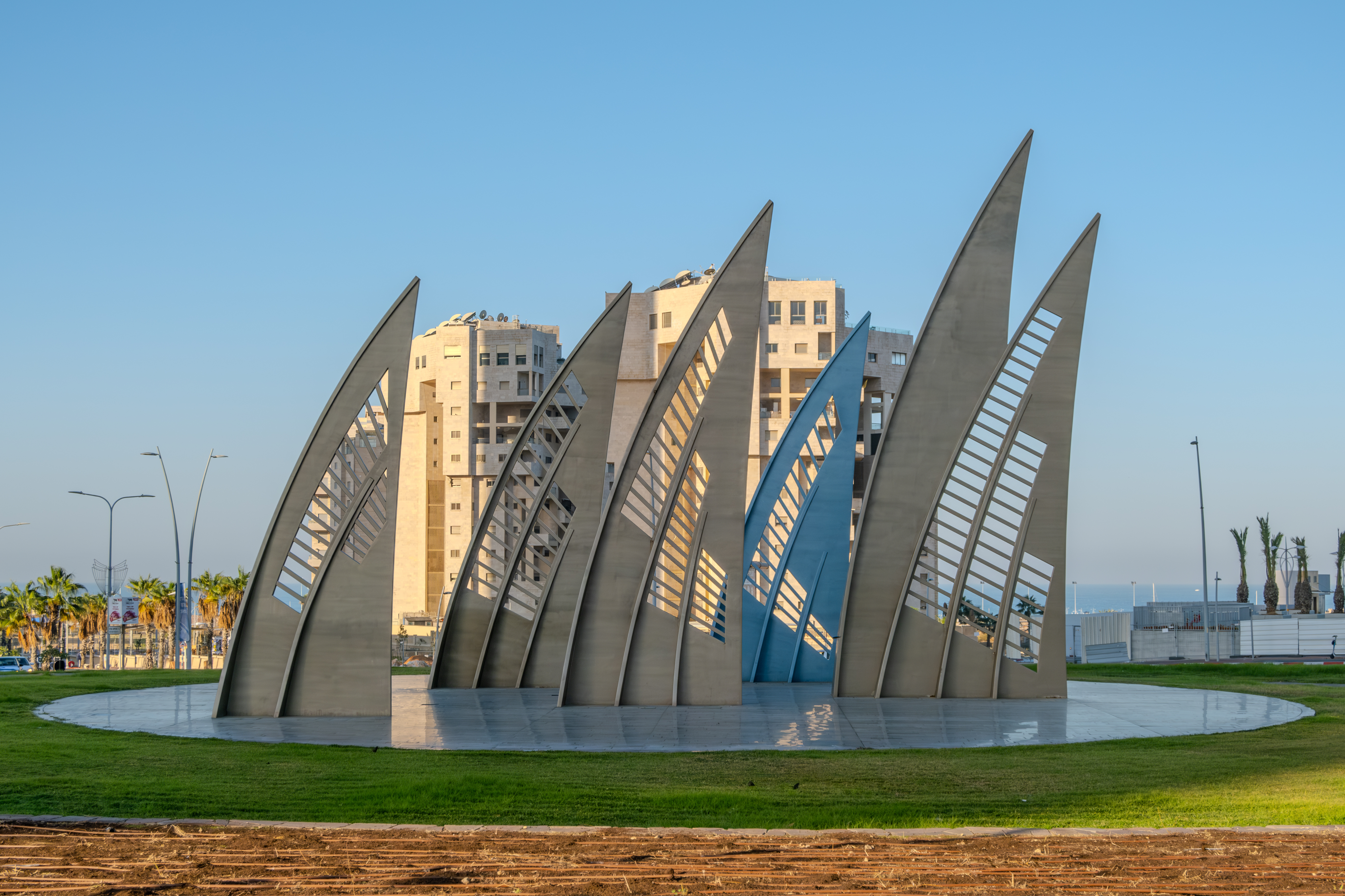
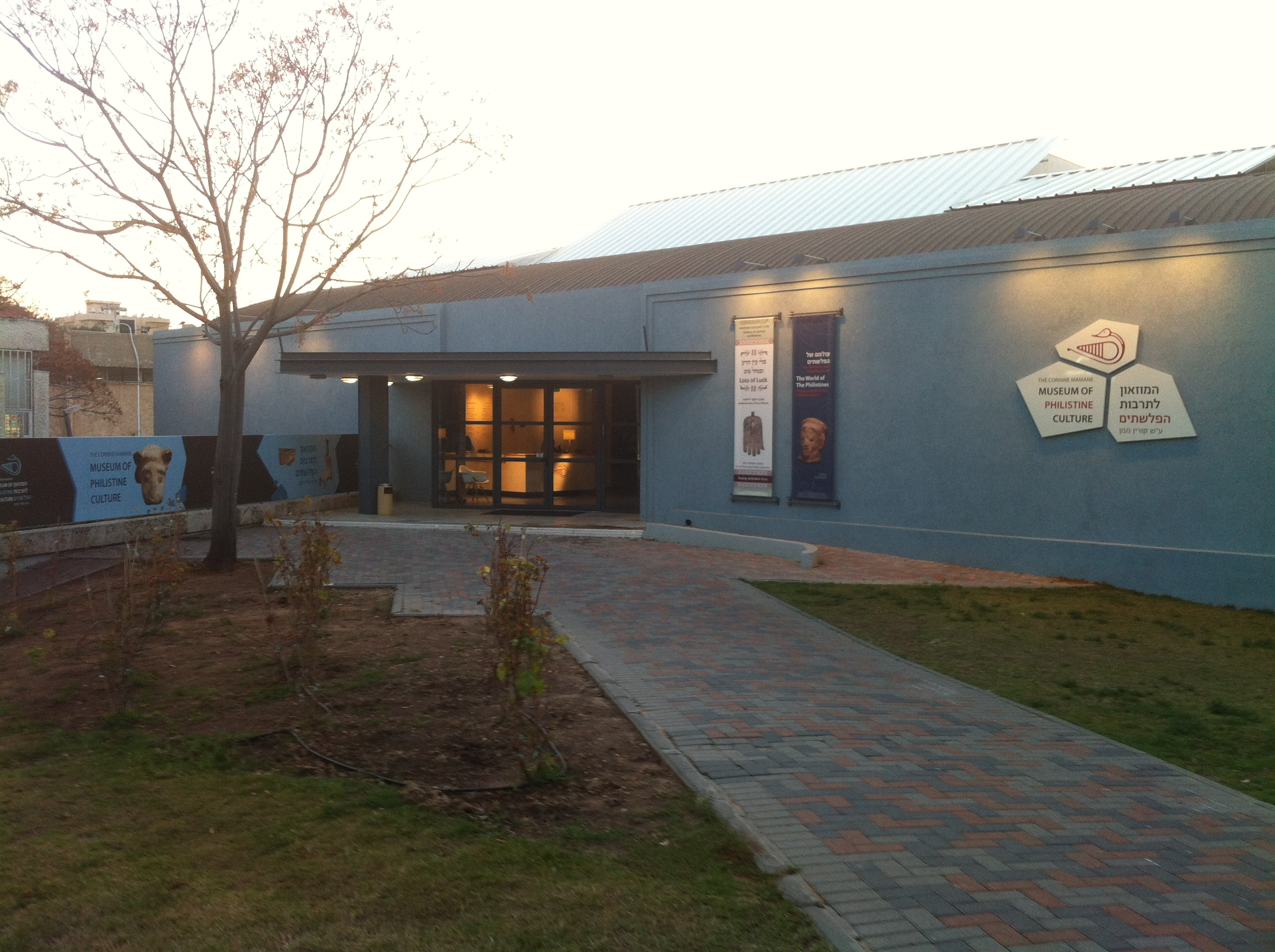
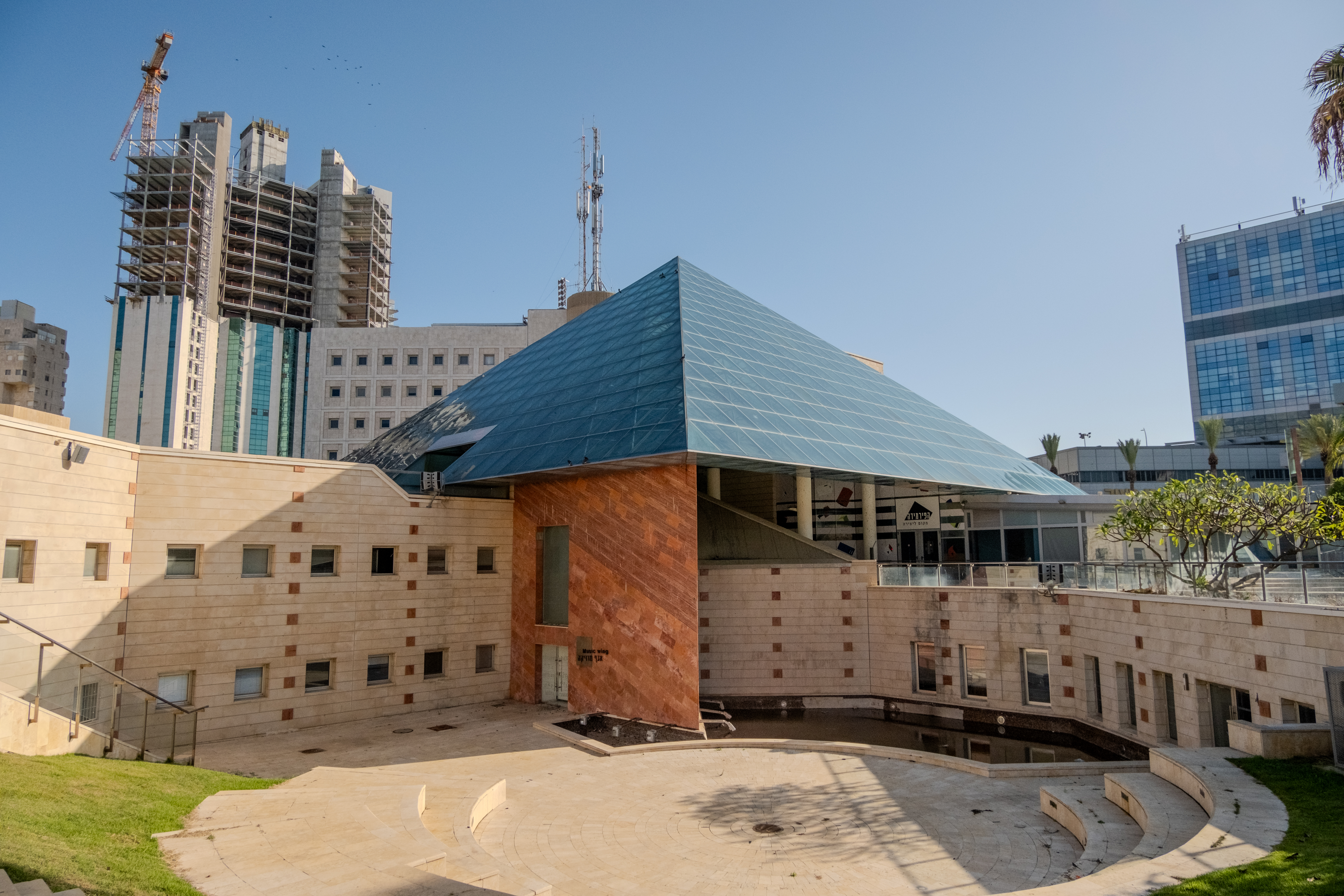
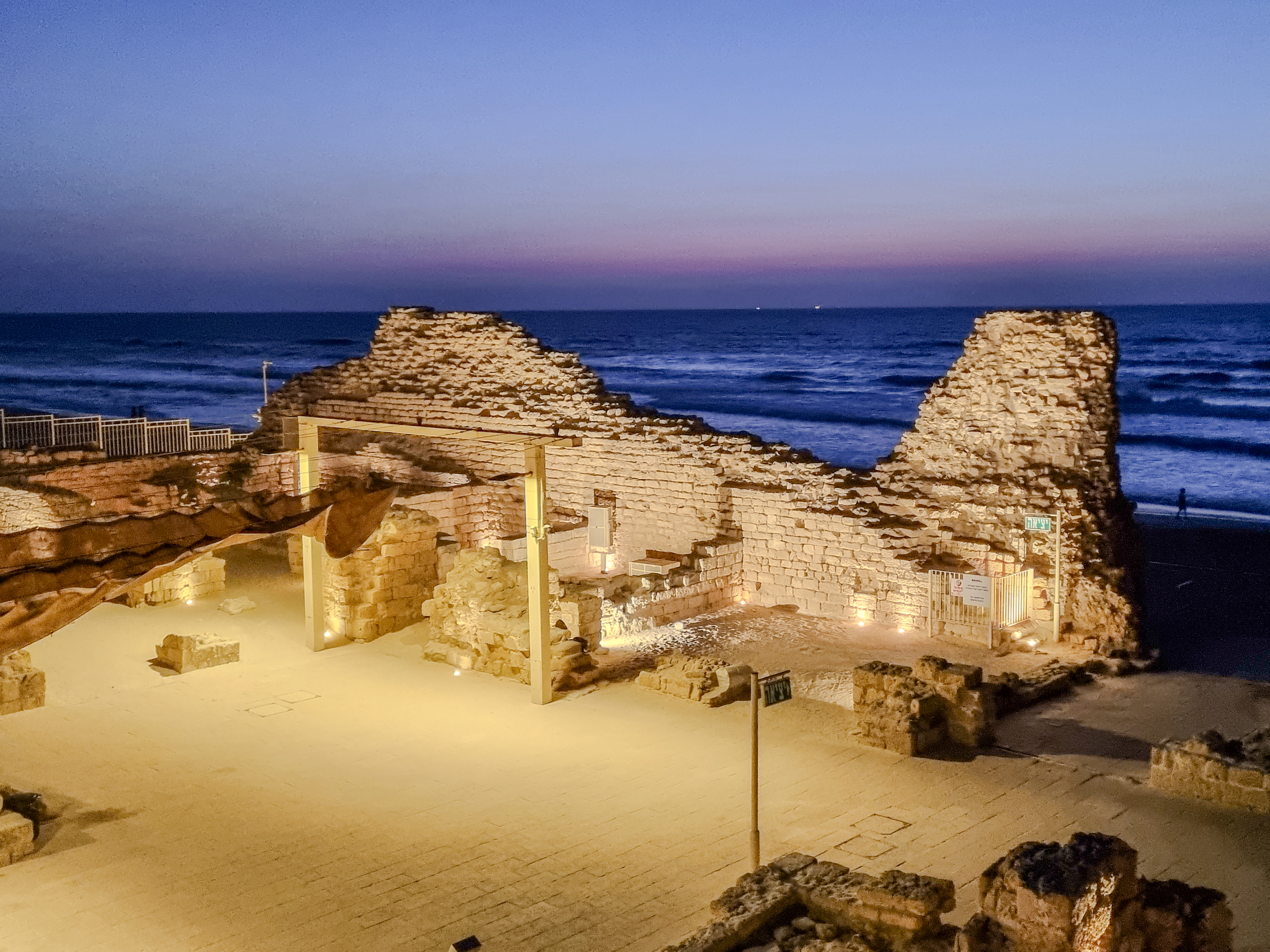
- Ashdod skyline Sails Square Museum of Philistine Culture Ashdod Museum of Art Ashdod-Yam

- Flag Coat of arms
- Interactive map of Ashdod
- Location within Ashkelon region of Israel Location within Israel
- Country: Israel
- District: Southern
- Subdistrict: Ashkelon
- Founded: 1956 (Israeli city)

Government
  - Type: Mayor–council
  - Body: Municipality of Ashdod
  - Mayor: Yehiel Lasri (Likud)

Area
  - Total: 47,242 dunams (47.242 km^{2}; 18.240 sq mi)

Population (2024)
  - Total: 228,562
  - Density: 4,838.1/km^{2} (12,531/sq mi)
- Demonym: Ashdodian
- Time zone: UTC+2 (IST)
  - Summer (DST): UTC+3 (IDT)
- Website: ashdod.muni.il

Ashdod (Hebrew: אַשְׁדּוֹד, romanized: ʾašdōḏ, pronounced [ʔaʃˈdod]; Arabic: أسدود, romanized: ʾasdūd, pronounced [ʔasˈduːd], or إسدود, ʾisdūd [ʔɪsˈduːd]; Philistine: 𐤀𐤔𐤃𐤃, romanized: *ʾašdūd) is the sixth-largest city in Israel. Located in the country's Southern District, it lies on the Mediterranean coast 32 kilometres (20 miles) south of Tel Aviv and 20 km (12 mi) north of Ashkelon. Ashdod's port is the largest in Israel, handling 60% of the country's imported goods.

Modern Ashdod was established in 1956 on the sand hills 6 kilometers northwest of the ancient city of Ashdod, known in modern times by its Arabic name Isdud. Isdud had been depopulated during the 1948 Arab–Israeli War, having had a history spanning approximately 3,700 years. In ancient times, ancient Ashdod developed as an active maritime trade center, with its ports identified at Ashdod-Yam and Tel Mor. In biblical times, it was one of the five principal cities of the Philistines.

Ashdod has absorbed extensive immigration from around the world, resulting in one of the highest percentages of new immigrants in Israel. The city is home to the largest Moroccan and Karaite Jewish communities in Israel, and to the largest Georgian Jewish community in the world. According to the Israel Central Bureau of Statistics (CBS), Ashdod had a population of 228,562 in 2024, with an area of 47,242 dunams (47.242 km^{2}; 18.240 sq mi). Ashdod was incorporated as a city in 1968, with a land-area of approximately 60 square kilometres (23 sq mi).

The Ashdod Natural Region is coextensive with the city of Ashdod, the only natural region in Israel that is coextensive with its largest city.

== History ==
=== Stone Age ===
Three stone tools dating from the Neolithic era were discovered, with no other evidence of a Stone Age settlement in Ashdod found, suggesting that the tools were deposited there in a later period.

=== Historical Ashdod and Ashdod-Yam ===
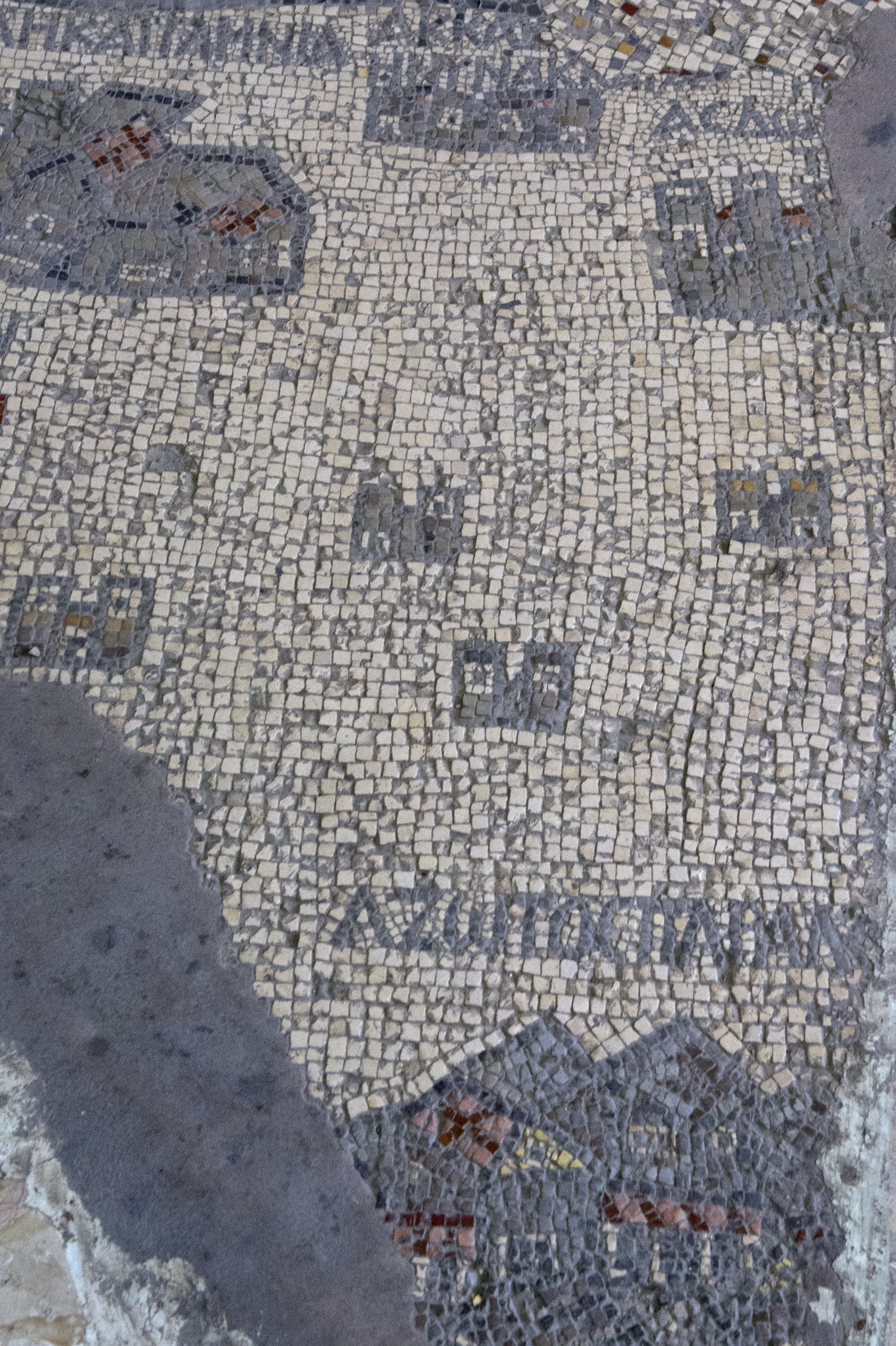
The Madaba Map, showing the two cities of ΑϹΔⲰ... / ASDŌ... / Asdod (Tel Ashdod) and ΑΖⲰΤΟϹΠΑΡΑΛ[ΙΟϹ] / AZŌTOSPARAL[IOS] / Azotus-by-the-Sea (Ashdod-Yam)

The historical town of Ashdod (today referred to as Tel Ashdod / Isdud), was c. 6 km southeast of the center of the modern town. It dates to the 17th century BCE, and was a prominent Philistine city, one of the five Philistine city-states. The coastal site of Ashdod-Yam, today southwest of the modern city, was a separate city for most of its history.

The first documented urban settlement at Tel Ashdod dates to the 17th century BCE, when it was a fortified Canaanite city. It was destroyed at the end of the Late Bronze Age.

During the Iron Age, it was a prominent Philistine city, one of the five Philistine city-states. It is mentioned 13 times in the Hebrew Bible. After being captured by Judean King Uzziah in 760 BCE, it was ruled by the Kingdom of Judah before it was taken by the Assyrians. During the Persian period, the Jewish governor Nehemiah condemned the returning Jews for intermarrying with Ashdod's non-Jewish residents. Under Hellenistic rule, the city was known as Azotus. It was later incorporated into the Jewish Hasmonean kingdom in 143 BCE. In 63 BCE, Pompey removed the city from Judean rule and annexed it to the Roman province of Syria. However, in 30 BCE, Ashdod came under Herod the Great's rule when he received the south coast area, including Ashdod, as a gift from Augustus Caesar. Following the death of Herod the Great in 4 BCE, Ashdod (known as Azotus in this period) came under the rule of Jewish queen Salome I, Herod's sister. Salome I ruled over a territory that included the cities of Ashdod (Azotus), Jamnia, and Phasaelis. The Roman emperor Augustus supplemented this with a royal habitation for Salome I at Ashkelon (Ascalon). Ashdod was later a bishopric under Byzantine rule, whose importance gradually slipped until by the Middle Ages it was a village.

Ashdod-Yam, later known as Azotos Paralios, appears to have been first settled in the Bronze Age, gradually gaining in importance through the Iron Age. In the Byzantine period the port town overshadowed in importance the city further inland: the bishops of Azotos present at the council of 325 and the council of Jerusalem in 536 seem to have resided in Azotos Paralios rather than in Azotos Mesogeios. The prominence of Hellenised, then Christian Azotus continued until the 7th century, when it came under Muslim rule. The city was represented at the Council of Chalcedon by Heraclius of Azotus. A coastal fort "Minat al-Qal'a" (lit. 'the port with the castle') was erected by the Umayyad Caliph Abd al-Malik, the builder of the Dome of the Rock, at or near the former Azotus Paralios, which was later reconstructed by the Fatimids and Crusaders. The port city stops being mentioned during the Ayyubid-Mamluk periods, making it likely that it was destroyed due to fears that they might again be used by Crusader invasions from the sea.

=== Ashdod before 1948 ===
Isdud was to be part of the Arab state according to the United Nations Partition Plan for Palestine. Egyptians defending Isdud withdrew in late 1948, causing most of Isdud's roughly 5,000 residents to flee. The 300 townspeople who remained were driven southwards by the Israel Defense Forces (IDF).

Excavations at Tel Mor revealed traces of Late Ottoman infant jar-burials often associated with nomads or itinerant workers of Egyptian origins.

=== Foundation of modern Ashdod ===
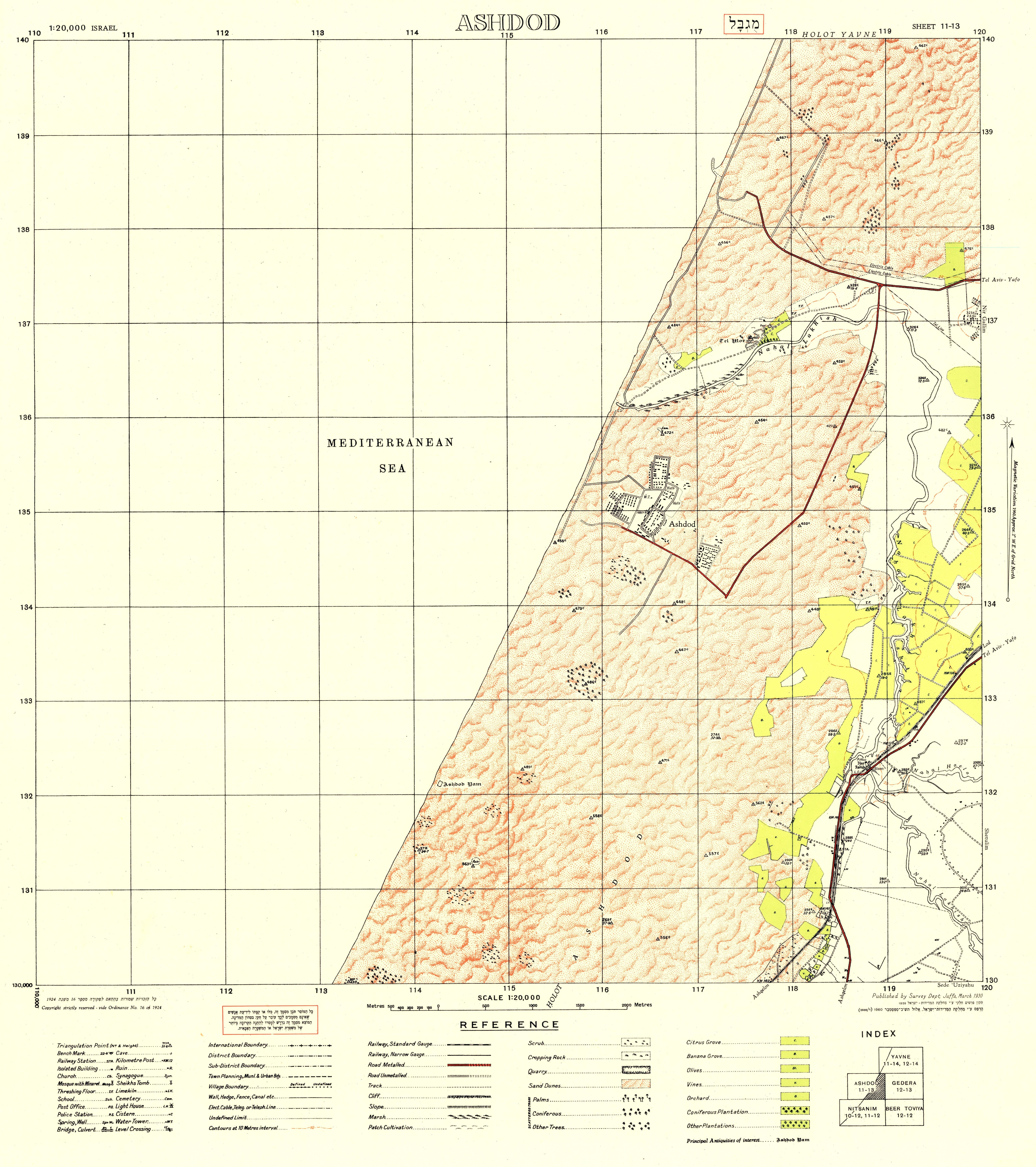
Ashdod in 1960. Historical Isdud is south of the mapped area, shown on the adjacent map here

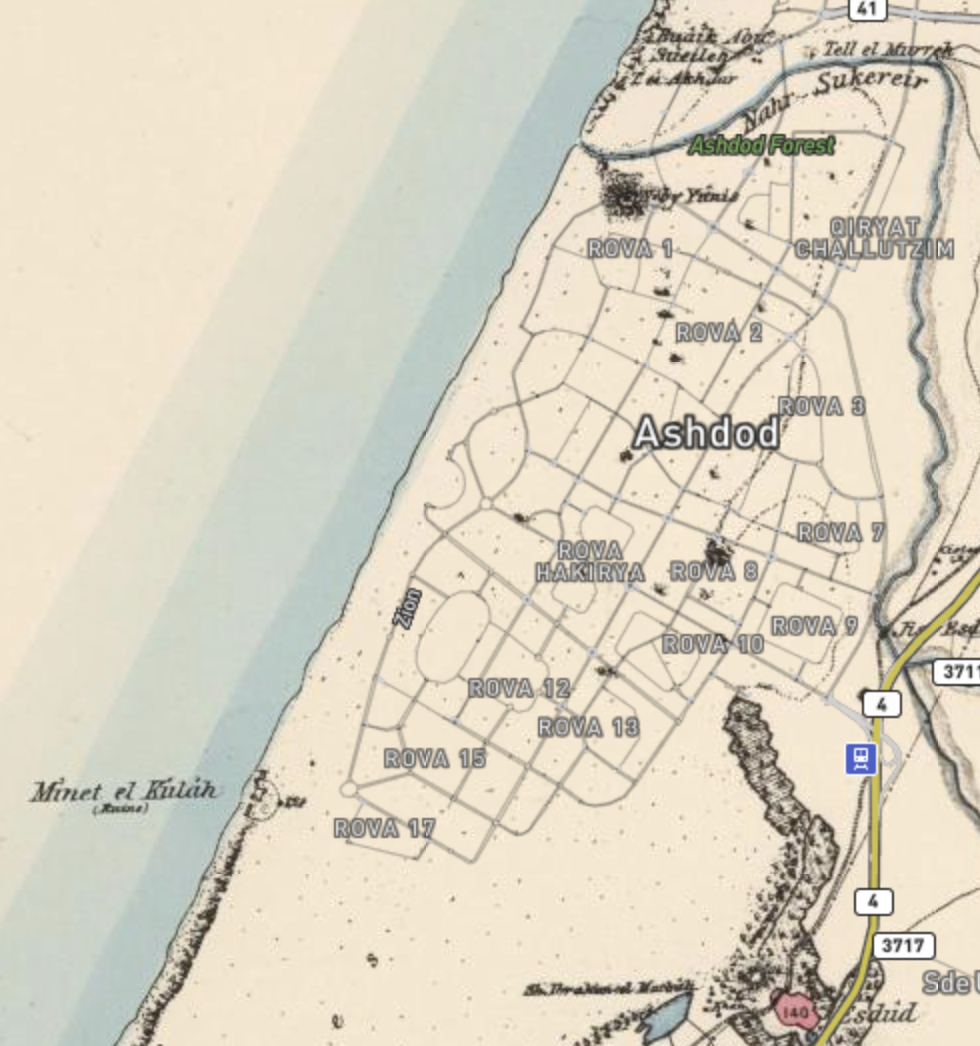
Isdud (Esdud) in 1870 overlaid with the outline of modern Ashdod

Maps comparing the location of historical Isdud (Esdud) and Minet el Kuleh, with modern Ashdod, founded in 1956 c.6km northwest of the ruins of Isdud,

The modern city of Ashdod was founded in 1956. On 1 May 1956, then finance minister Levi Eshkol approved the establishment of the city of Ashdod. "Ashdod Company Ltd.", a daughter company of City-Builders Company Ltd., was created for that purpose by Oved Ben-Ami and Philip Klutznick. The first residents, 22 families from Morocco, arrived in November 1956, followed by a small influx of immigrants from Egypt.

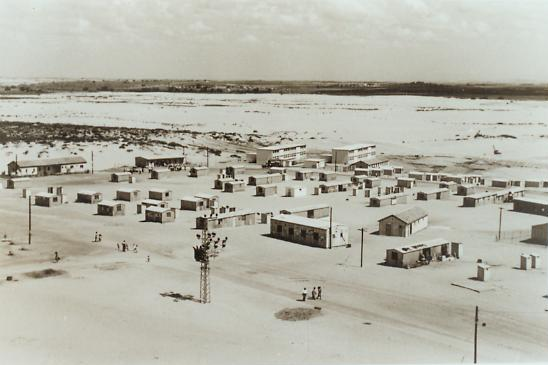
Ashdod in 1957

In July 1957, the government granted a 24 square kilometres (9 square miles), approximately 32 kilometres (20 mi) from Tel Aviv, to the Ashdod Company Ltd., for building the modern city of Ashdod. The building of the Eshkol Power Station in Ashdod was completed in 1958 and included 3 units: 2 units of 50 megawatt, and one unit of 45 megawatt (with sea water desalination capabilities).

The city's development was made possible by the large investment of industrialist Israel Rogosin who opened his main Israeli factory in the city of Ashdod on August 9, 1960. Three of the high schools he funded were also built in Ashdod. The Main boulevard in Ashdod is named in his honour as a founder of the city.

The first local council was appointed in October 1959. Dov Gur was appointed the first local council head on behalf of the Israeli Ministry of Interior. In 1961, Ashdod was a town of 4,600. The Magistrates' Court in the city was inaugurated in 1963. The building of the Port of Ashdod began in April 1961. The port was inaugurated in November 1963, and was first utilized in November 1965, with the coming of the Swedish ship "Wiengelgad". The city expanded gradually, with the construction of two quarters in the 1960s, followed by four more in the 1970s and two more in the 1980s. In 1972, the population was 40,300, and this grew to 65,700 by 1983.

Large-scale growth of the city began in 1991, with the massive arrival of immigrants from the Soviet Union and Ethiopia and infrastructure development. From 1990 to 2001 the city accepted more than 100,000 new inhabitants, a 150% growth. Five more quarters of the city were completed, and a business district was built. In the 2000s, three more quarters and the marina districts were completed. Ashdod was one of six cities that won the 2012 Education Prize awarded by the Israel Ministry of Education.

In 2026, a Cypriot silver-plated metal coin dating from the Persian Empire was discovered on one of Ashdod's beaches. It's the first coin of its kind ever discovered in Israel. Its origin is the ancient city of Salamis, and it suggests maritime and commercial trade between Cyprus and the Land of Israel during that period.

== Demographics ==
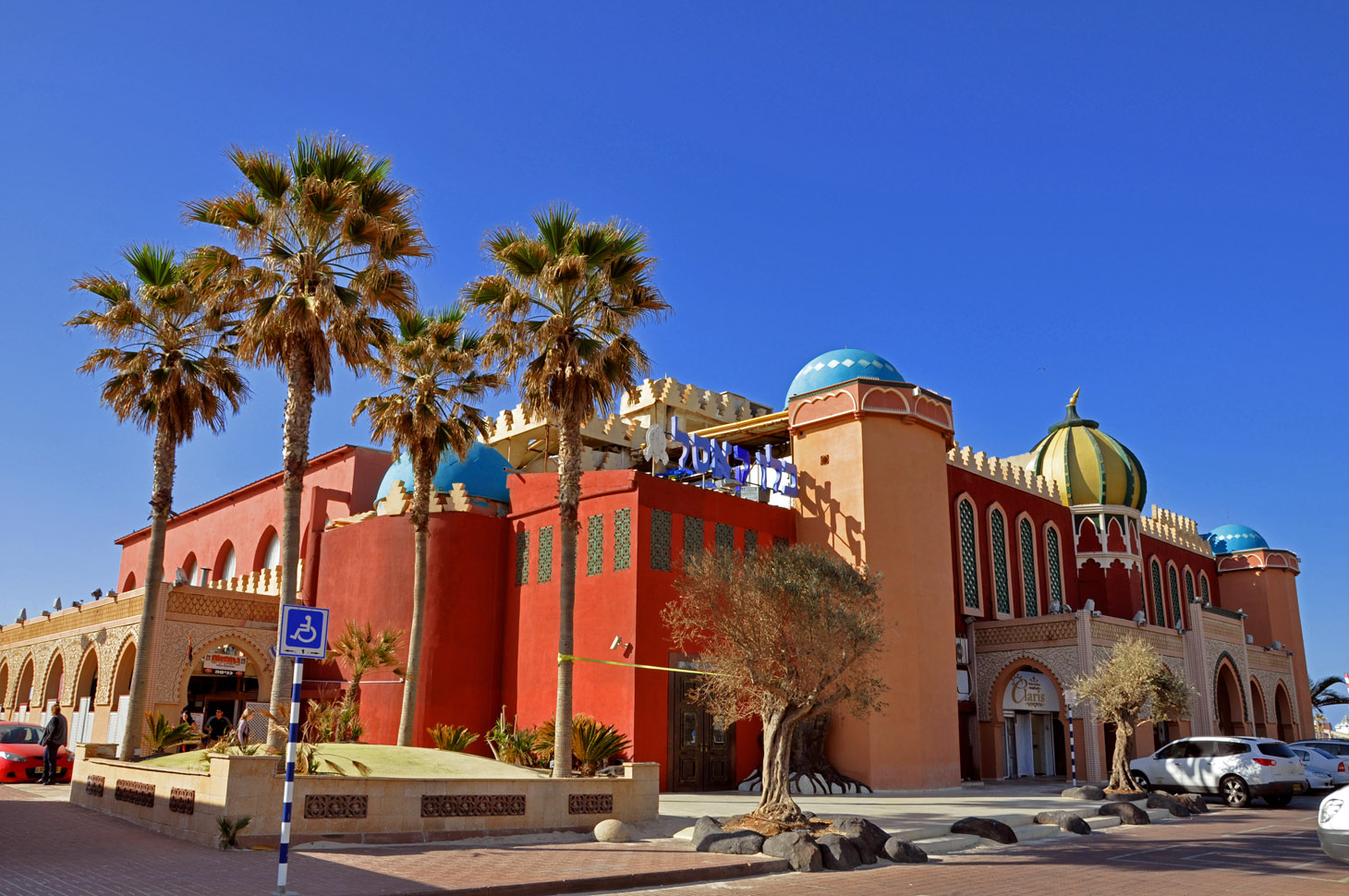
La Mimunia, Moroccan culture center

Historical population
Year	Pop.	±% p.a.
1961	4,600	—
1972	40,300	+21.81%
1983	65,700	+4.54%
1990	83,900	+3.55%
1995	125,820	+8.44%
1996	137,100	+8.97%
2000	174,224	+6.17%
2001	187,000	+7.33%
2003	192,200	+1.38%
2006	204,400	+2.07%
2008	209,200	+1.17%
2016	220,883	+0.68%
2022	227,865	+0.52%
2024	228,562	+0.15%
Sources: 1983: 2003:

According to the Israel Central Bureau of Statistics (CBS), Ashdod had a population of about 228,562 at the end of 2024, making it the sixth largest city in Israel. The annual population growth rate is 2.6% and the ratio of women to men is 1,046 to 1,000. The population age distribution was recorded as 19.7% under the age of 10, 15.7% from age 10 to 19, 14.9% from 20 to 29, 19.1% from 30 to 44, 19.1% from 45 to 64, and 11.3% were 65 or older.

The population of Ashdod is significantly younger than the Israeli average because of the large number of young couples living in the city. The city is ranked medium-low in socio-economic grading, with a rating of 4 out of 10. 56.1% of 12th grade students in Ashdod were eligible for matriculation certificates in 2000. The average salary in 2000 was NIS 4,821 compared to the national average of NIS 6,835.

=== Immigrant absorption ===
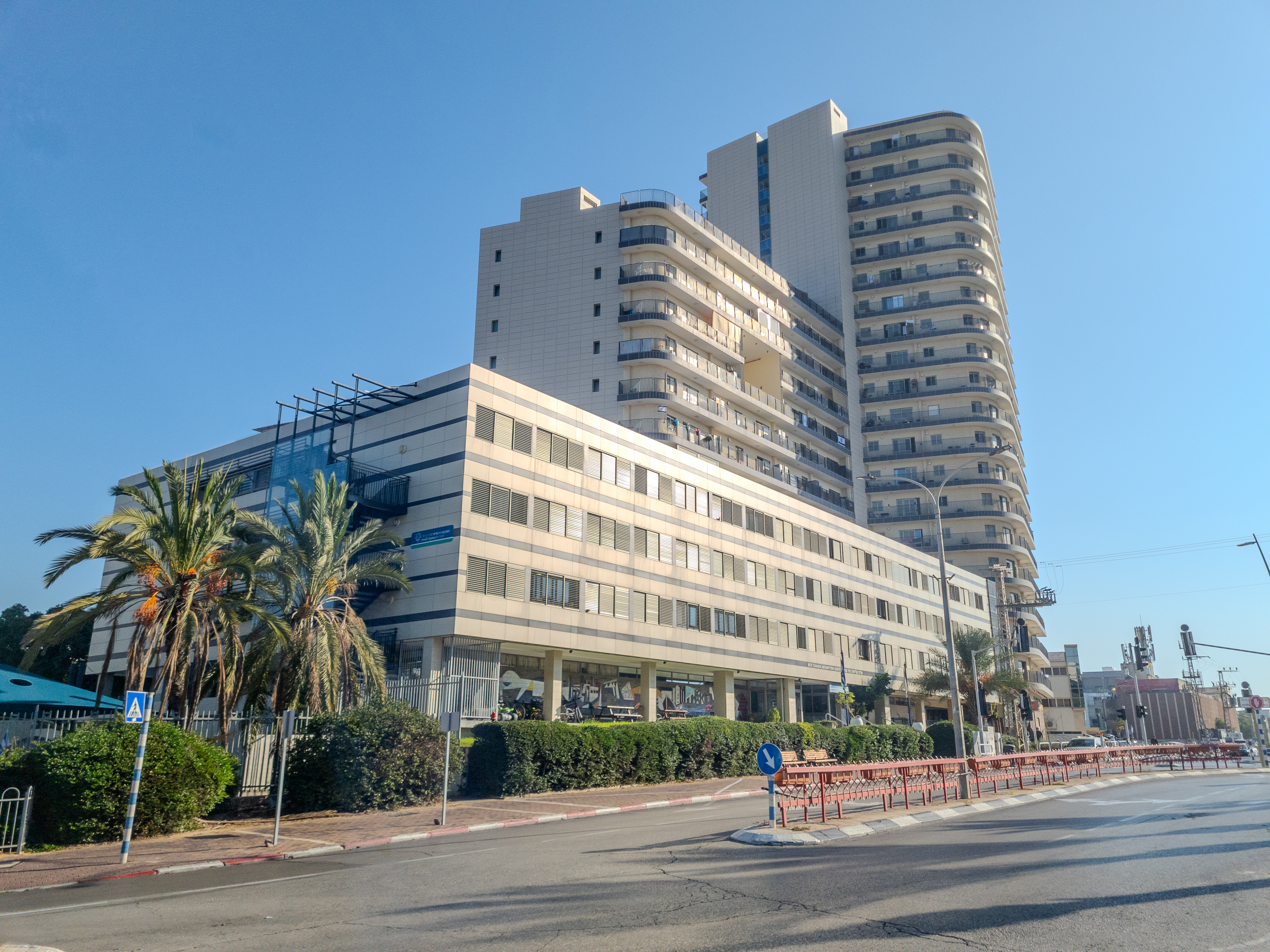
Beit Canada Absorption Center

Ashdod has seen much of its growth as the result of absorption of immigrants from around the world. The first residents were immigrants from Morocco and Egypt. In the 1960s Ashdod accepted a large number of immigrants from Romania, followed by a large number from Georgia (then part of the Soviet Union) in the 1970s. More than 60,000 Russians who immigrated to Israel in the 1990s following the collapse of the Soviet Union settled in Ashdod. Recent demographic figures suggest that about 32% of the city's population are new immigrants, 85% of whom are originally from the former Soviet Union.

During the 1990s the city absorbed a large number of immigrants from Ethiopia, and in more recent years Ashdod absorbed a large number of immigrants from the United States, United Kingdom, France, Argentina, and South Africa. Many of the 60,000 Marathi-speaking Bene Israel from Maharashtra, India who moved to Israel also settled there. Ashdod also receives a significant amount of internal migration, especially from the Gush Dan metropolitan area.

=== Religion ===
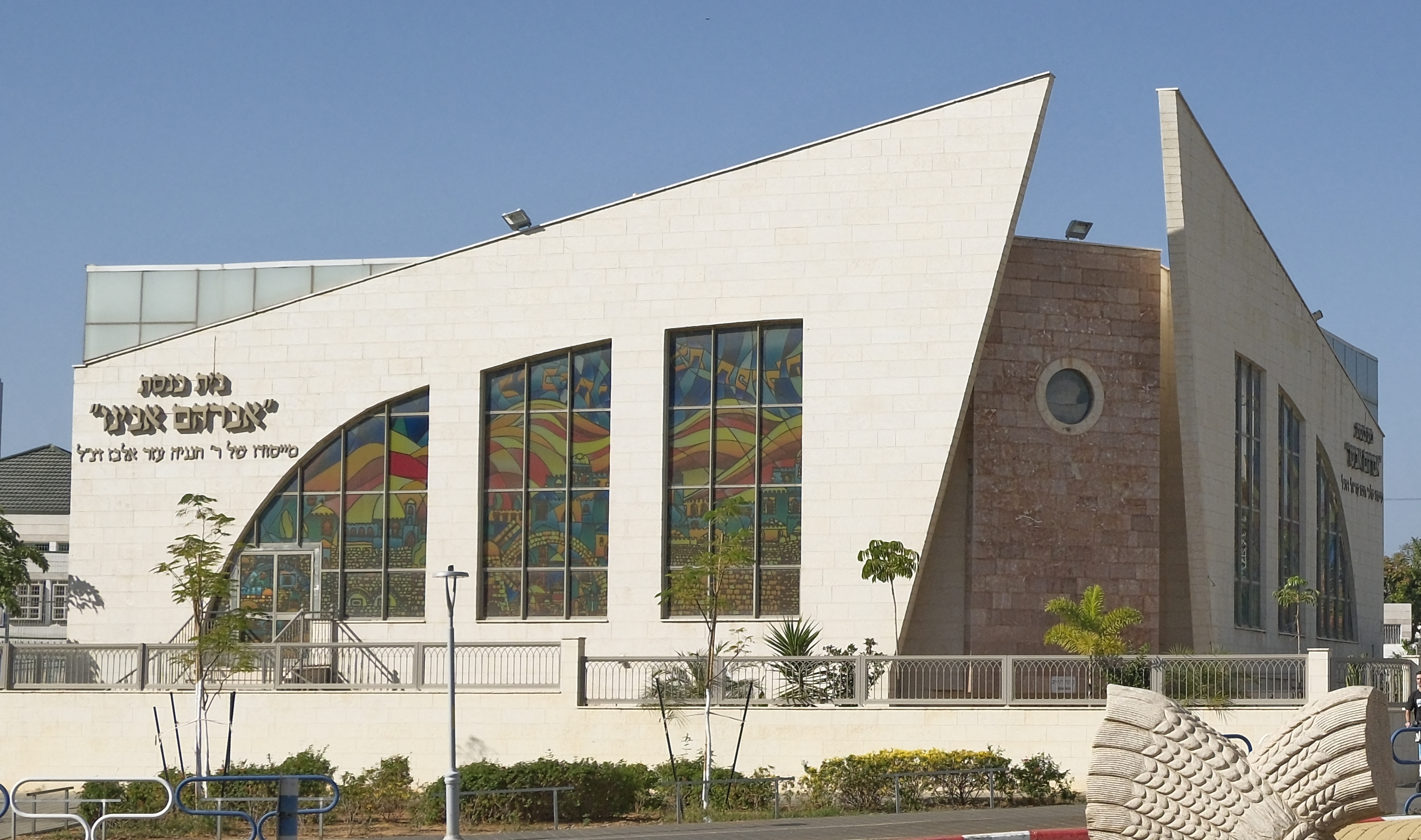
Avraham Avinu Synagogue

Over 95% of Ashdod's population is Jewish, while over 30% of Ashdod's population is Haredi. The Haredi population has been growing in Ashdod, and Haredi children make up the majority in the city's schools. The rapidly increasing Haredi population has caused some social and community tensions, particularly regarding the city's character, Mayor Yehiel Lasri levying fines against retail stores if they are open on Shabbat, and growing community tensions with secular Russian Jews.

Despite this, the city is generally secular, although most of the non-Jewish population is a result of mixed marriages. About 100 families are affiliated with the Pittsburg Hasidic group, established there in 1969 by Grand Rabbi Avraham Abba Leifer and continued today by his son, Grand Rabbi Mordechai Yissachar Ber Leifer. Ashdod has many synagogues serving different streams of Judaism. The city is also home to the world's largest Karaite community, about five thousand strong. There is also a Scandinavian Seamen Protestant church, established by Norwegian Righteous Among the Nations pastor Per Faye-Hansen.

=== Health ===
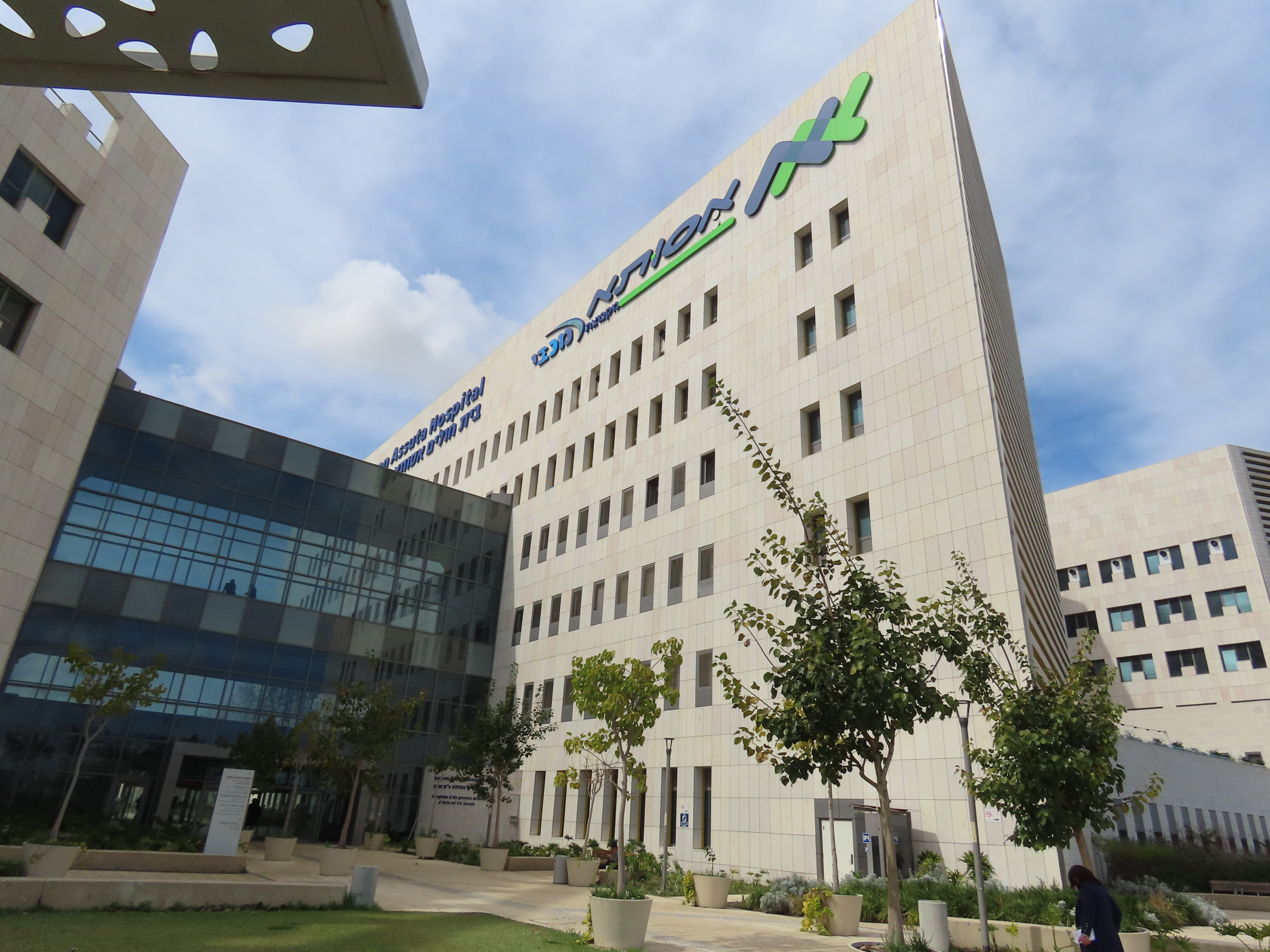
Assuta Ashdod Medical Center

Assuta Ashdod Medical Center, Ashdod's only general hospital, serves the city and the surrounding area. It is a 300-bed hospital, and its "bomb shelter" design with thick concrete walls offers sufficient protection so as to keep operating without having to transfer patients during a time of war. It is also a university hospital affiliated with Ben-Gurion University of the Negev. The hospital opened in 2017. Prior to the opening of the hospital, Ashdod did not have a general hospital, and residents in need of hospitalization had to travel to Kaplan Medical Center in Rehovot or Barzilai Medical Center in Ashkelon.

There are public and private clinics operating in the city. A special clinic run by Hatzalah operates at times when all other clinics in the city are closed.

=== Education ===
In 2013, Ashdod had 500 schools employing 3,500 teachers. The student population was 55,000. The city's education budget was NIS 418 million shekels.

== Urban development ==
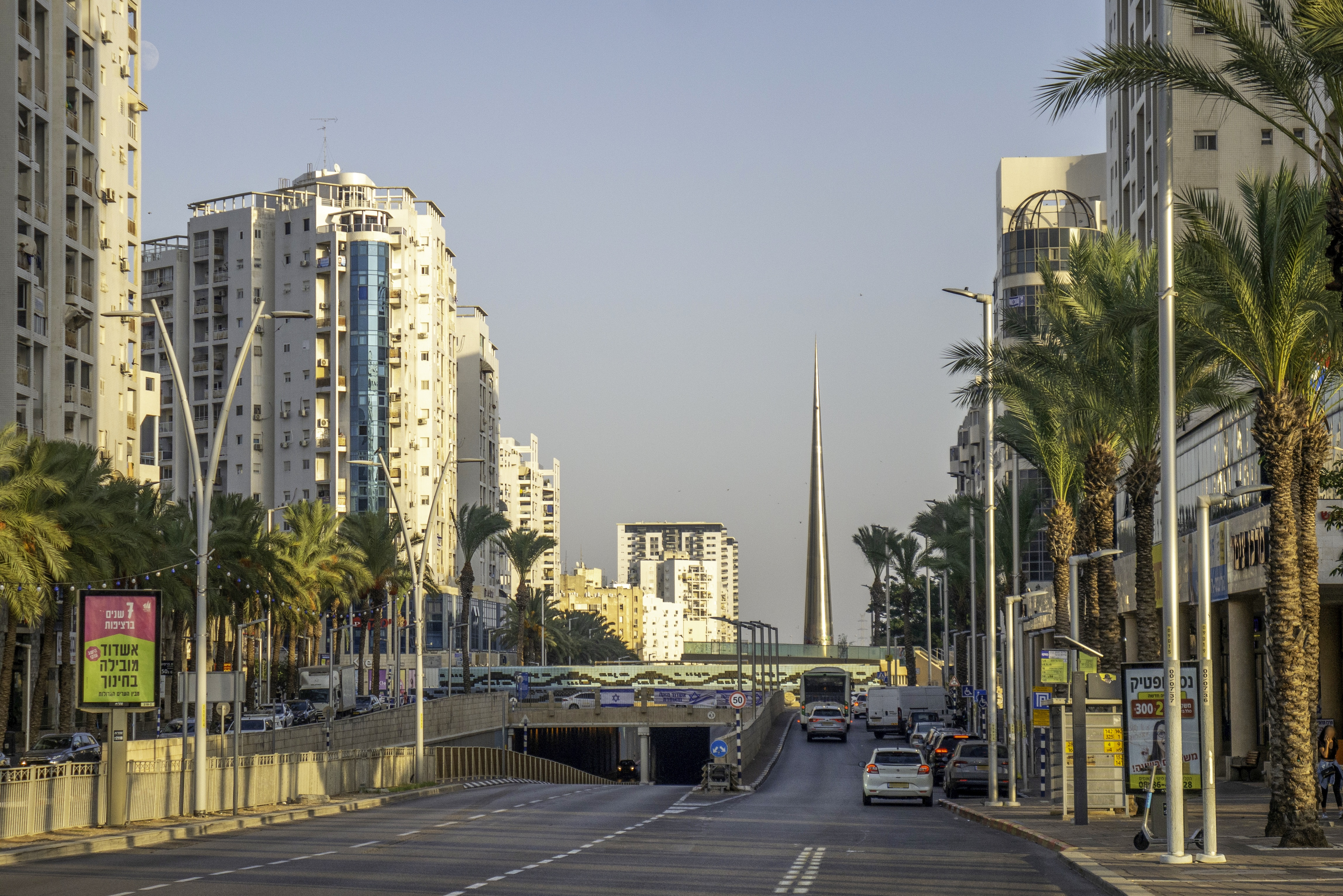
Menachem Begin Boulevard

The modern city of Ashdod city was built outside the historic settlement site in Rimal Isdud. The development followed a main development plan. The planners divided the city into seventeen neighborhoods of ten to fifteen thousand people. Wide avenues between the neighborhoods make traffic flow relatively freely inside the city. Each neighborhood has access to its own commercial center, urban park, and health and education infrastructure. The original plan also called for a business and administrative center, built in the mid-1990s, when the city population grew rapidly more than doubling in ten years.

Three industrial zones were placed adjacent to the port in the northern part of the city, taking into account the prevailing southern winds which take air pollution away from the city. The plan had its problems, including asymmetric growth of upscale and poorer neighborhoods and the long-time lack of a main business and administrative center.

The city was planned for a maximum of 250,000 inhabitants, and an additional area in the south was reserved for further development.

In 2012, a plan to build an industrial zone on part of the Ashdod Sand Dune was approved. The plan calls for a hi-tech industrial park, events halls, and coffee shops to be built adjacent to the train station. It will cover 400 dunams (0.4 km^{2}; 0.2 sq mi), including 130 dunams of built-up space, with the rest of the area being preserved as a nature reserve. In addition, the Port of Ashdod is undergoing a massive expansion program.

The Ashdod-Nitzanim sand dune nature reserve is a 20-kilometer (12-mile) stretch of sand dunes on the southern outskirts of Ashdod.

== Climate ==
Ashdod has a Mediterranean climate with hot summers, and cool, rainy winters. As a seaside town, the humidity tends to be high frequently and year round, and rain occurs mainly from November to March. In winter, temperatures seldom drop below 5 °C (41 °F) and are more likely to be in the range of 10–15 °C (50–59 °F), while in summer the average is 27 °C (81 °F). The average annual rainfall is 510 mm (20.1 in).

== Economy ==
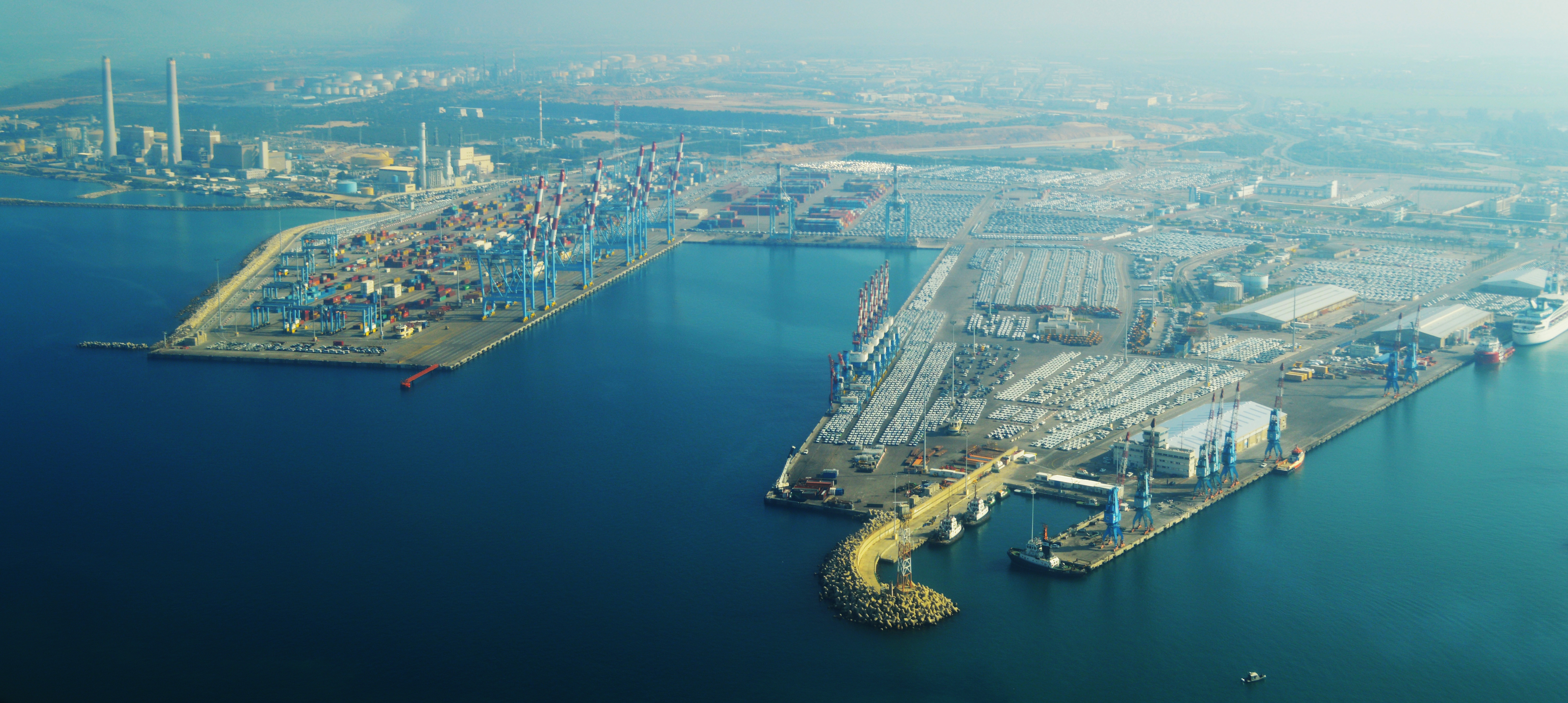
Port of Ashdod

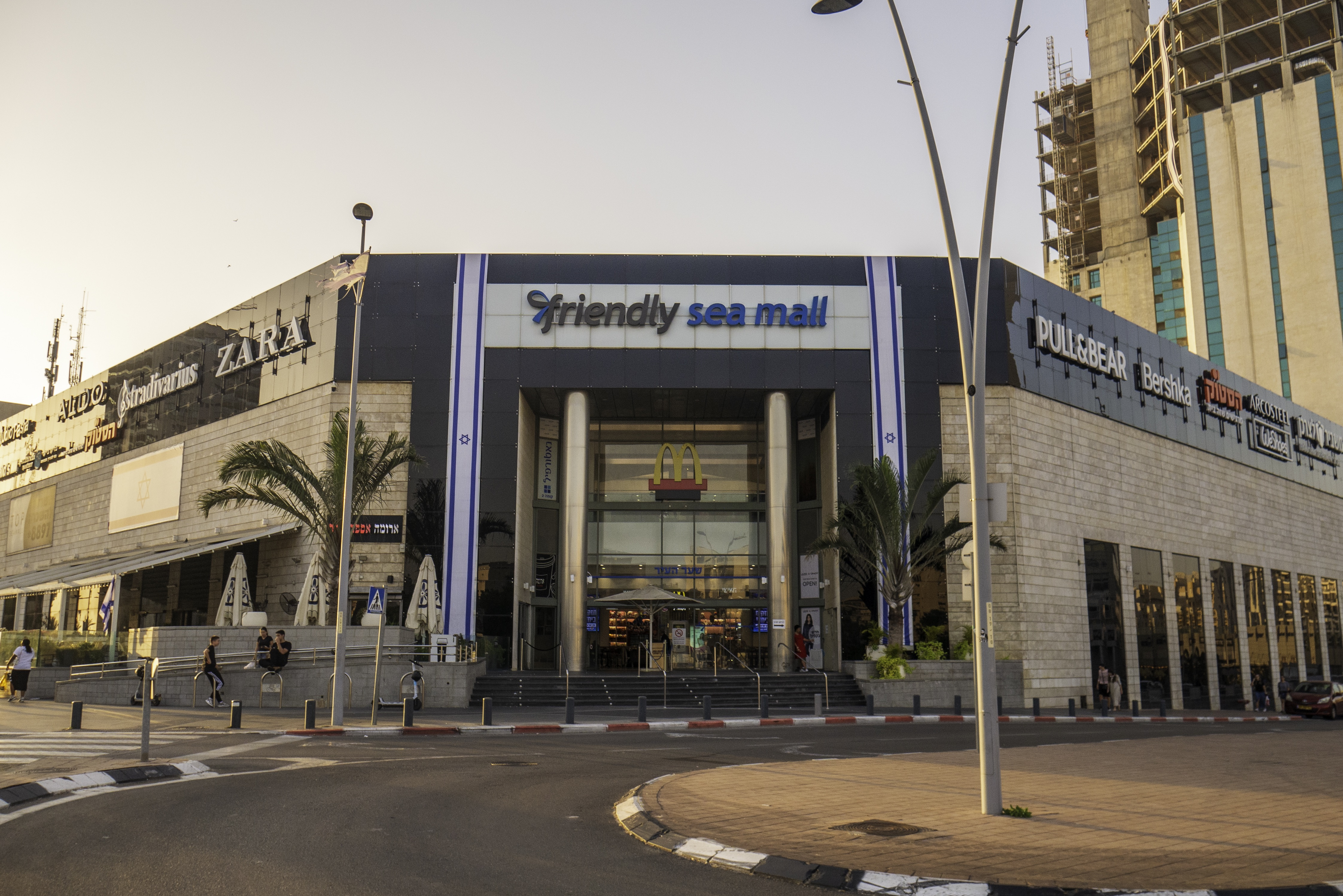
Ashdod Sea Mall

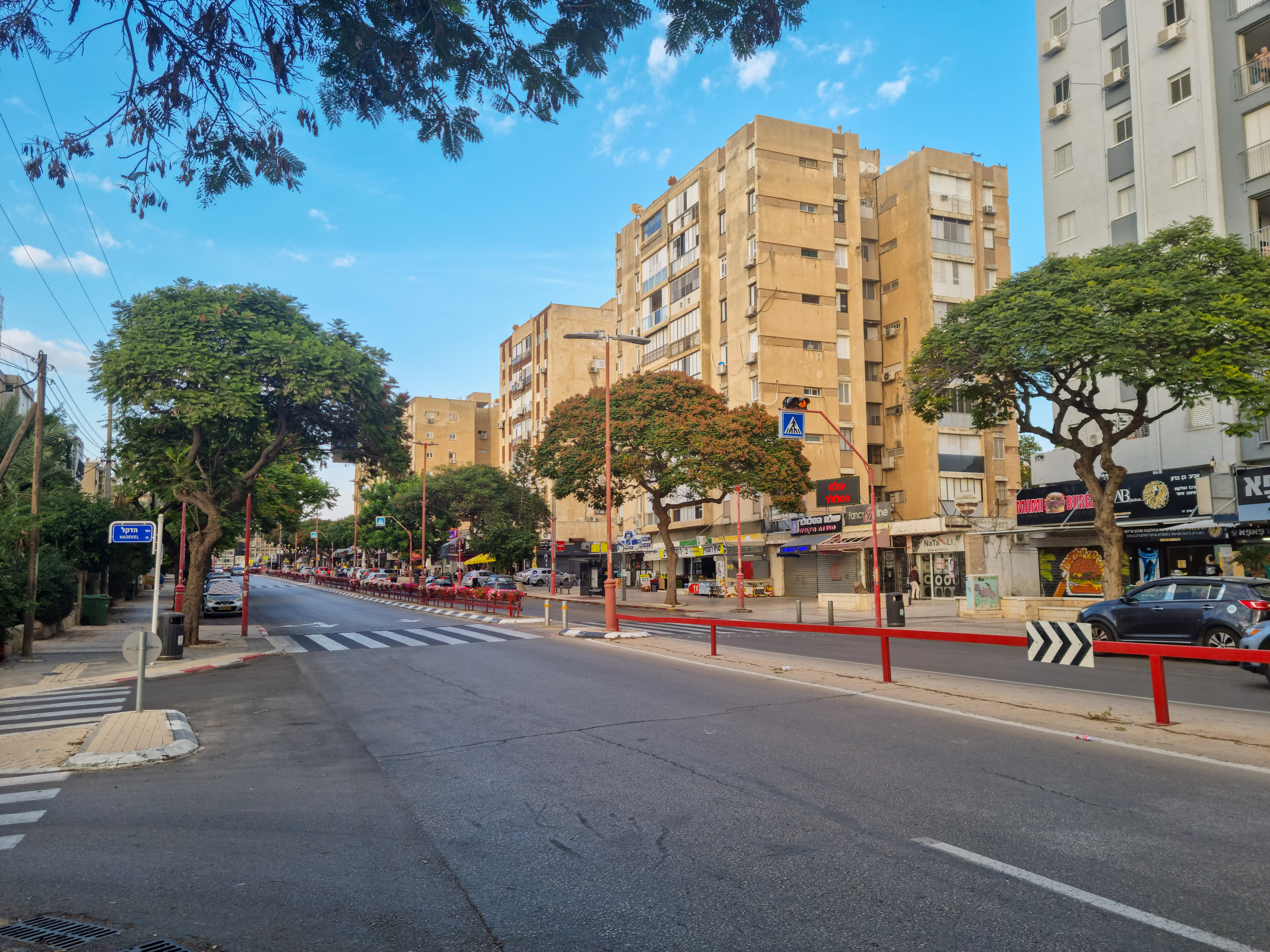
Rogozin street, Rova Alef — former main "city square" before the rise of Rova HaKirya

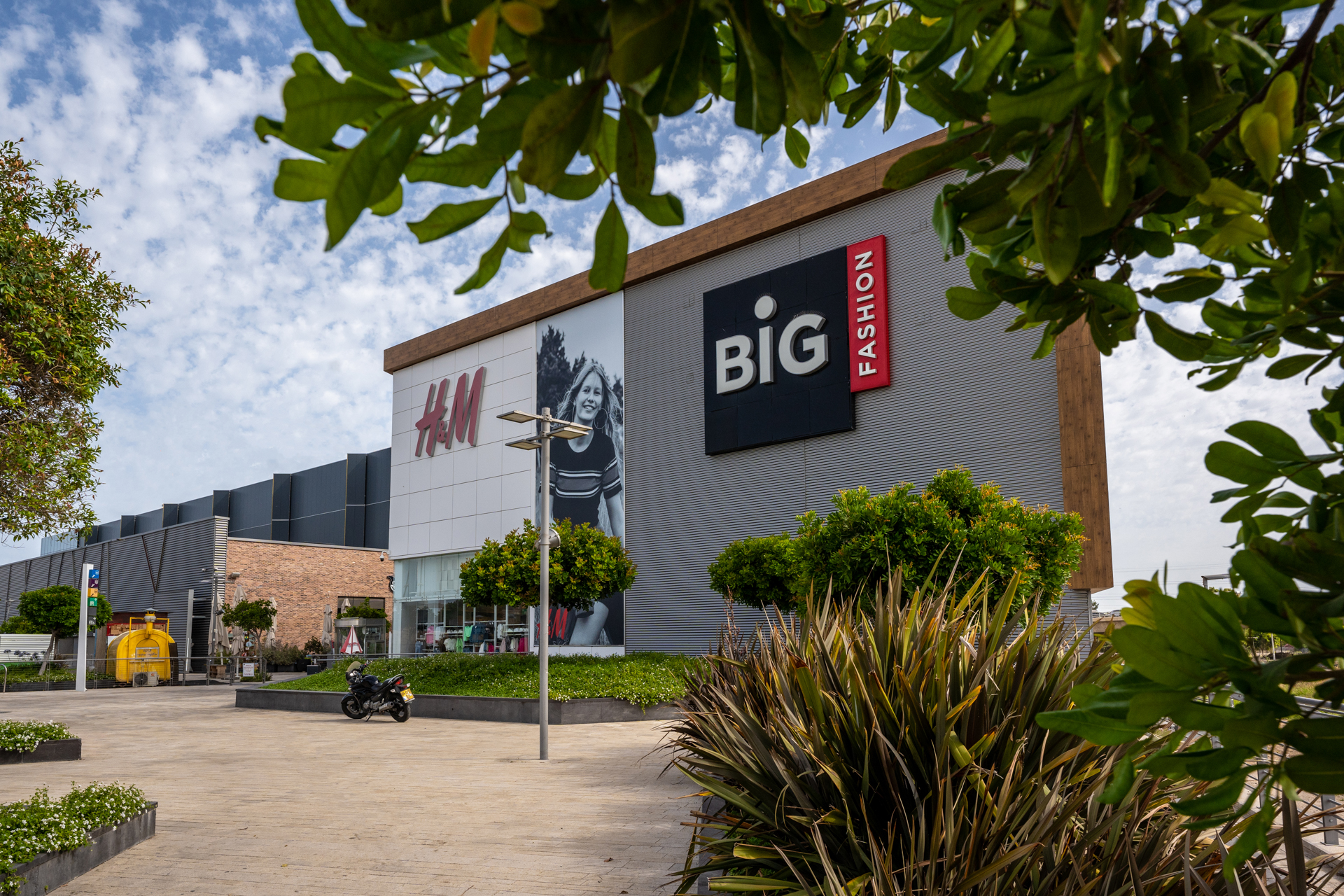
BIG Fashion, Ashdod's biggest shopping mall

Ashdod is one of the most important industrial centers in Israel. All industrial activities in the city are located in northern areas such as the port area, the northern industrial zone, and around the Lachish River. The port of Ashdod is the largest port in Israel, handling about 60% of Israel's port cargo. It was mainly upgraded in recent years and will be able to provide berths for Panamax ships..

== Transportation ==
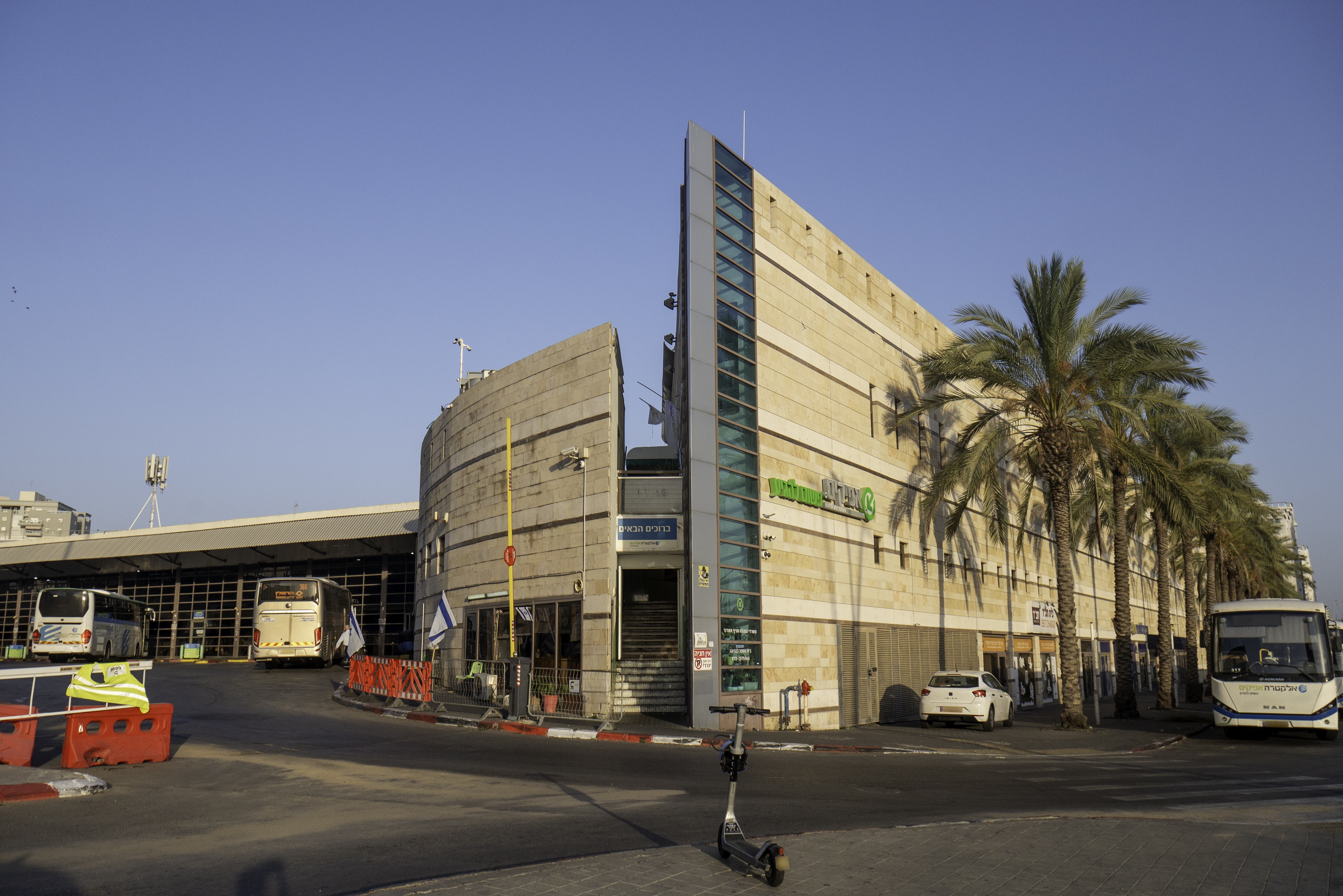
Ashdod central bus station

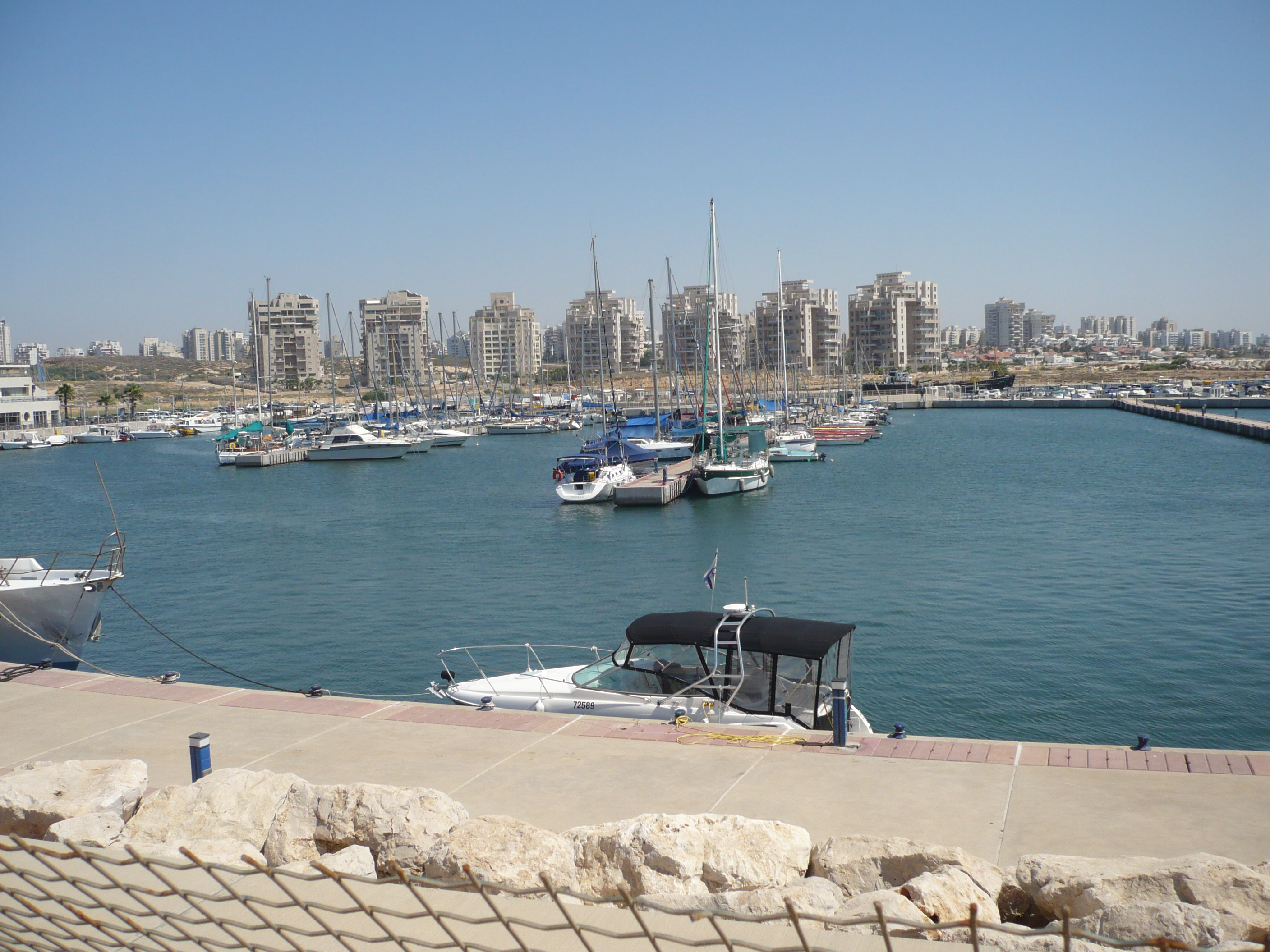
Ashdod Marina

=== Road ===
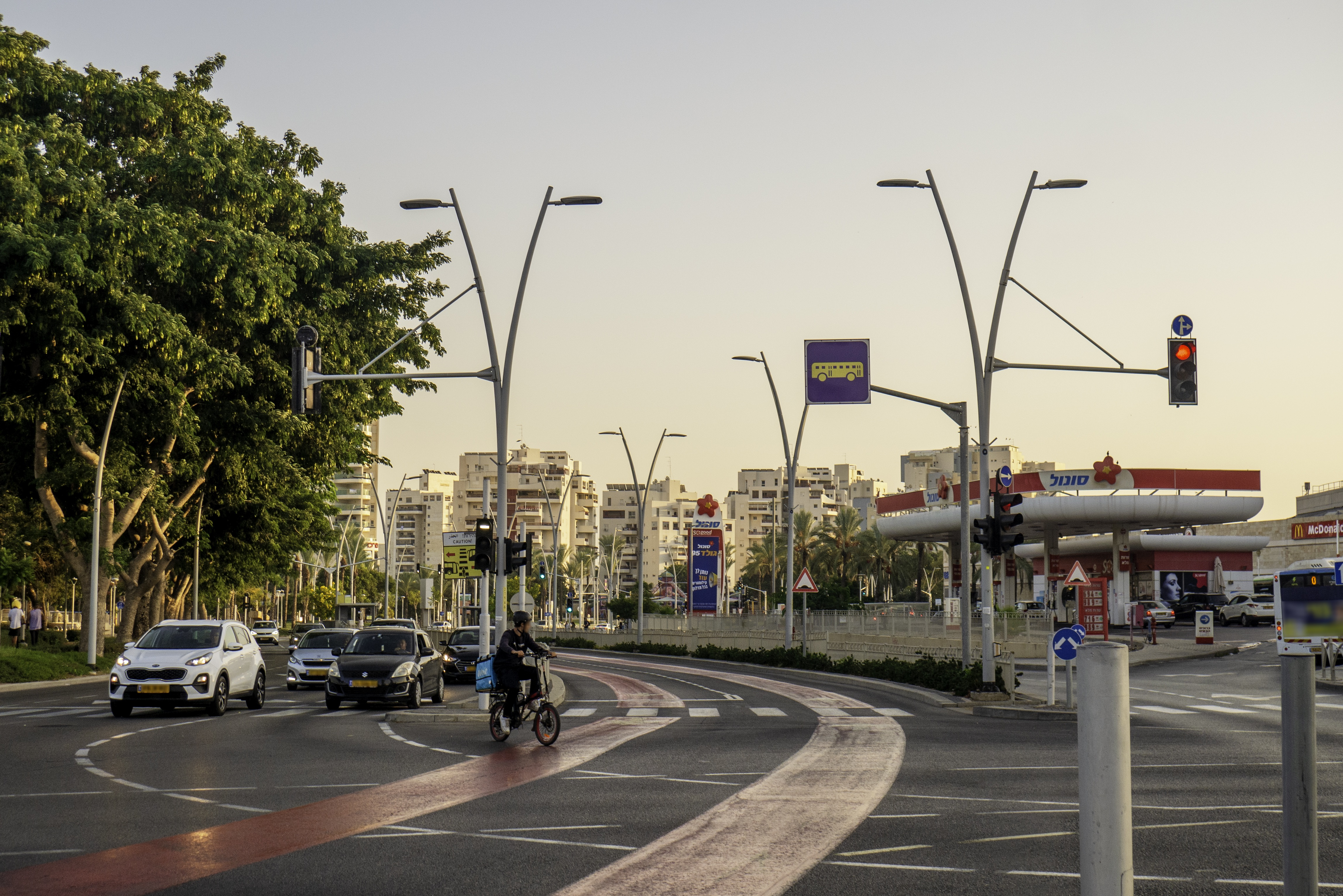
Bus lanes in Herzl boulevard, Rova HaKirya

Ashdod is located on the historic Via Maris. Highway 4 was developed following this route along the southern sea shore of Israel; it serves as the main connection to the north. The other main road in the area is Highway 41.

=== Train ===
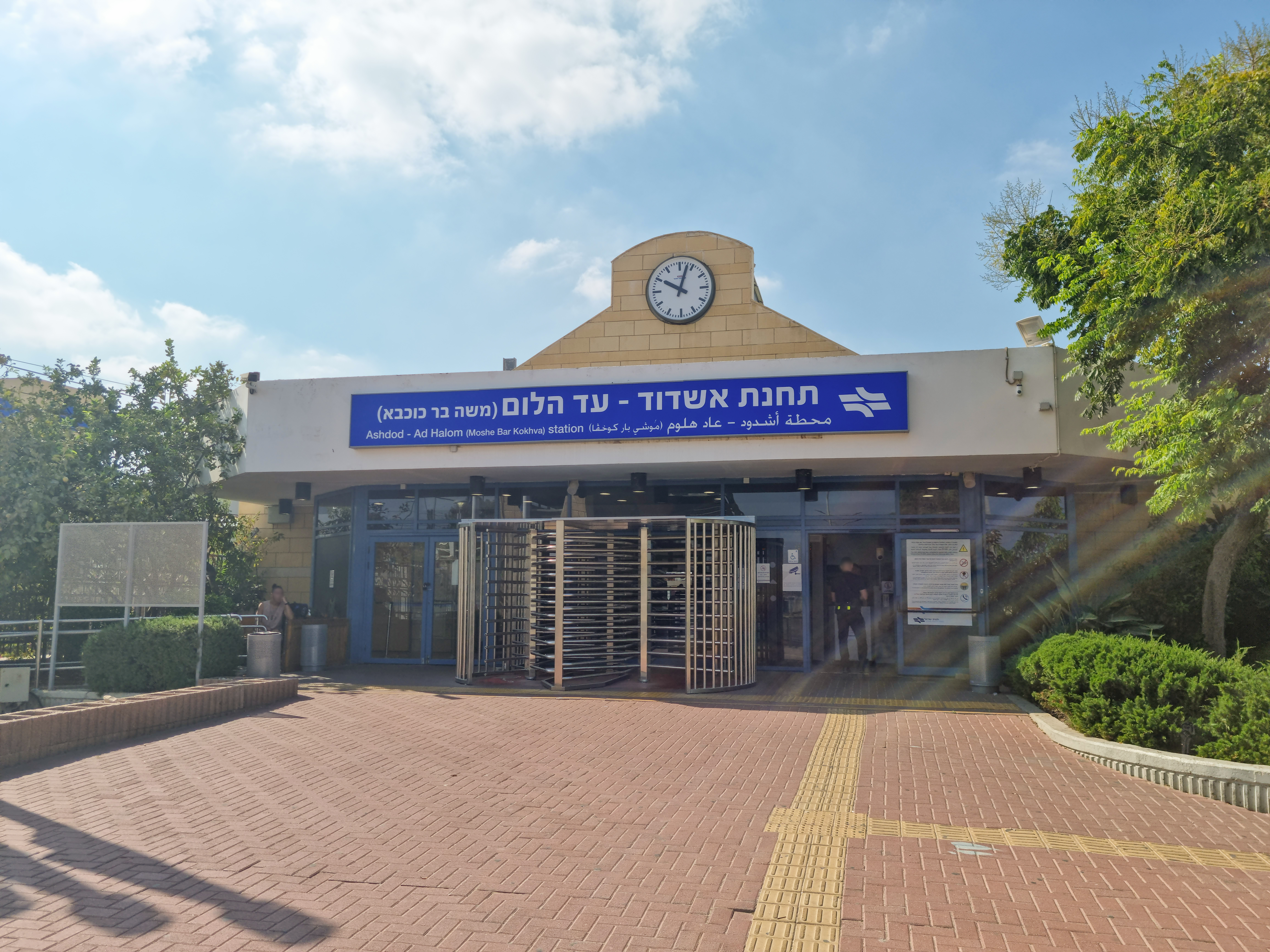
Ashdod Ad Halom railway Station

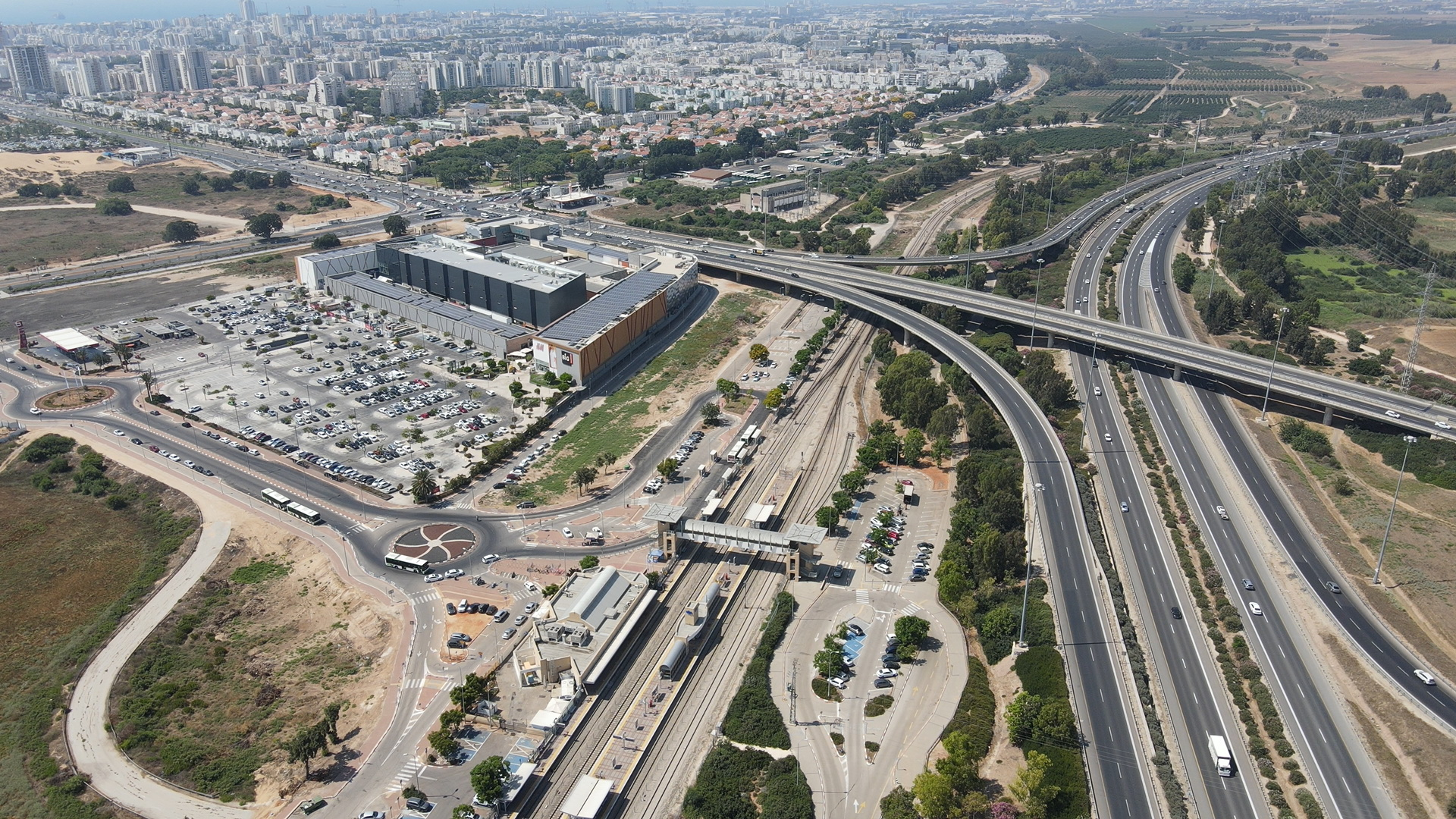
Ad Halom (Ashdod South) interchange and the railway station

The passenger railway connection to Ashdod opened in 1992 after the renovation of the historical railway to Egypt. Ashdod railway station is on Israel Railways' Binyamina/Netanya – Tel Aviv – Ashkelon line and it is located near Ad Halom Junction. The station was upgraded in 2003 when a new terminal building was built. The station building is modern, and proper road access to it was organized on September 23, 2008, when a new road to the station was opened.

There is also heavy freight traffic in the area. Port of Ashdod has its own railway spur line as well as a special terminal for potash brought from the Sodom area and exported abroad.

Under the Ashkelon Mass Transit System plan, two light rail lines will pass through Ashdod, linking it with other cities in the Ashkelon Subdistrict.

== Government ==
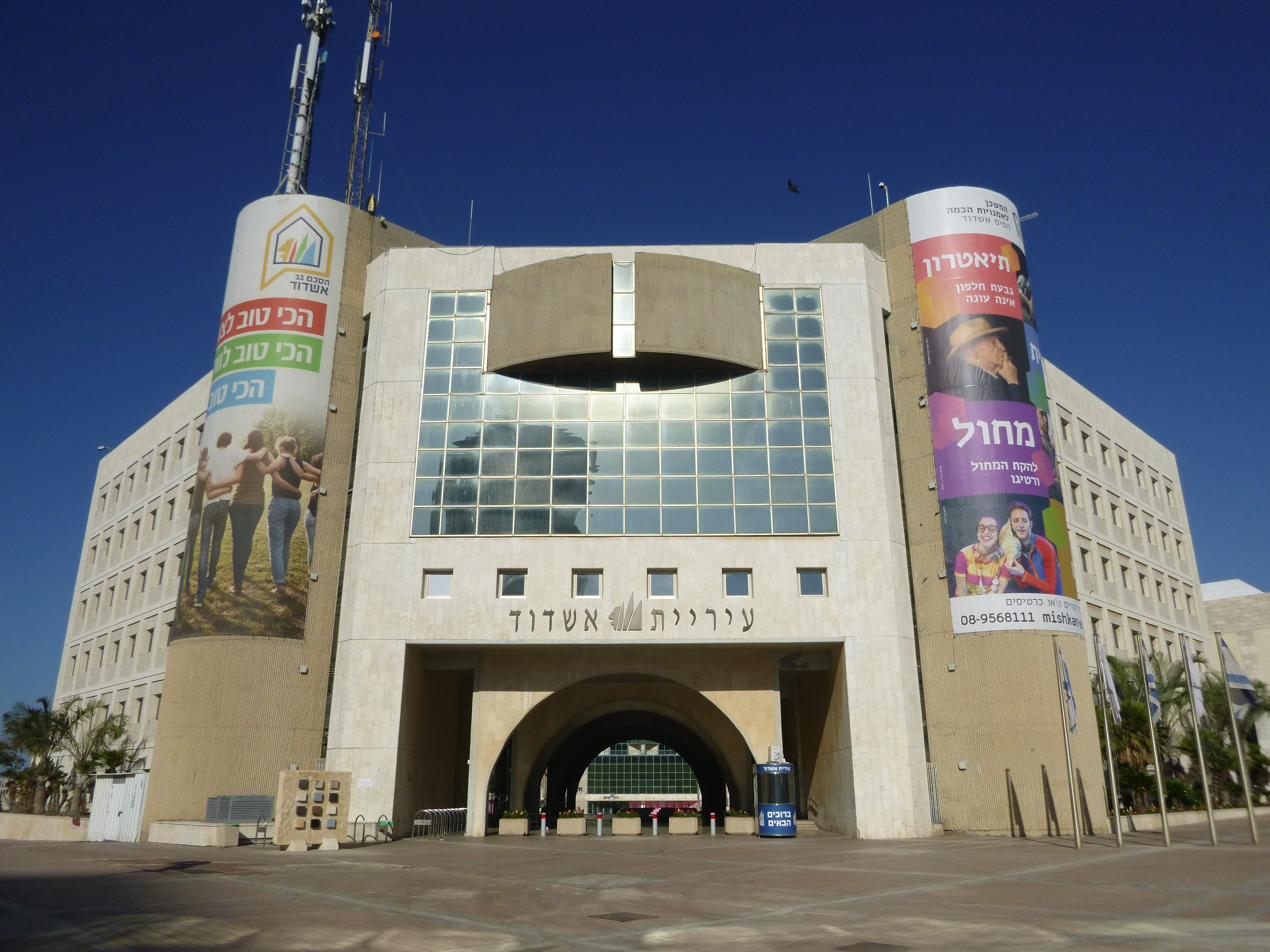
Ashdod city hall

Ashdod was declared a city in 1968. The Ashdod City Council has twenty-five elected members, one of whom is the mayor. The mayor serves a five-year term and appoints six deputies.

=== Mayors ===
- Dov Gur (1959–61)
- Robert Hayim (1961–63)
- Avner Garin (1963–69)
- Zvi Zilker (1969–83)
- Aryeh Azulay (1983–89)
- Zvi Zilker (1989–2008)
- Yehiel Lasri (2008–)

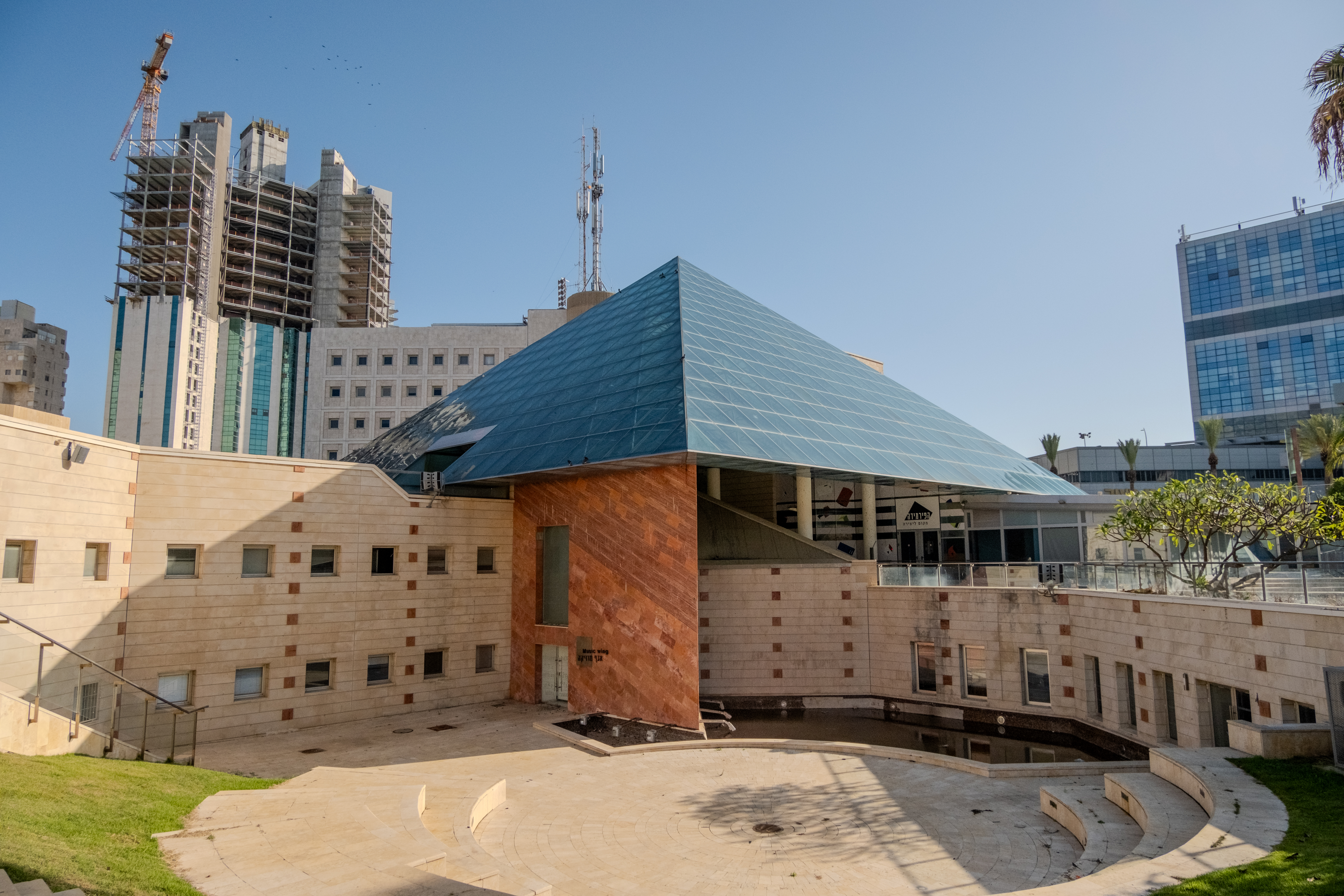
Ashdod MonArt Arts Center

== Culture and art ==
=== Music and performing arts ===
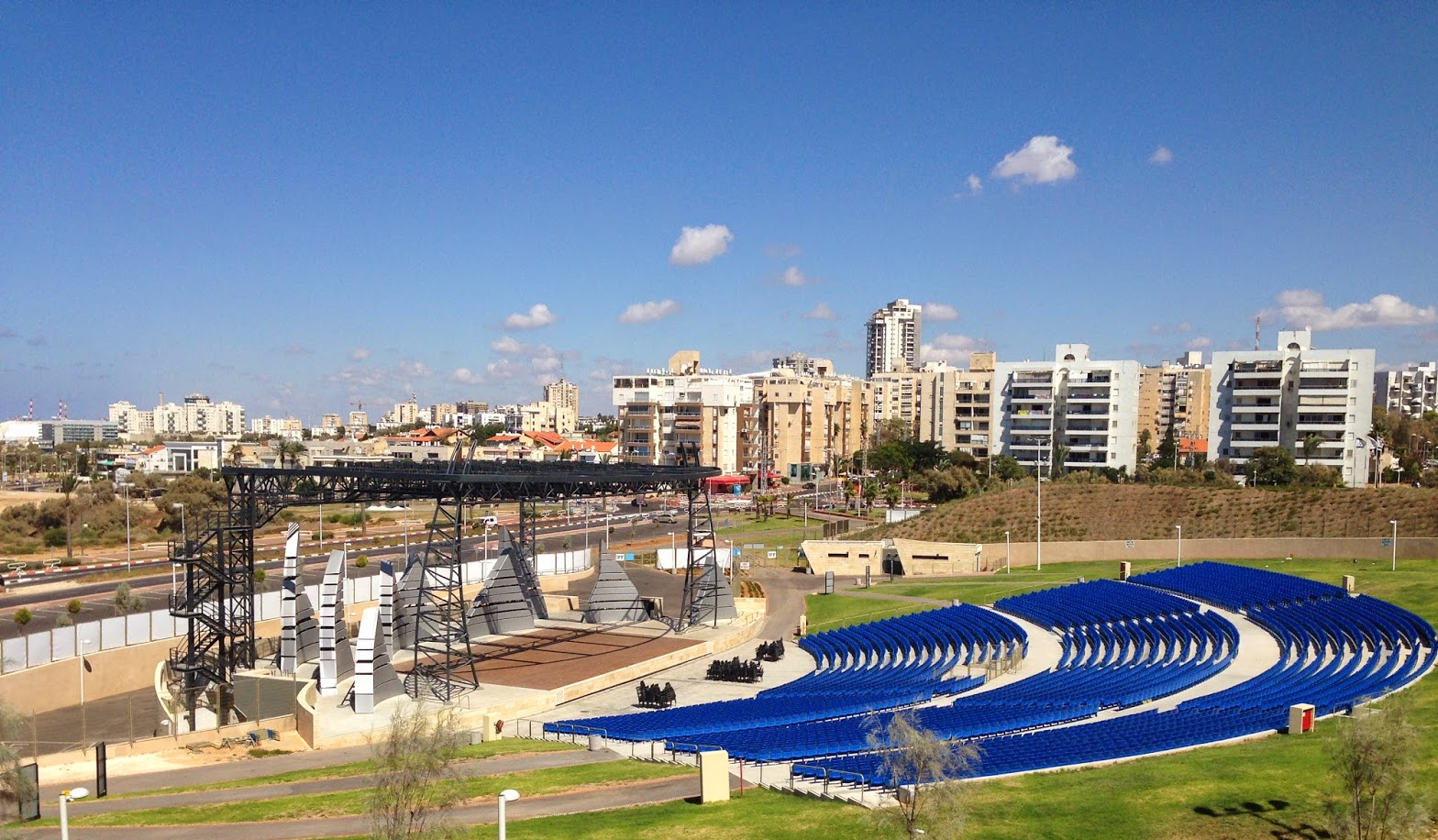
Amphi Ashdod - more than 6,400 seats

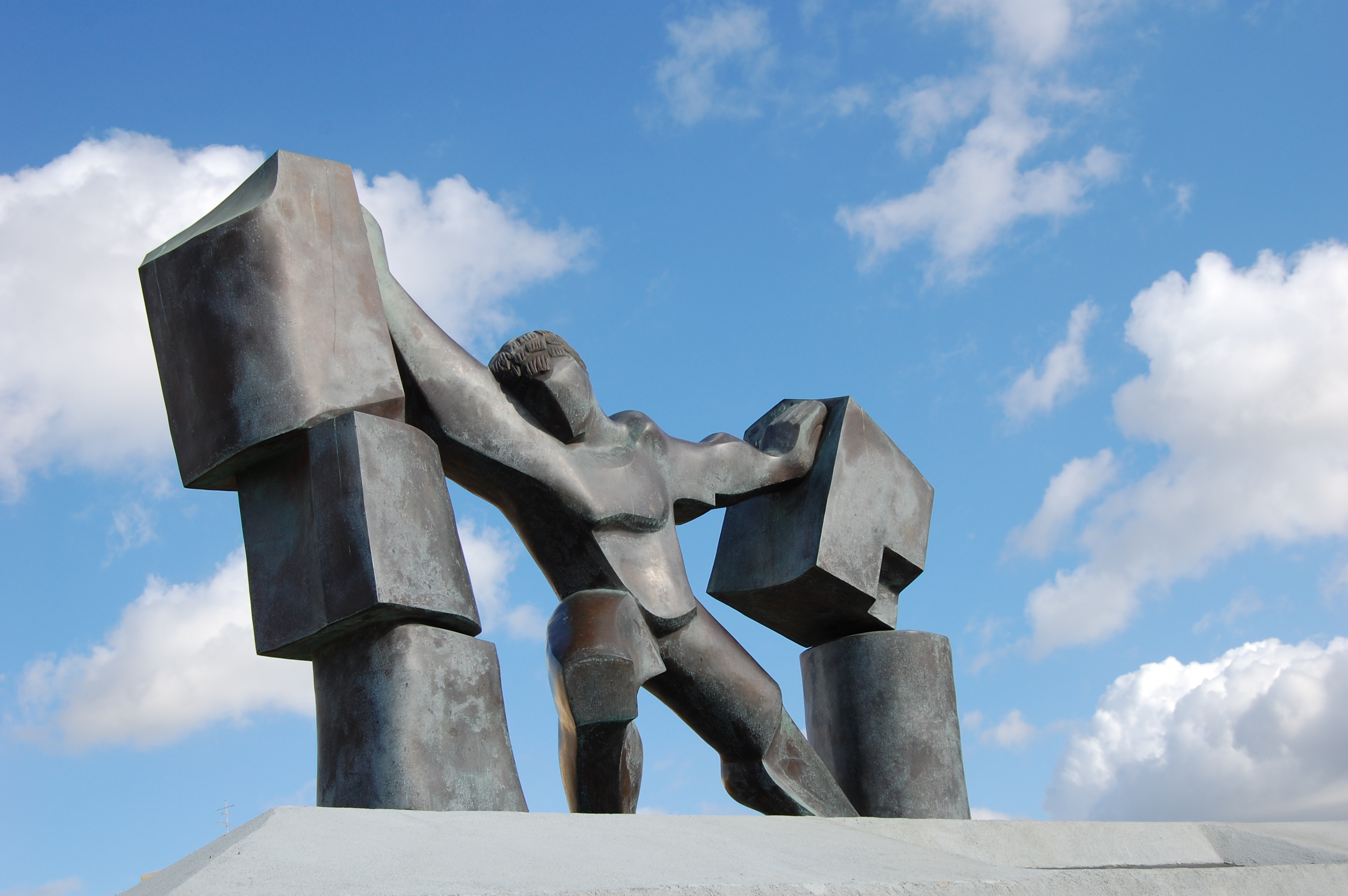
Outdoor sculpture of Samson in Ashdod

Ashdod is home to the Israeli Andalusian Orchestra, which performs Andalusian classical music. The orchestra was awarded the Israel Prize in 2006.

Ashdod also has the Amphi Ashdod theatre.

Ashdod Performing Arts Center is a 938-seat concert hall inaugurated in 2012 in the city's cultural center. Ashdod hosts the annual Super Jazz Ashdod Festival managed by Leonid Ptashka.

The ACADMA conservatory is a school of music and performance studies based in Ashdod, established in 1966 and operated under the supervision of the Ministry of Education.

=== Museums ===
The Corinne Mamane Museum of Philistine Culture is worldwide the only museum dedicated to this topic. It reopened in 2014 with a new interactive exhibition. The Museum displays significant Philistine artifacts form each of the five cities in the Philistine pentapolis.

The Ashdod Museum of Art, located in the MonArt center (see above at "Music and performing arts"), has 12 galleries and two exhibition halls. In an architectural echo of the Louvre, the entrance to the museum is through a glass pyramid. In 2003 the internal spaces of the museum were redesigned by the architects Eyal Weizman, Rafi Segal and Manuel Herz.

== Sports ==
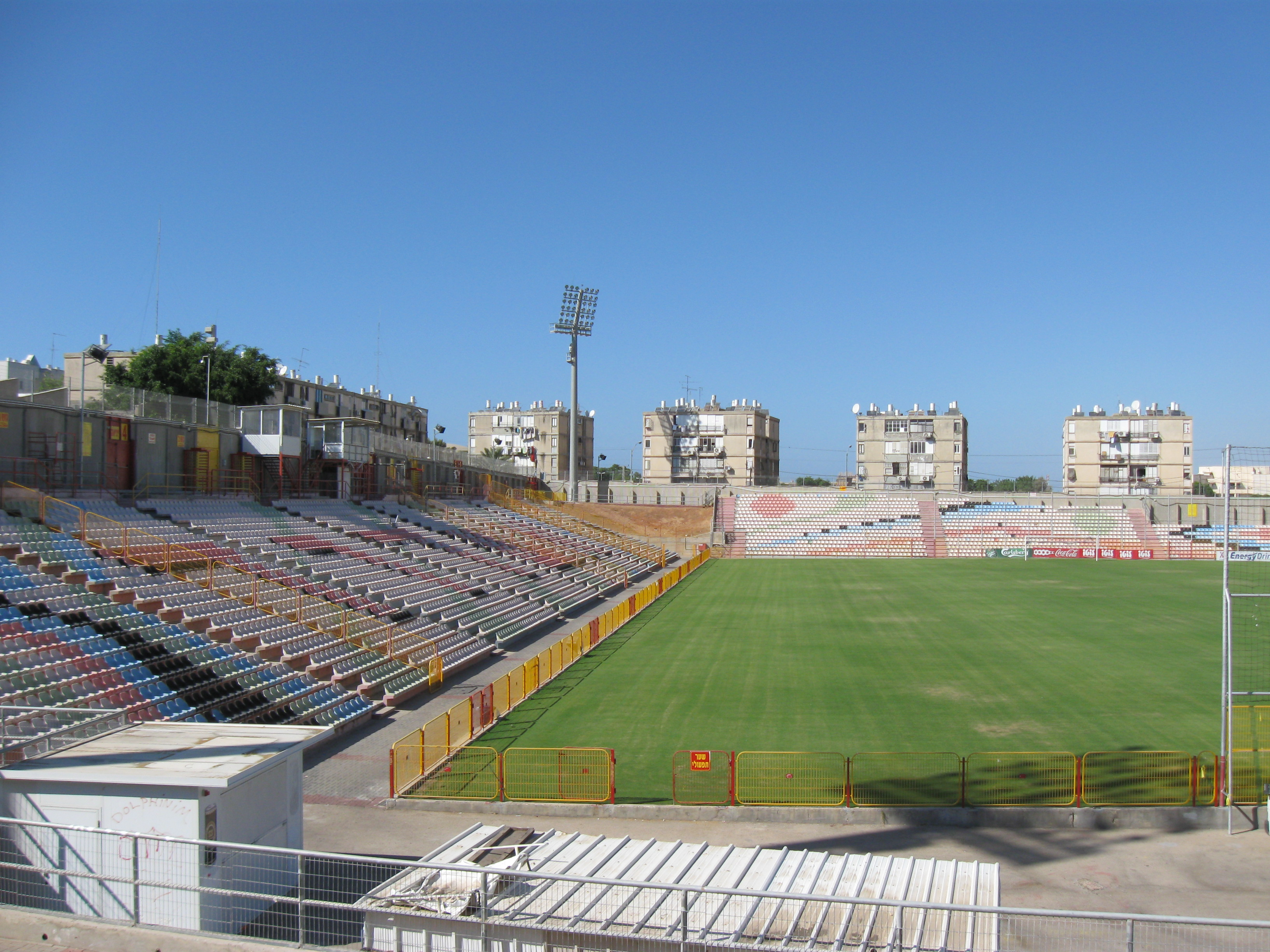
Yud-Alef Stadium

Ashdod's football team, F.C. Ironi Ashdod represents the city in the Israeli Premier League, and Hapoel Ashdod F.C. plays in Liga Alef.

Ashdod is home to the basketball team Maccabi Ashdod, whose men's squad plays in First League, and women's squad Maccabi Bnot Ashdod plays in top division.

The city has a cricket team managed by citizens of Indian descent.

Notable athletes from Ashdod include:

- Vered Borochovsky – 2000 Sydney Olympics and 2004 Summer Olympics swimmer.
- Alon Day – Professional race car driver.
- Alon Hazan – international soccer player
- Haim Revivo – international soccer player

== Voting patterns ==
In the 2022 election, 67 percent of voters in Ashdod voted for the parties of the right-wing coalition led by Benjamin Netanyahu, while 31 percent voted for the parties of the center-left coalition led by Yair Lapid and 0.1 percent voted for the Arab parties.

In the 2026 election, 63 percent of voters in Ashdod voted for the parties of the right-wing coalition led by Benjamin Netanyahu, while 32 percent voted for the parties of the center-left coalition led by Gadi Eisenkot and 0.1 percent voted for the Arab parties. An additional 3 percent voted for the Reservists, and 1.3 percent voted for Amcha Yisrael. Voter turnout increased 9 percent from the 2022 election.

== Twin towns – sister cities ==
Ashdod is twinned with

Bahir Dar, Ethiopia; Bordeaux, France; Bahía Blanca, Argentina; (United States) Los Angeles, California, US; Wuhan, China	Spandau, Germany; (United States) Tampa, Florida, US; Brest, Belarus; (Georgia (country)) Batumi, Georgia; Tiraspol, Moldova	Zaporizhzhia, Ukraine; Atyrau, Kazakhstan; Arkhangelsk, Russia; Chișinău, Moldova; Jūrmala, Latvia

== Notable people ==
- Georgy Adelson-Velsky, mathematician
- Ofir Ben Shitrit (born 1995), singer
- Nir Bitton (born 1991), footballer
- Alon Day (born 1991), racing driver
- Igor Olshanetskyi (born 1986), Olympic weightlifter
- Valery Panov (born 1938), dancer and choreographer
- Dorit Revelis (born 2001), model
- Haim Revivo (born 1972), footballer
- Anna Zak (born 2001), social media star

== See also ==
- Ashdod on the Sea, Ashdod's historic twin city, now part of modern Ashdod
- Isdud, Palestinian city whose residents were driven out or expelled in 1948
- Rimal Isdud, historical sand/dune cultural landscape in the Ashdod Dune Field.
- Minat al-Qal'a, the Early Muslim castle at Ashdod on the Sea
- Cities of the ancient Near East
- Depopulated Palestinian locations in Israel
- Cities in the Book of Joshua
