= Ashdod Marina =

Marina in Ashdod, Israel

Coordinates: 31°47′41″N 34°37′41″E

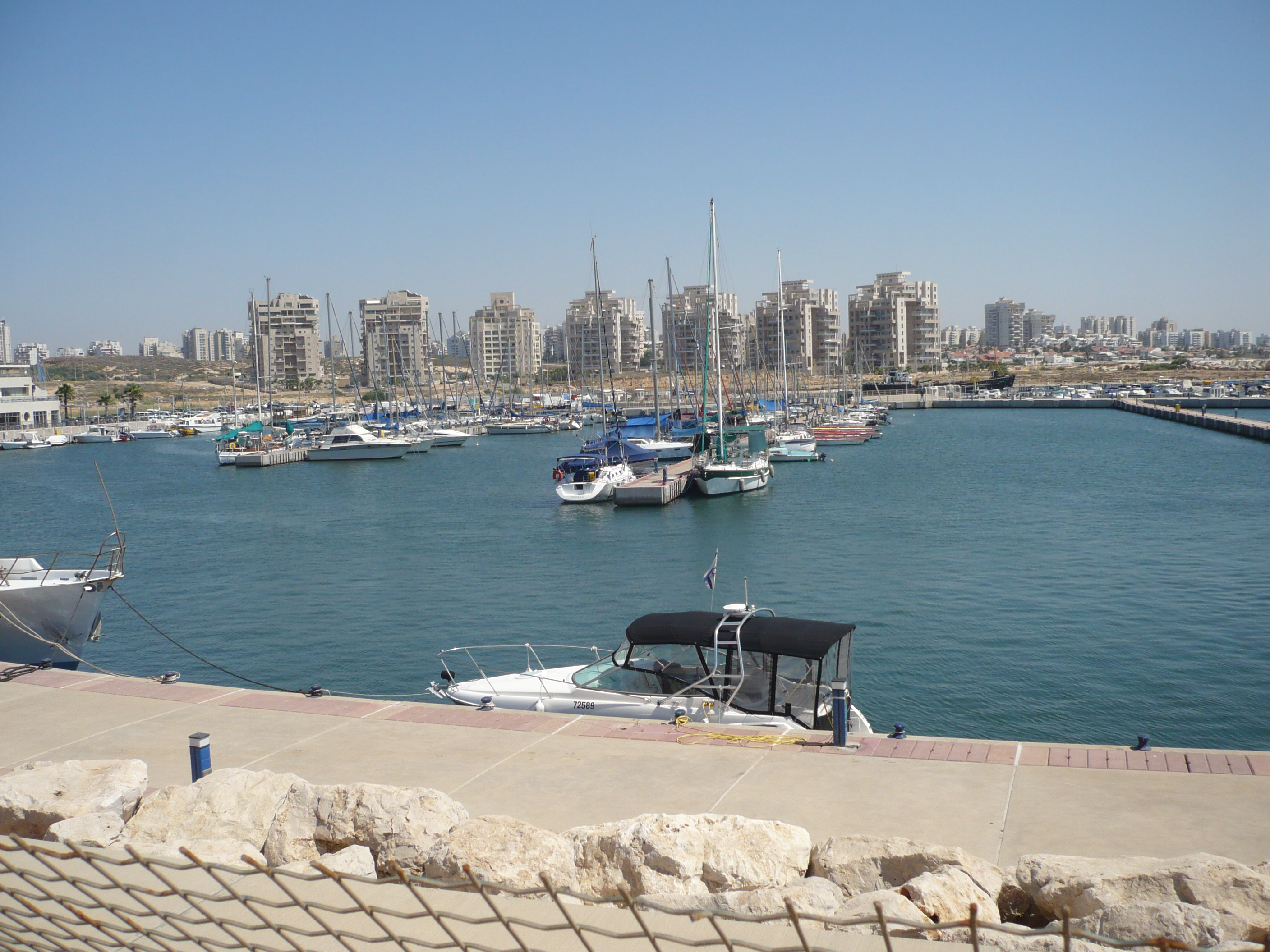
Marina" in Ashdod

Ashdod Marina in Ashdod is one of the newest marinas in Israel. It is located close to the city center in the middle of beach zone. The marina has berths for nearly 550 crafts. The surrounding area is being developed and will have hotels, restaurants, artificial lakes, and promenades.

The Ashdod Marina is a center for sea sports as well. There are surfing, sailing, and diving schools located onsite.
