= Museum of Philistine Culture =

Museum in Israel

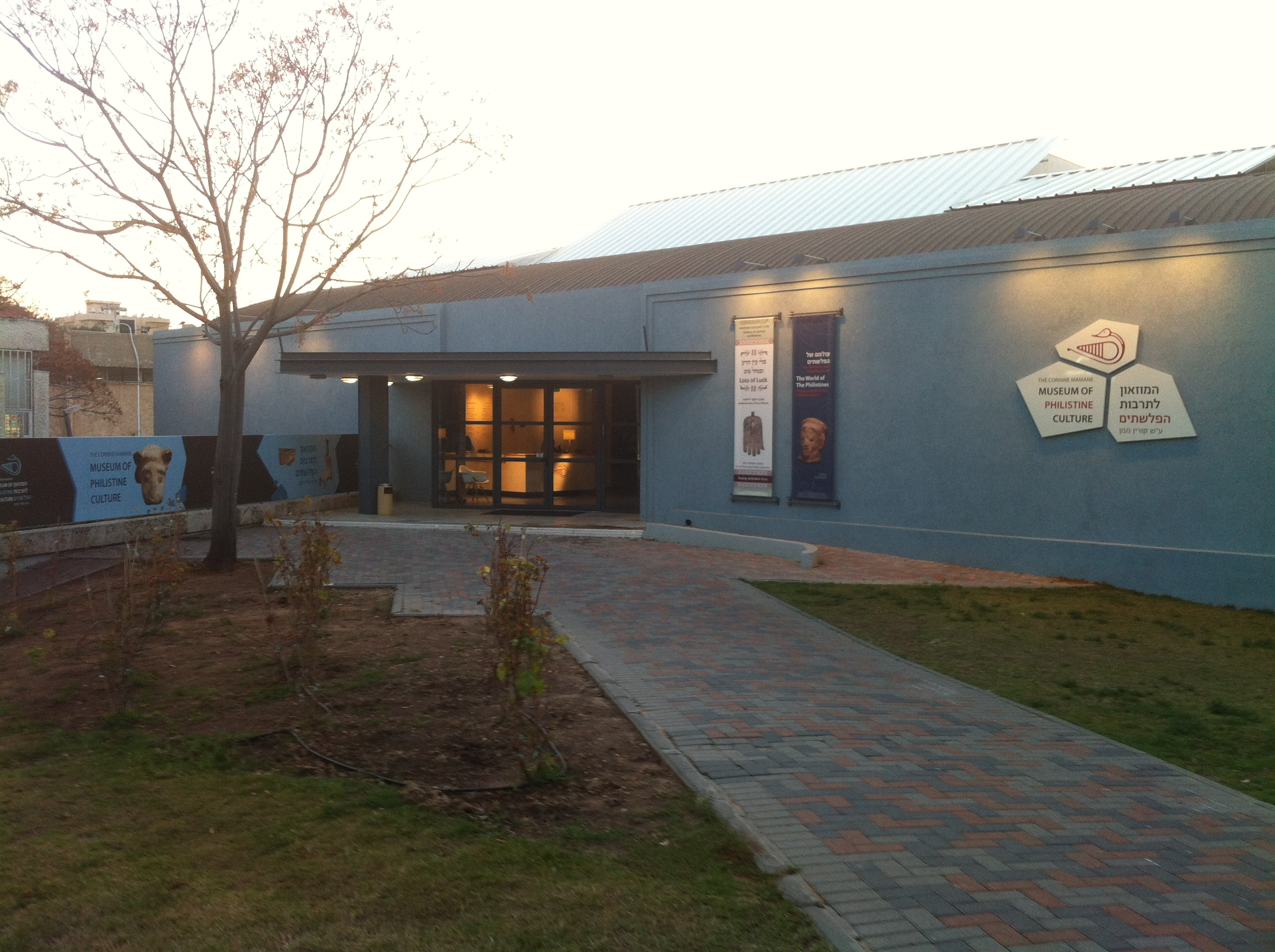
- Established: 1990
- Website: www.phcm.co.il/en

The Museum of Philistine Culture (Hebrew: המוזיאון לתרבות הפלשתים ע"ש קורין ממן) is an archaeological museum in Ashdod (Israel). The museum is dedicated to the culture of the Philistines, the ancient people who inhabited the maritime part of Israel from the XII century BC. It is the only museum in the world completely dedicated to the Philistine people.

The museum has a permanent exhibition showing archaeological finds, as well as temporary exhibitions. Cultural events are held for visitors; in particular, they can try on clothes similar to those worn by the ancient Philistines, and try the dishes of their cuisine.

In 1990, the Museum of Philistine Culture became the first museum to open in Ashdod.

== Gallery ==
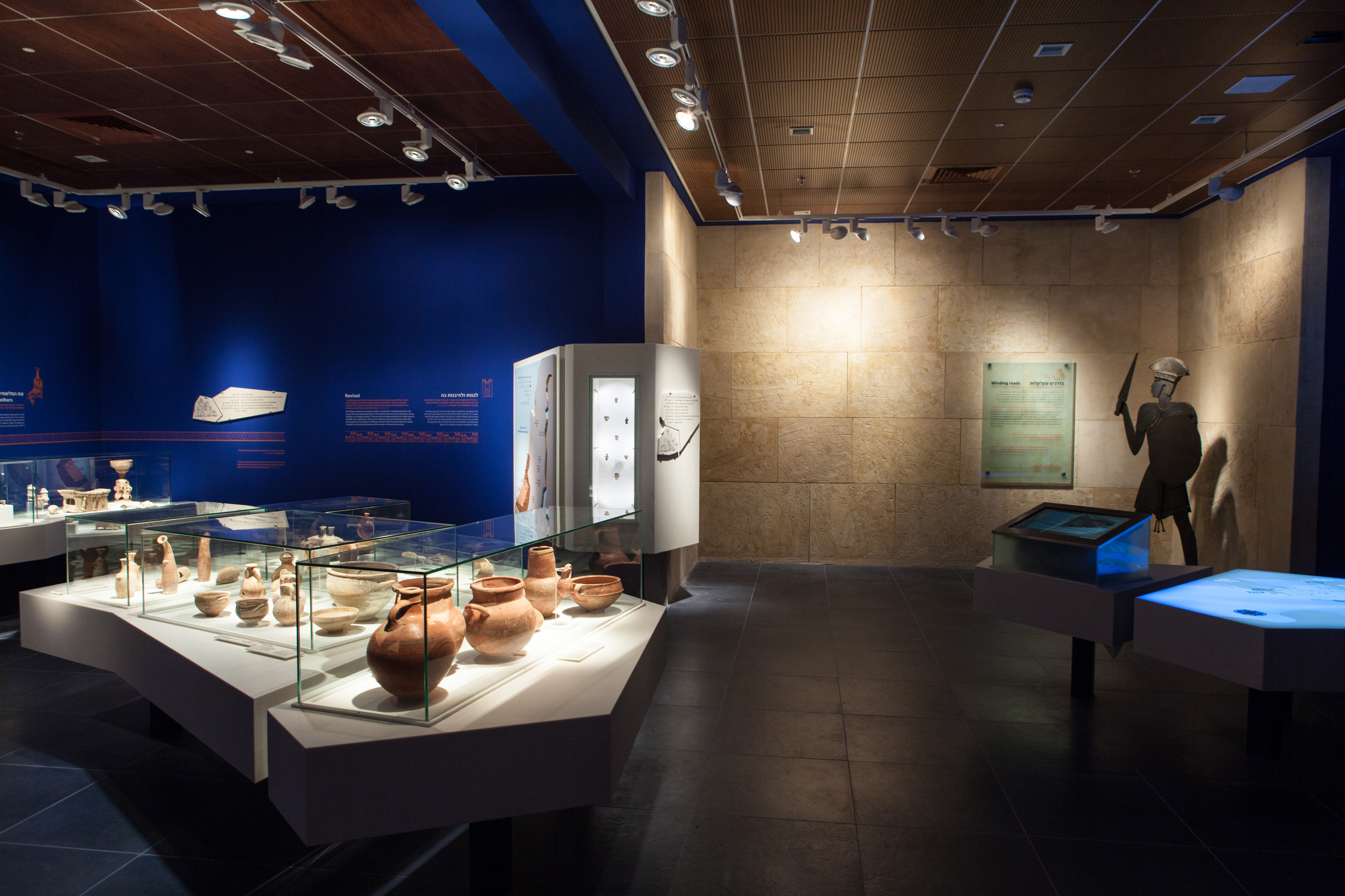

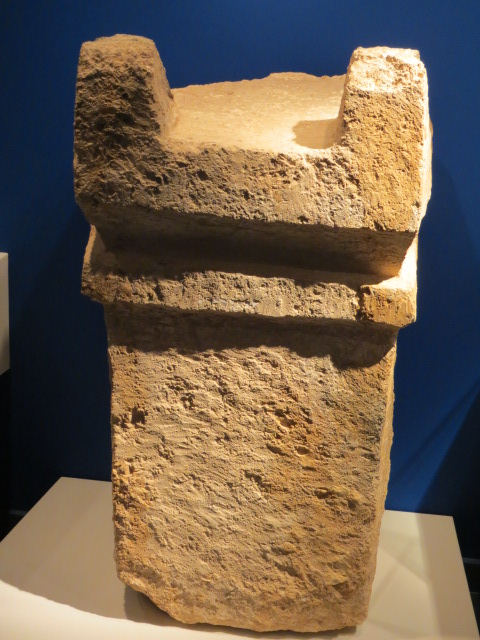

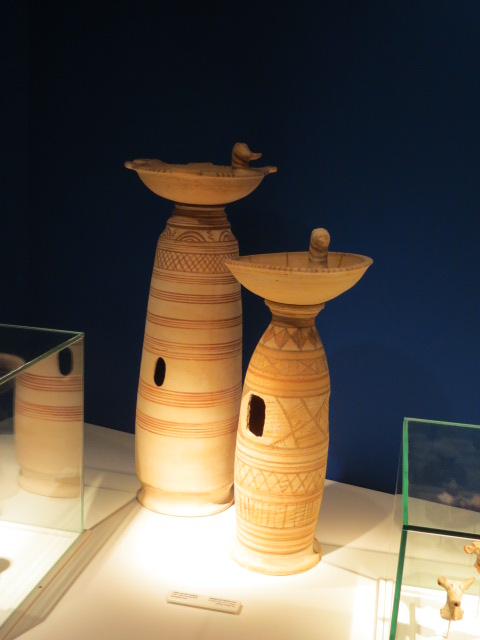

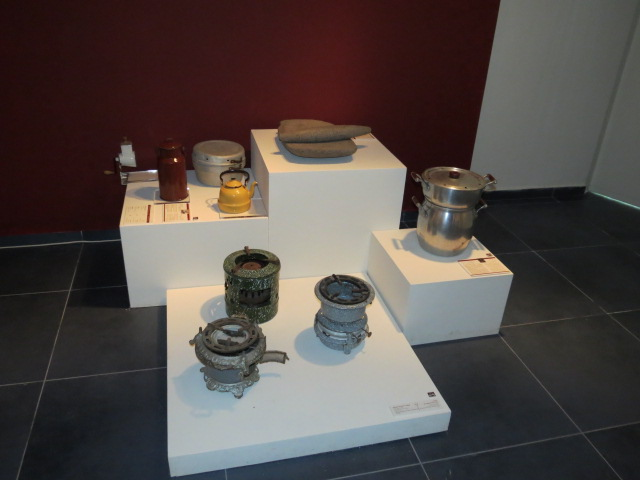
