= Ashdod Performing Arts Center =

Performing arts center in Ashdod, Israel

Coordinates: 31.7919°N 34.6372°E

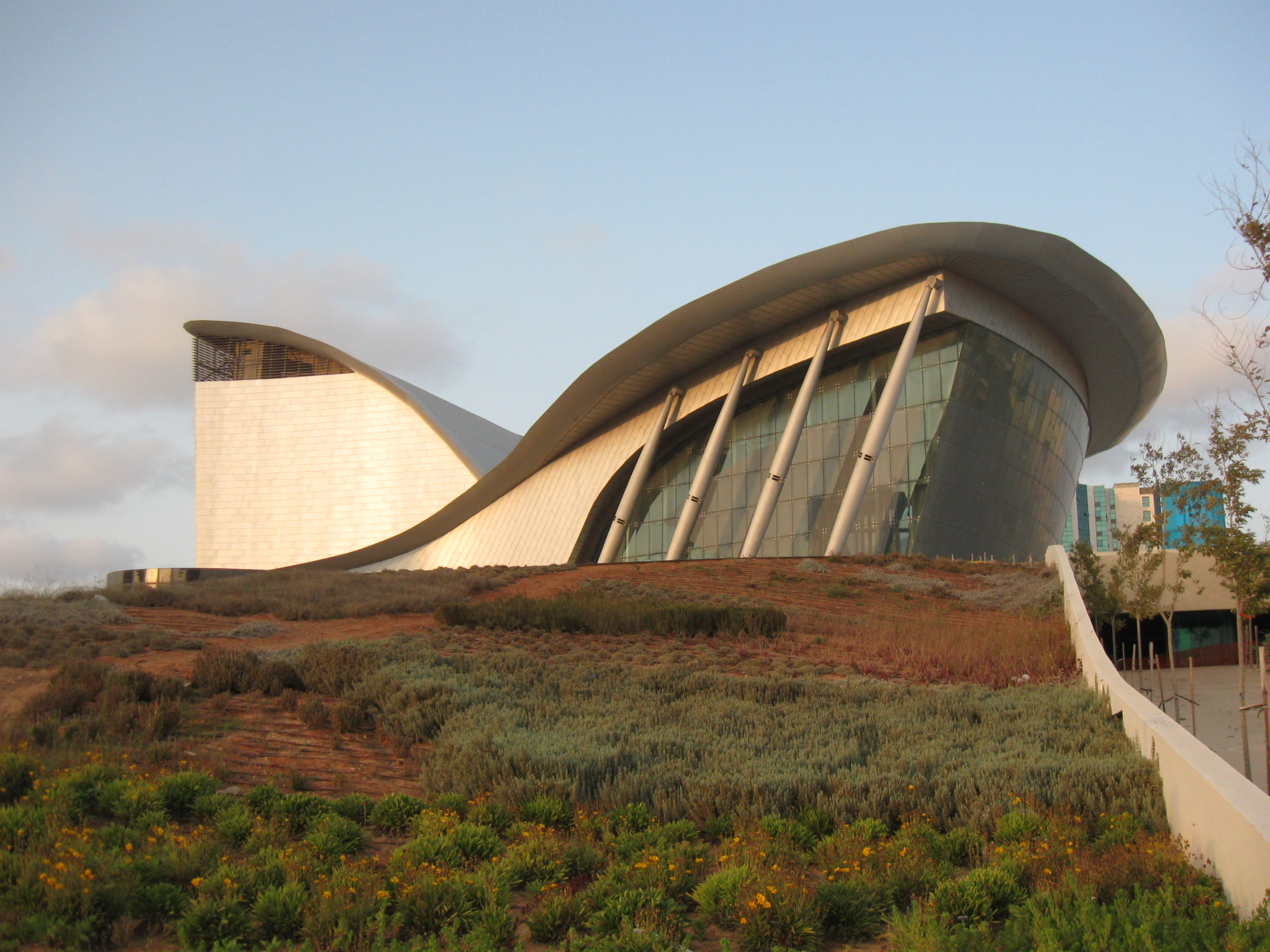
- Arts center in 2010
- Interactive map of Ashdod Performing Arts Center
- Location: Ashdod, Israel
- Capacity: 938

Construction
- Opened: 4 May 2012
- Cost: 140 million
- Architect: Haim Dotan

Website
- mishkan-ashdod.co.il

Ashdod Performing Arts Center is a performing arts venue located in Ashdod, Israel. The building was designed by Israeli architect Haim Dotan, who also designed Sami Shamoon College of Engineering in Beersheva.

== See also ==
- Culture of Israel
- Dance in Israel
- Music of Israel
- Architecture of Israel
