= Amphi Ashdod =

Coordinates: 31.7989°N 34.6357°E

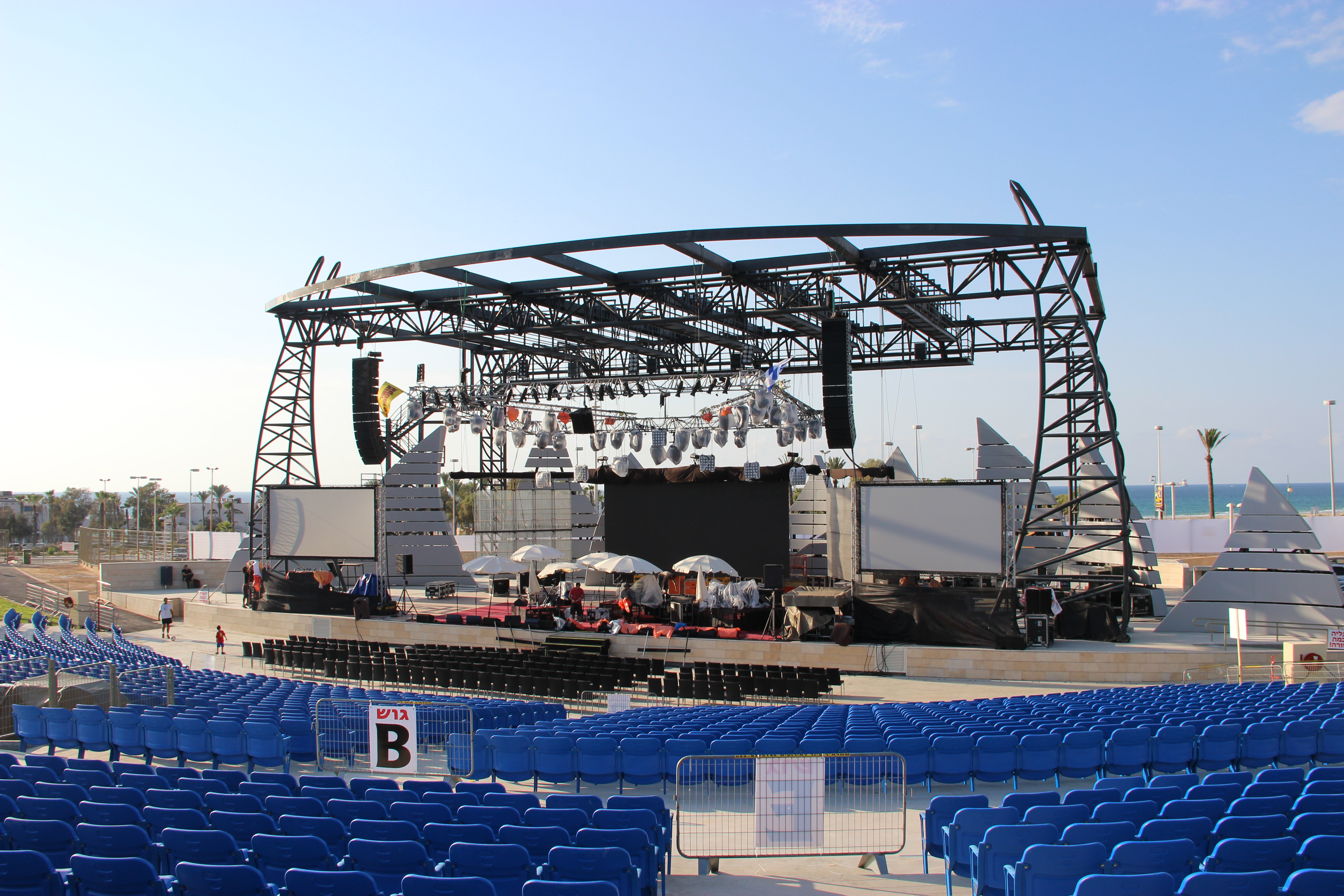
The Amphitheater at Ashdod-Yam Park

Amphi Ashdod is an open theater that is located in Ashdod-Yam Park, near the Arches Beach of Ashdod, Israel.

Amphi Ashdod is one of Israel's largest open theaters with a capacity of 6,400 spectators. It contains 4,500 seats, a large grass area that can fit another 1,700 guests and a VIP section that can host 200 guests.

The Amphi hosts Israeli and international concerts during the Summer and Spring. In addition, the Amphi hosts the annual international art festival "Méditerranée". The stage was designed like a shell with petals that open up. During the day, spectators can see the Mediterranean Sea while looking at the stage.
