= Ashdod (disambiguation) =

Ashdod is a city in Israel.

Ashdod may also refer to:

== Places ==
- Ashdod (ancient city), an ancient Levantine metropolis, now an archaeological site near modern Ashdod in Israel
- Ashdod-Yam, an ancient port city, now in the southern part of the modern city of Ashdod

== Other ==
- F.C. Ashdod, an Israeli football club
