= Azotus =

Azotus is the Hellenistic Greek name of the ancient city of Ashdod. A separate but connected port developed on the seashore, and Azotus may refer to either of the cities:

- Ashdod (ancient city) (Azotus Mesogaios, 'inland Azotus')
- Ashdod-Yam (Azotus Paralios, 'coastal Azotus')
