= Minat al-Qal'a =

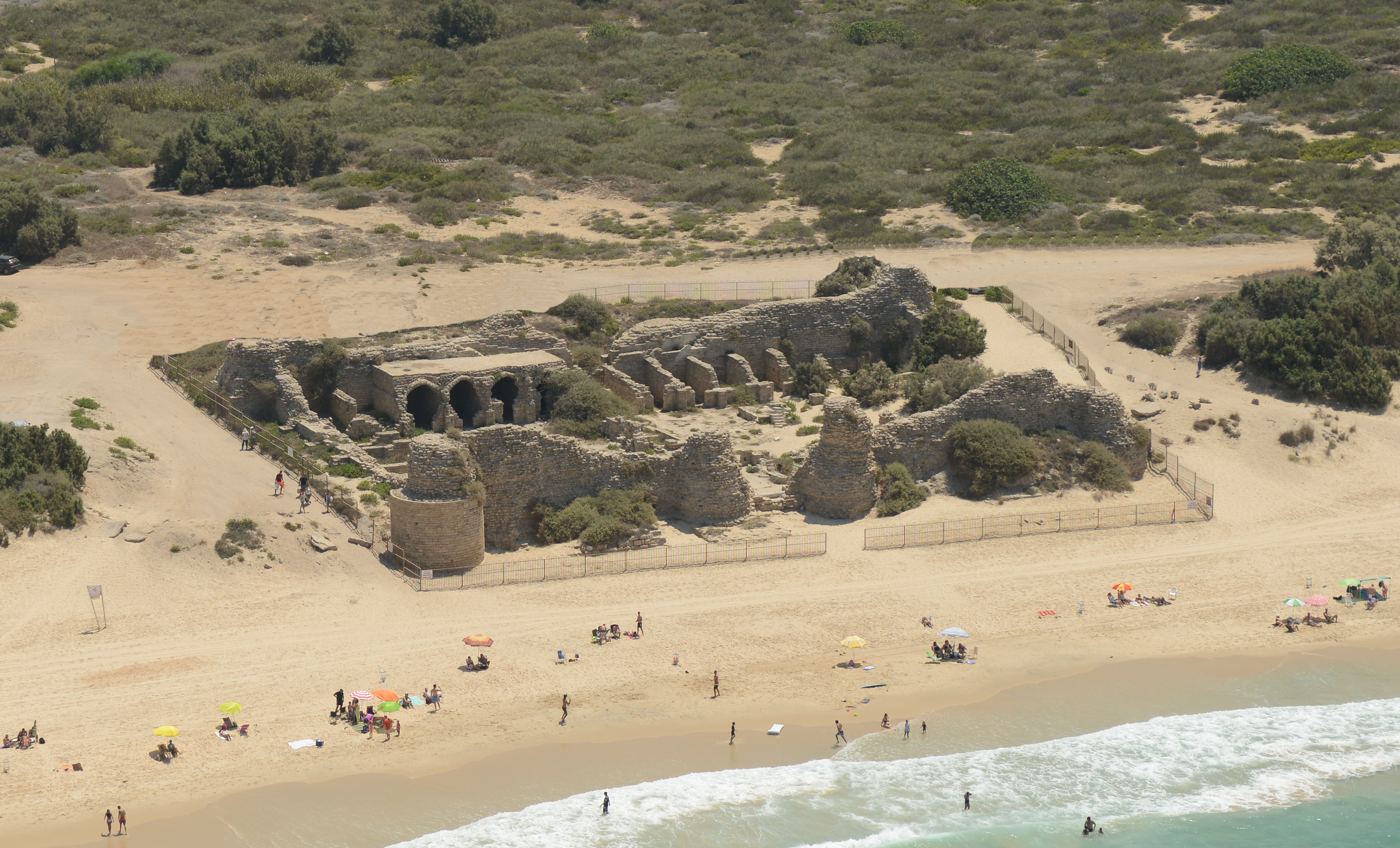
- Aerial view of Minat al-Qal'a
- Interactive map of Minat al-Qal'a
- 31°46′48″N 34°37′17.5″E
- Type: Fort
- Periods: Umayyad Fatimid Crusader
- Location: Israel
- Palestine grid: 114/132

Site notes
- Condition: Ruin

Minat al-Qal'a (Arabic: مِنَاة الْقَلَعَة, lit. 'harbour of the fort'; Hebrew: מצודת אשדוד ים, romanized: Metzudat Ashdod Yam, lit. 'Ashdod Yam Fortress'; (Note: Also known in Hebrew as Hurbat Ashdod Yam (חורבת אשדוד ים, 'Ruins of Ashdod Yam')) Latin: Castellum Beroart) is a medieval coastal fort protecting the port known as Ashdod-Yam (lit. "Ashdod-on-the-Sea"), which was historically separate from Ashdod proper but whose archaeological remains are today located on the southern beach of the sprawling modern city of Ashdod. The fort was built by the Umayyads and later restored by the Crusaders.

== Etymology ==
The medieval Arabic name was Mahuz Azdud, "harbour of Azdud", after centuries of being known as "Azotus paralios" (Greek for Ashdod-on-the-Sea) The modern Arabic name, Minat al-Qal'a, means "The harbour (mina) with the fortress (qal'a)", while the modern Hebrew name, "Hurbat Ashdod Yam" means the "ruins of Ashdod-on-the-Sea."

== History ==
=== Early Muslim period ===
The fort was built by the Umayyad Caliph Abd al-Malik ibn Marwan (reign 685–705 CE) before the end of the 7th century on top of Byzantine-era remains. It was in use during the 10th-11th centuries, and was restored and used again by the Crusaders in the late 12th century after sustaining serious damage from the 1033 earthquake. The fort was meant to protect the port from raids by the Byzantine navy, while the port itself was used by the same navy to exchange Muslim prisoners for ransom.

=== Crusader period ===
Archaeological excavations show that the fort was restored and reused during the Crusader period. They come to prove what was already known from documents from the era, which indicate that Nicolas de Beroard, a knight of lord Hugh of Ramla, was in charge of the stronghold in 1169. From this period it is known as Castellum Beroart.

=== Ayyubid and Mamluk periods ===
The port stops being mentioned during the Ayyubid and Mamluk periods, making it likely that it was destroyed by the Muslims along with the other port cities from the coast of Palestine, due to fears that they might again be used by Crusader invasions from the sea.

=== Ottoman era ===
In 1863 Victor Guérin visited and described it, while in 1873–4, it was described by Charles Simon Clermont-Ganneau. In 1882, the Palestine Exploration Fund's Survey of Western Palestine described it as being apparently from "the Middle Ages".

== Archaeology ==
The almost rectangular fortress (35×55 meters) was enclosed by a six to seven meters high curtain wall. It has four solid corner towers, and two semicircular ones flanking each of the two huge gates that gave access to the stronghold from the west and east.

== Gallery ==
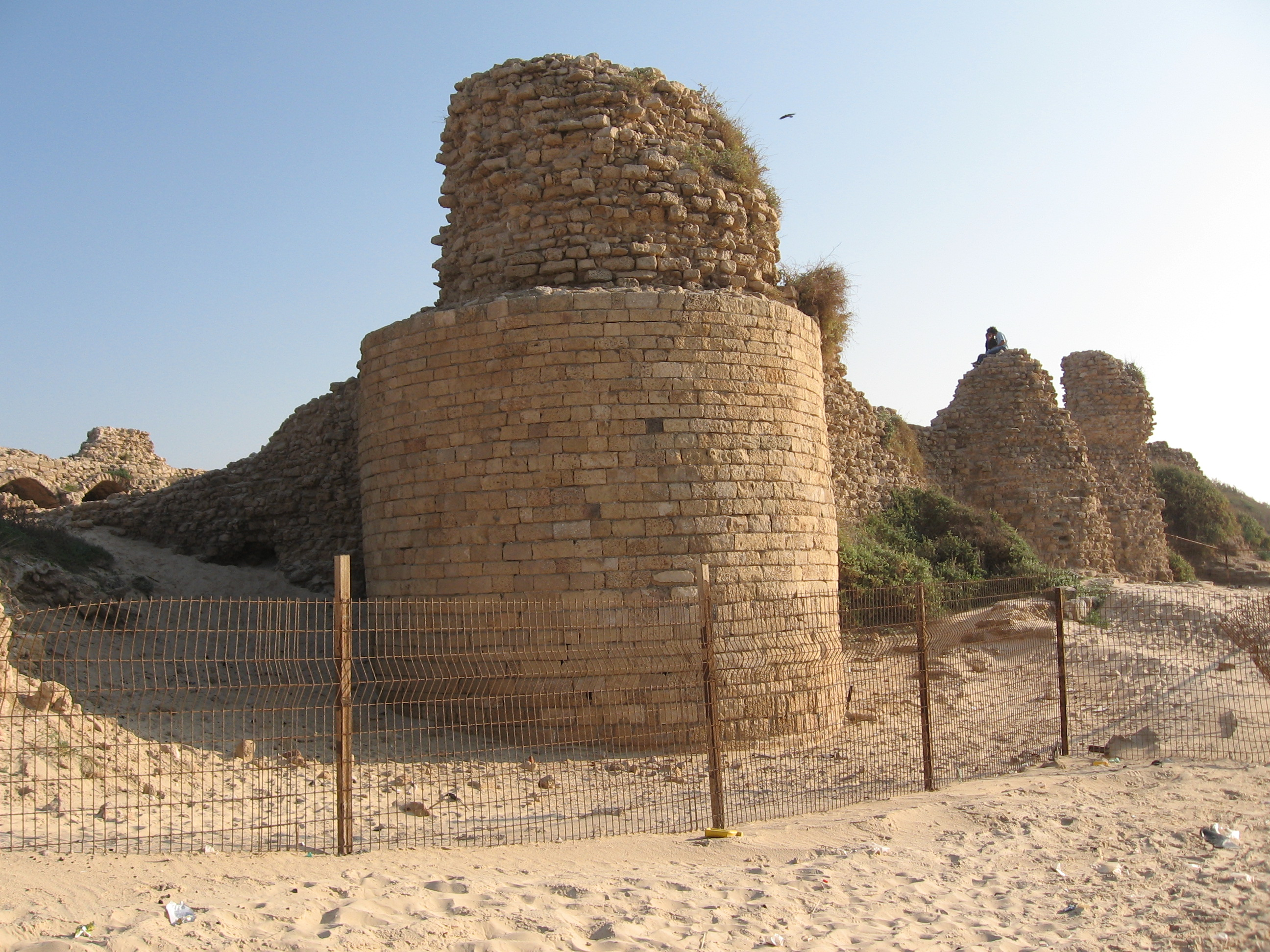
Northwestern corner tower

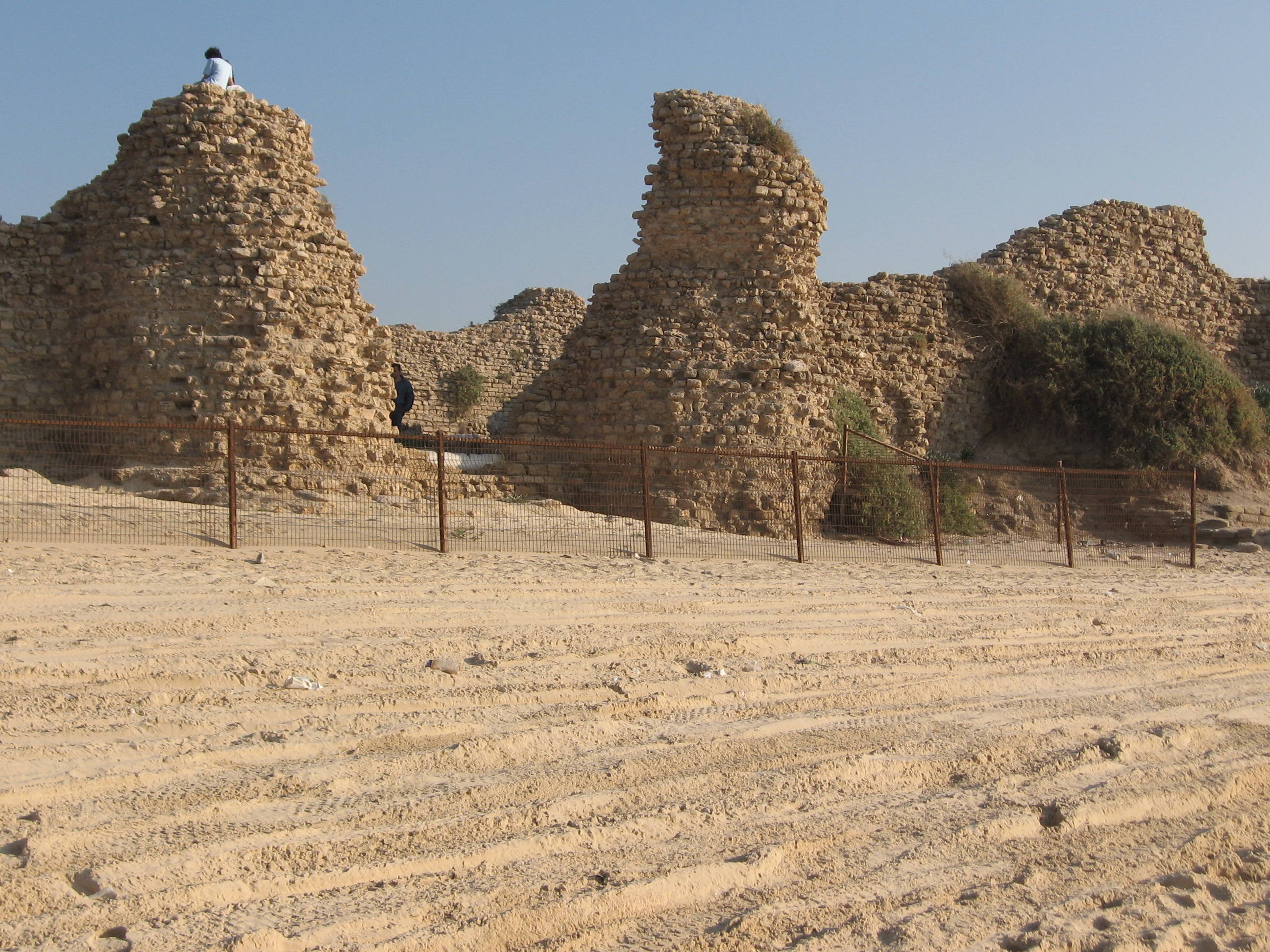
The Sea Gate, or western gate

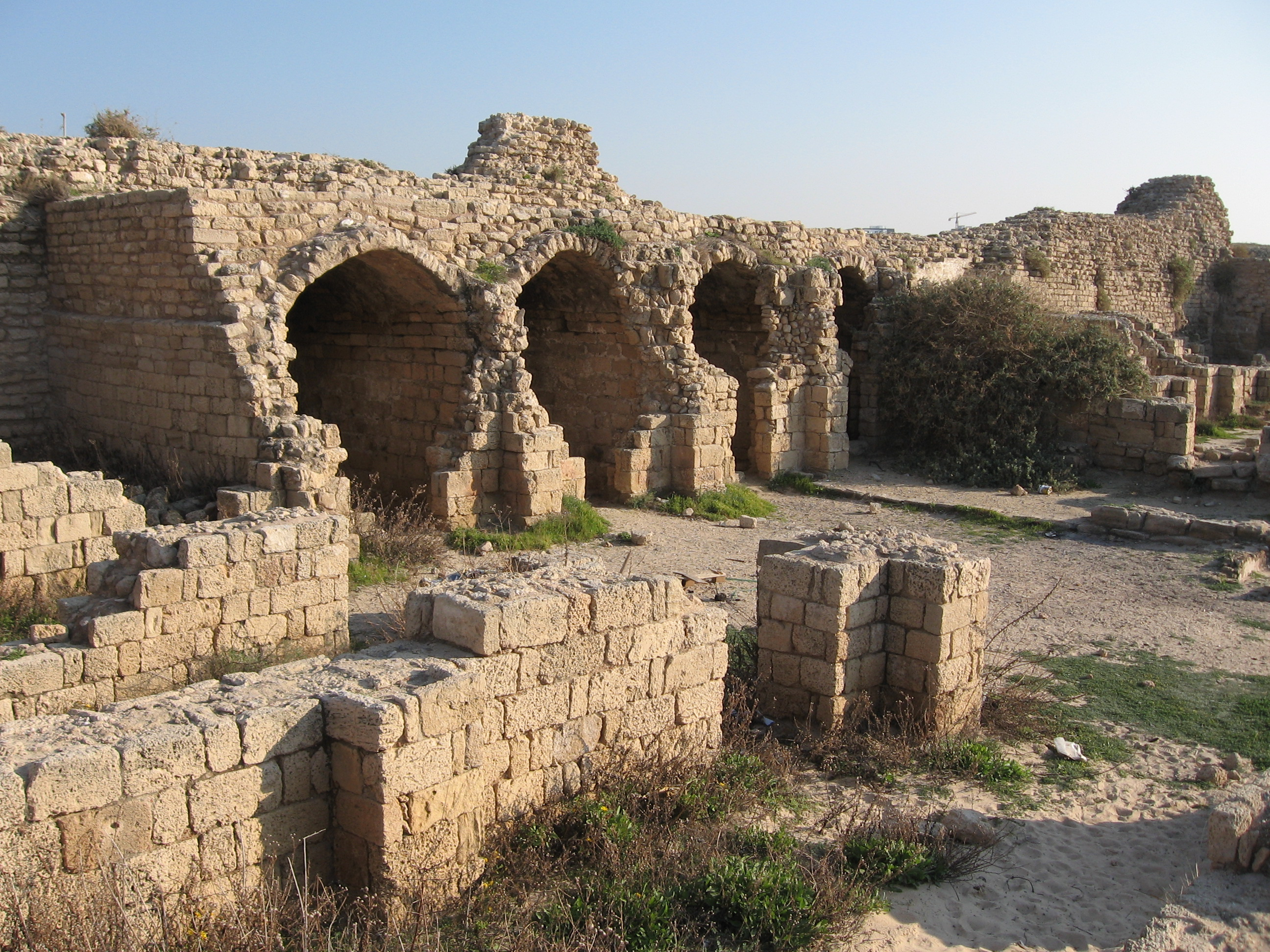
Vaulted storerooms

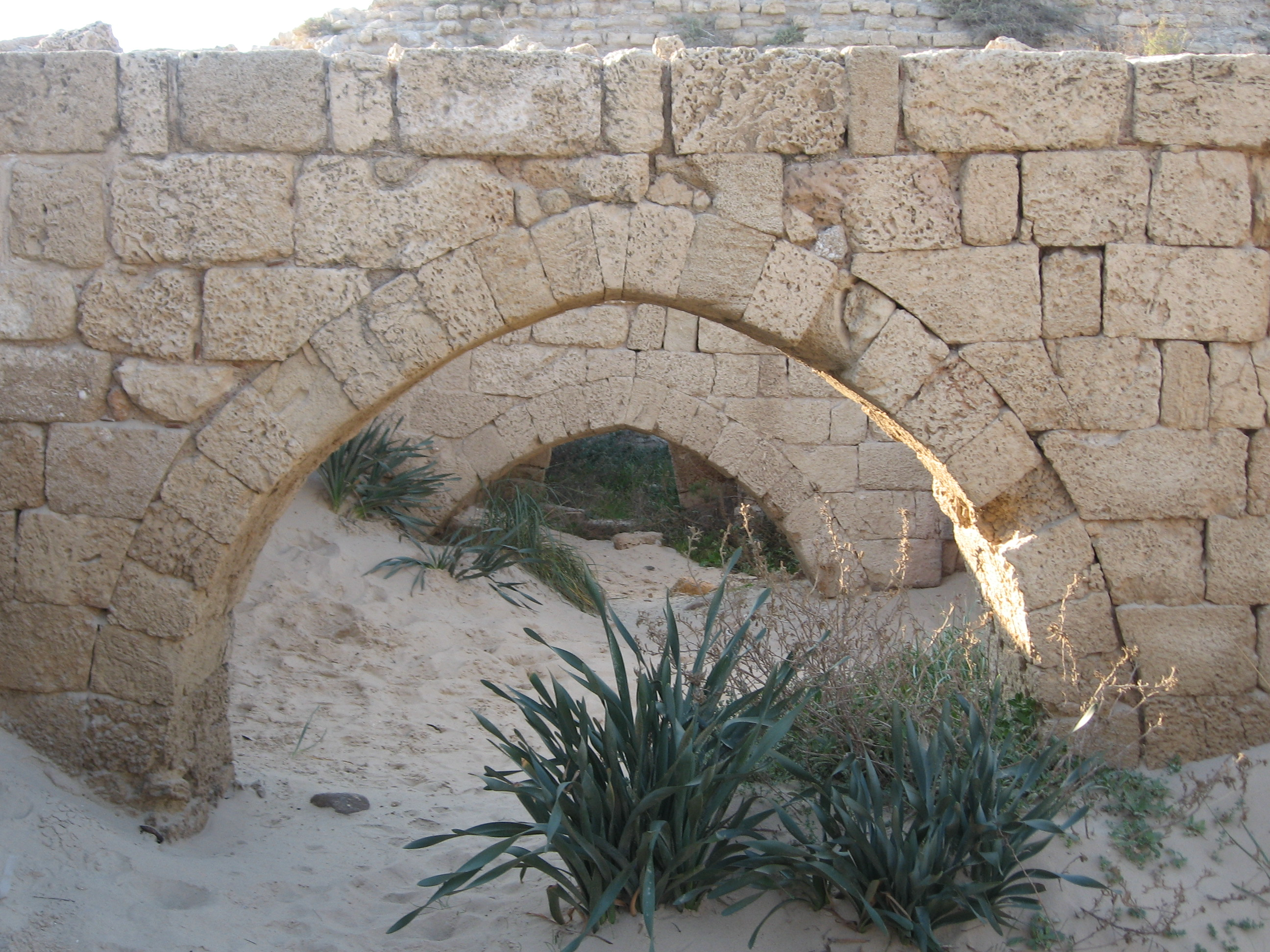
Arches

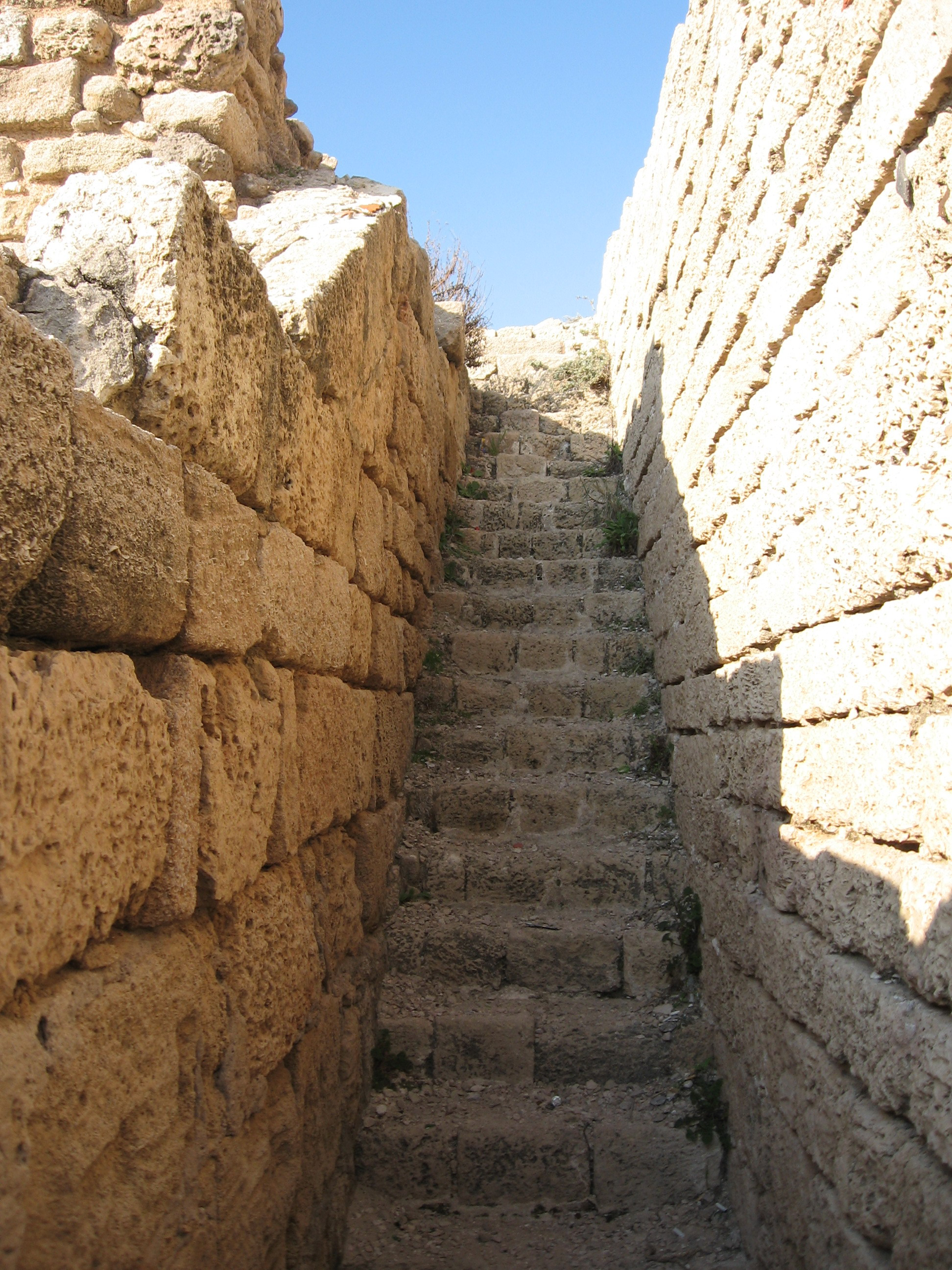
Staircase to upper floor

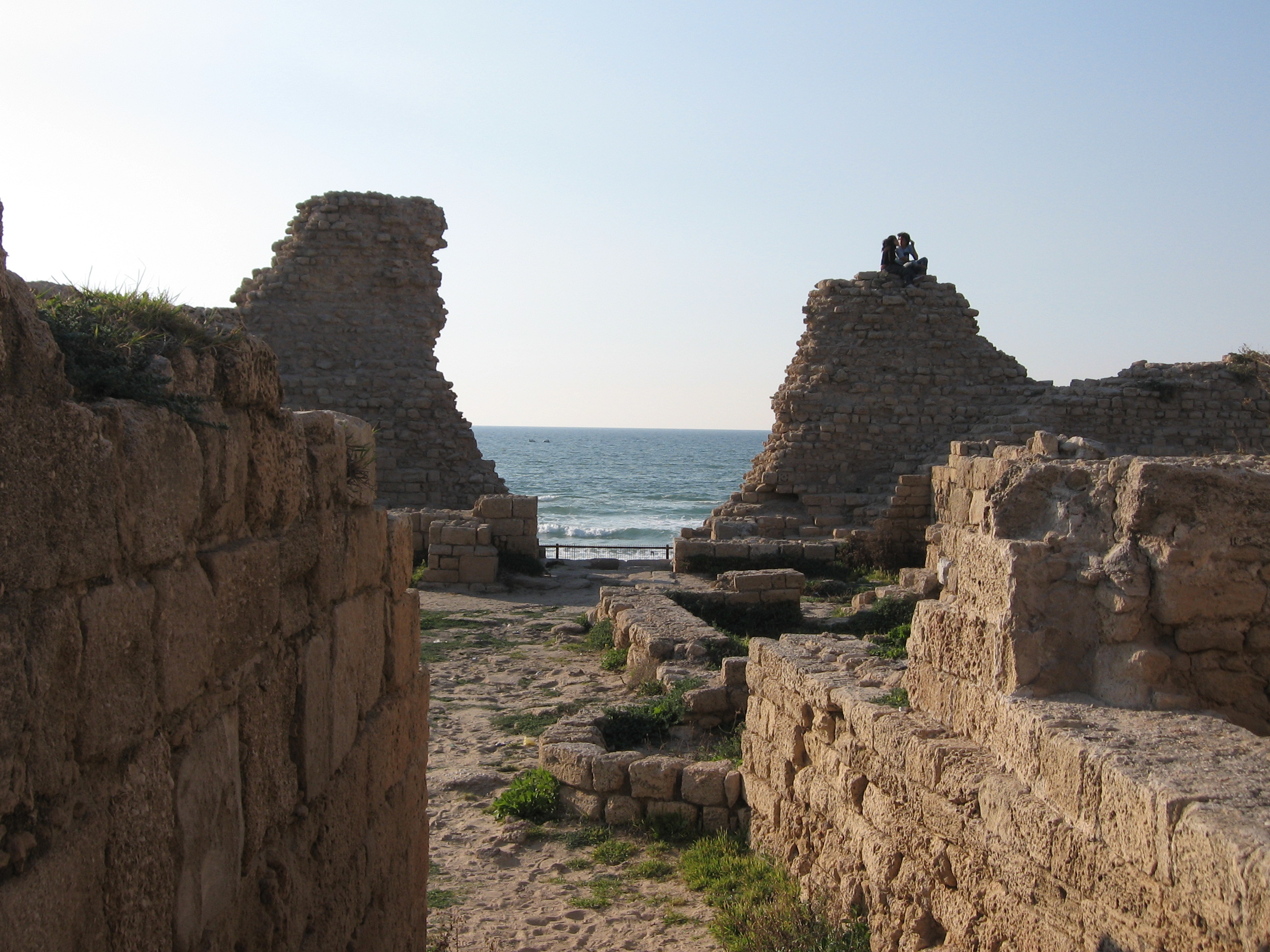
View towards Sea Gate

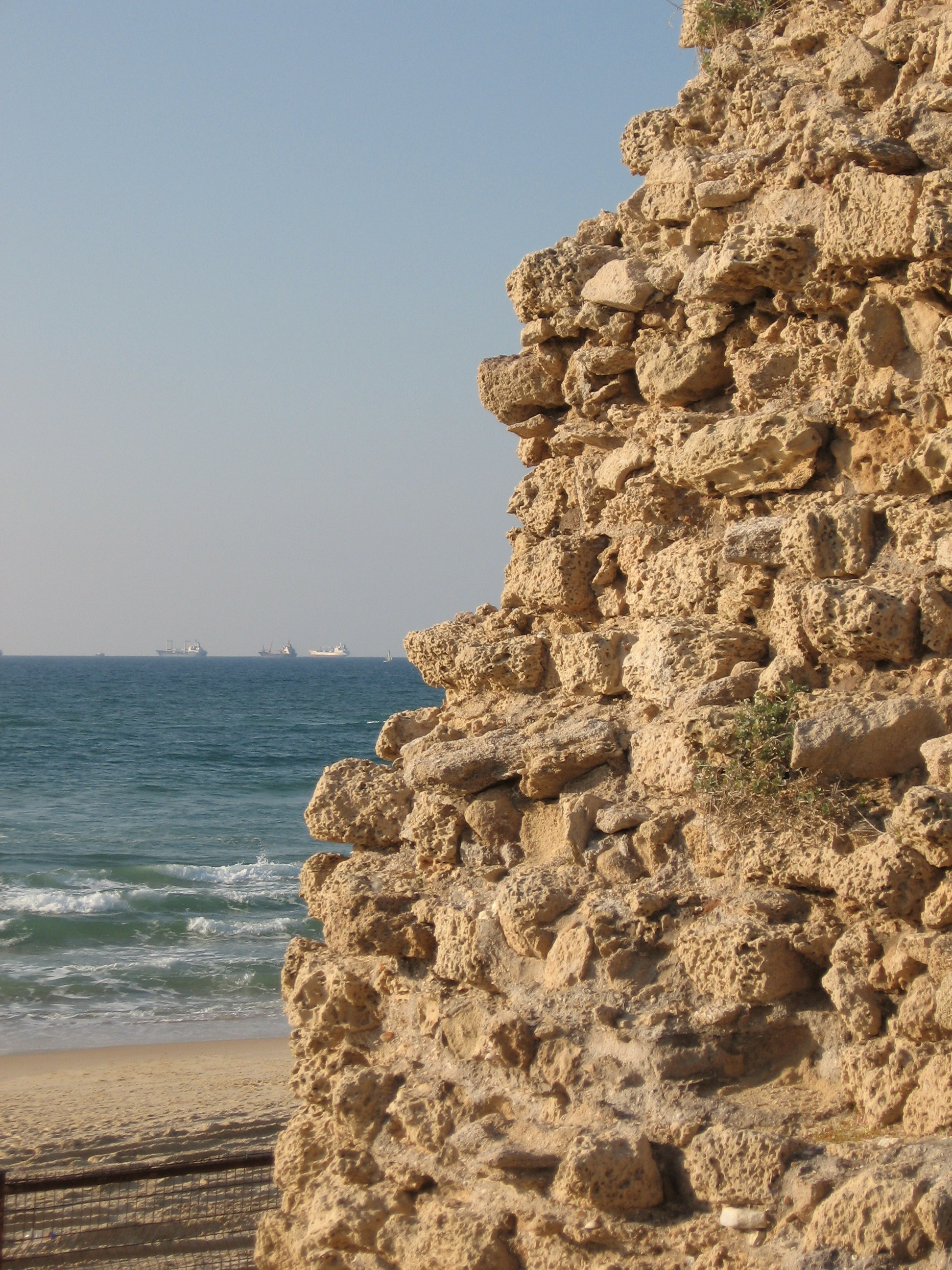
Eroded northern tower of the Sea Gate (or western gate)

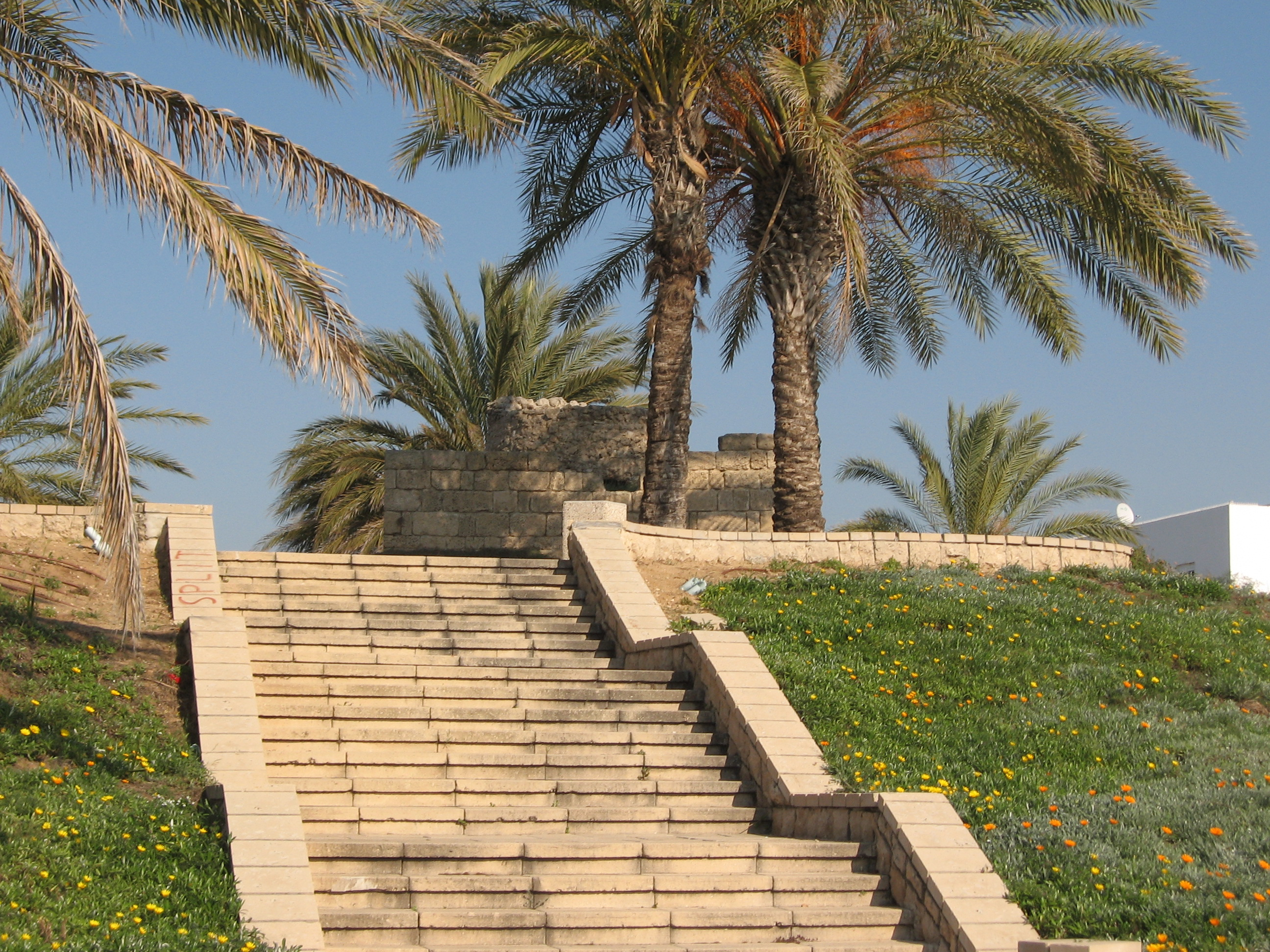
Ashdod, ancient lighthouse which was used in conjunction with the fortress (at top of modern staircase)

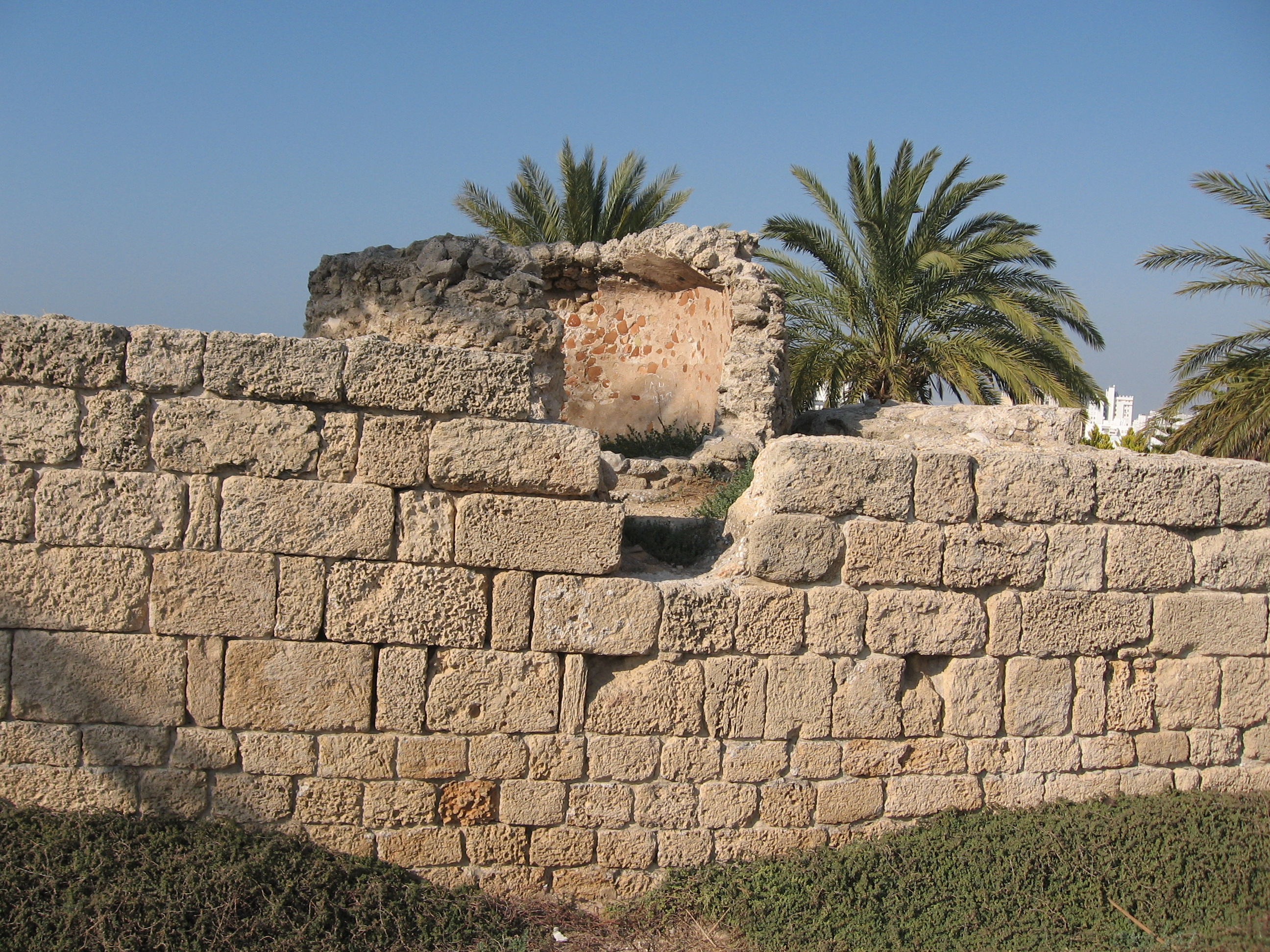
Ashdod, ancient lighthouse which was used in conjunction with the fortress

== Bibliography ==
- Clermont-Ganneau, C.S. (1896). [ARP] Archaeological Researches in Palestine 1873-1874, translated from the French by J. McFarlane. Vol. 2. London: Palestine Exploration Fund.
- Conder, C.R.; Kitchener, H.H. (1882). The Survey of Western Palestine: Memoirs of the Topography, Orography, Hydrography, and Archaeology. Vol. 2. London: Committee of the Palestine Exploration Fund.
- Guérin, V. (1869). Description Géographique Historique et Archéologique de la Palestine (in French). Vol. 1: Judee, pt. 2. Paris: L'Imprimerie Nationale.
- Le Strange, G. (1890). Palestine Under the Moslems: A Description of Syria and the Holy Land from A.D. 650 to 1500. Committee of the Palestine Exploration Fund.
- Mukaddasi (1886). Description of Syria, including Palestine. London: Palestine Pilgrims' Text Society.
- Nahshoni, Pirhiya (2009-11-22). "Ashdod, the Southern Shore (sic, southern beach)". Hadashot Arkheologiyot – Excavations and Surveys in Israel (121).
- Palmer, E.H. (1881). The Survey of Western Palestine: Arabic and English Name Lists Collected During the Survey by Lieutenants Conder and Kitchener, R. E. Transliterated and Explained by E.H. Palmer. Committee of the Palestine Exploration Fund.
- Petersen, Andrew (2001). A Gazetteer of Buildings in Muslim Palestine (British Academy Monographs in Archaeology). Vol. 1. Oxford University Press. ISBN 978-0-19-727011-0.
- Petersen, Andrew (2005). The Towns of Palestine under Muslim Rule: AD 600-1600. BAR International Series 1381.
- Pringle, D. (1997). Secular buildings in the Crusader Kingdom of Jerusalem: an archaeological Gazetter. Cambridge University Press. ISBN 0521-46010-7.
- Röhricht, R. (1893). (RRH) Regesta regni Hierosolymitani (MXCVII-MCCXCI) (in Latin). Berlin: Libraria Academica Wageriana.
- Vunsh, Reuven; Tal, Oren; Sivan, Dorit (8 August 2013). "Hurbatat Ashdod-Yam". Hadashot Arkheologiyot. 125.
