= Iamani =

Philistine king of Ashdod in the 8th century BCE

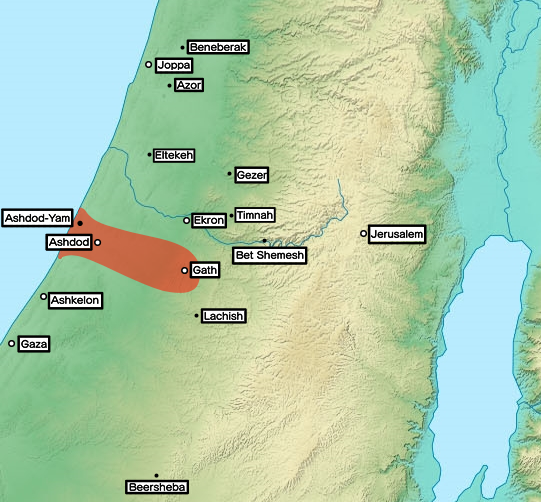
Ashdod's borders during Iamani's reign.

Iamani (Akkadian: 𒅀𒈠𒉌 ia-ma-ni, "Ionian") or Iadna (Akkadian: 𒅀𒀜𒈾 ia-ad-na, "Cypriot") was a Philistine king of Ashdod during the reign of Neo-Assyrian emperor Sargon II. His names, meaning "Ionian" and "Cypriot", seemingly indicate he was of Greek extraction, and therefore a foreigner amongst the Philistines, although the names themselves are Semitic.

According to Sargon II's annals, the emperor had deposed Azuri, the previous king of Ashdod, for plotting to skirt the paying of tribute to Assyria, and replaced him with his brother, Ahi-Miti. However, shortly afterwards, the Hittites apparently invaded Ashdod and placed Iamani, a member of the lower class, on the throne. Much like Azuri, Iamani did not respect Neo-Assyrian suzerainty, and so in c. 712 BCE Sargon marched with his personal retinue to the Levant. When Iamani became aware of the emperor's advance, he fled to Egypt, leaving behind his family. Upon his arrival, Sargon captured Ashdod and Ashdod-Yam, as well as Gath; which Ashdod apparently controlled during Iamani's reign. Incidentally, this is the last time Gath appears in historical records, which may indicate Sargon II's forces destroyed the city rather than simply capturing it. In any event, Sargon's successful invasion marked the end of an independent Philistia, which would now persist under direct Assyrian rule until the empire's collapse.

After Ashdod's capture, Shebitku, the king of Egypt, apparently found Iamani in the midst of a people whom the Assyrians had never heard of, or rather, "[who]se ancestors [from the] distant [past] until now had nev[er s]ent their mounted messenger(s) to the kings, (Sargon II's) ancestors, in order to inquire about their well-being", and captured Iamani and sent him to Assyria for fear that the empire would inflict a similar fate upon Egypt. At this point, Iamani disappears from the annals, and his fate is never mentioned. That said, despite his sedition, Sargon probably allowed him to return to the throne.
