= Isdud =

Depopulated Palestinian village

Isdud / Esdud اسدود
- Former village
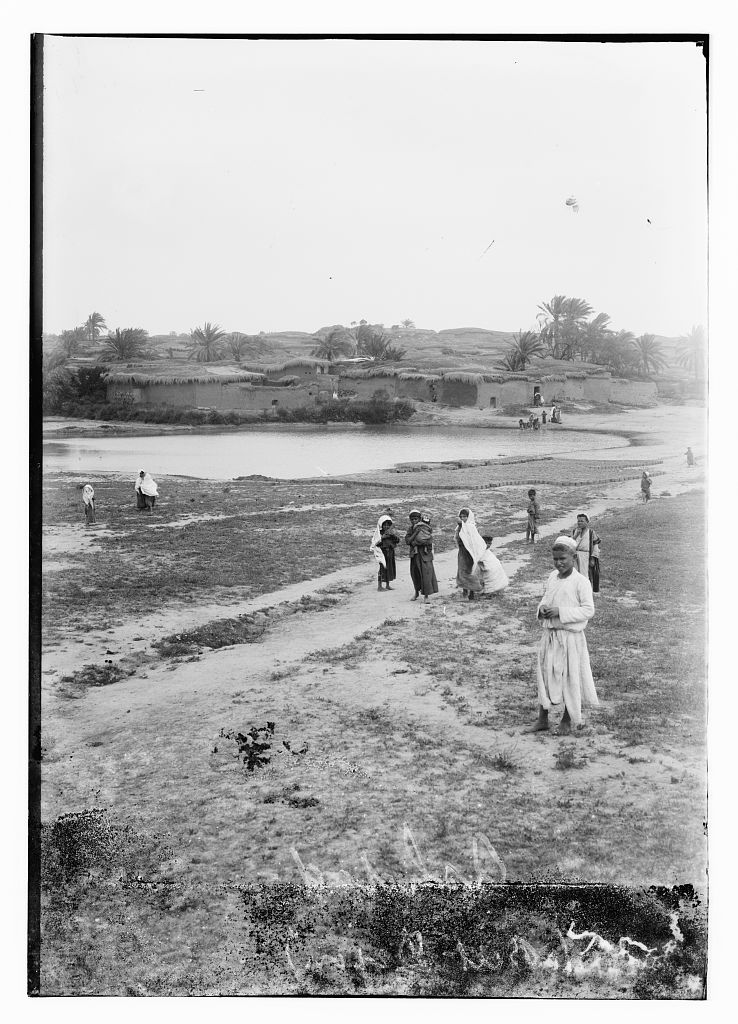
- Isdud, pre-1914

- Location within Mandatory Palestine
- Coordinates: 31°45′13″N 34°39′42″E
- Palestine grid: 118/129
- Geopolitical entity: Mandatory Palestine
- Subdistrict: Gaza
- Date of depopulation: 28 October 1948

Area
  - Total: 7,391 dunams (7.391 km^{2}; 2.854 sq mi)

Population (1945)
  - Total: 4,910
- Cause(s) of depopulation: Military assault by Yishuv forces
- Secondary cause: Fear of being caught up in the fighting
- Current Localities: Sde Uzziyyahu, Shetulim, Bene Darom, and Gan ha-Darom

Isdud (Arabic: إسدود, romanized: ʾisdūd) was a Palestinian village in the region of Tel Ashdod. Its occupants were killed or driven out during the 1948 Arab-Israeli War. Khalidi says it may have had historic links to Azdud, a postal stop between al-Ramla and Gaza, and the ancient city of Ashdod. The name appears in documents from the time of Mamluk-rule in the mid-15th century. In the Ottoman period, there were 75 households. In 1922, it had a population of 2,566 (2,555 Muslims and 11 Christians) and in 1945, 4,620 Arabs and 290 Jews. During the 1948 war, the Arab inhabitants fled.

Today, the village's ruins form part of the Tel Ashdod archaeological site, which lies within the jurisdiction of the Be'er Tuvia Regional Council. The central village mosque stands at the top of the site, as does the khan and the tomb of Sheikh Abu Qubal.

== Names ==
The name "Isdud" is a variant on the name of ancient Ashdod, which is first attested in the form of 11th century BCE Egyptian lists, where is it transcribed as "ísdd", which scholars have determined is derived from the Late Bronze Age Canaanite "'aṯdādu".

In the Islamic period, the geographer Ibn Khordadbeh referred to the city as "Azdud", echoing the pre-Hellenistic name. By the 16th century, it had lost its initial vowel to become just "Sdud", before regaining it by the 19th century as "Esdud," and then "Isdud."

== History ==
=== Ancient and classical period ===
The ancient city of Ashdod rose to prominence in the 12th century BCE, when the Philistines ruled the city as Asdadu and the city was a member of their pentapolis, a group of five key cities. alongside Ascalon, Gaza, Ekron and Gath.

Asdûdu later led the revolt of Philistines, Judeans, Edomites, and Moabites against Assyria, before one of Sargon II's generals destroyed the city and exiled its residents, including some Israelites who were subsequently settled in Media and Elam. In 605 BCE, Babylonian king Nebuchadnezzar conquered it, and in 539 BCE it was rebuilt by the Persians, before being conquered in 332 BCE by Alexander the Great.

During the Hellenistic period, the city was known as Αzotus (Greek: Άζωτος) and prospered until the Maccabean Revolt, during which Judas Maccabeus took the city and "laid it waste". It was then ruled by Alexander Jannaeus of the Hasmoneans, before being made independent again by the Roman general Pompey. In 55 BCE, the Roman general Gabinius also helped to rebuild Azotus.

During the Byzantine period, Azotus was overshadowed by Azotus Paralios, a nearby port and the inland city's maritime counterpart. The 6th-century Madaba Map shows both under their respective names.

=== Early Islamic period ===
The geographer Ibn Khordadbeh (c. 820 – 912) referred to the inland city as "Azdud" and described it as a postal station between al-Ramla and Gaza.

=== Crusader period ===
12-century Crusader church endowments and land deeds mention settlement in Azotum/Azdūd.

=== Mamluk period ===
Isdūd was very likely occupied without interruption starting in the 1200s CE. During the Mamluk period, Isdud was a key village along the Cairo—Damascus road, which served as a center for rural religious and economic life.

=== Ottoman period ===
In the Ottoman period, the location of the village of Isdud on the ancient "Via Maris" route preserved the village's importance. In the first Ottoman tax register of 1526/7, the village had a population of 40 Muslim households and four bachelors, and it belonged to the nahiya of Gaza (Gaza Sanjak). Sixteenth-century Ottoman fiscal registers from Isdūd document a diversified subsistence economy that included the cultivation of staple field crops such as wheat, barley, and sesame, alongside fruit tree planting, small livestock herding (sheep and goats), and apiculture. By 1596 CE, the population of Ashdod (named Sdud) reached 75 households, about 413 persons, all Muslims. The villagers paid a fixed tax rate of 33,3% on wheat, barley, sesame and fruit crops, as well as goats and beehives; a total of 14,000 Akçe.

Marom and Taxel have shown that during the seventeenth to eighteenth centuries, nomadic economic and security pressures led to settlement abandonment around Majdal 'Asqalān, and the southern coastal plain in general. The population of abandoned villages moved to surviving settlements, while the lands of abandoned settlements continued to be cultivated by neighboring villages. Thus, Isdud absorbed the lands of Kharijat Isdud, an unidentified subsidiary settlement near Isdud mentioned in the Ottoman tax registers.

In 1838, Esdud was noted as a Muslim village in the Gaza district.

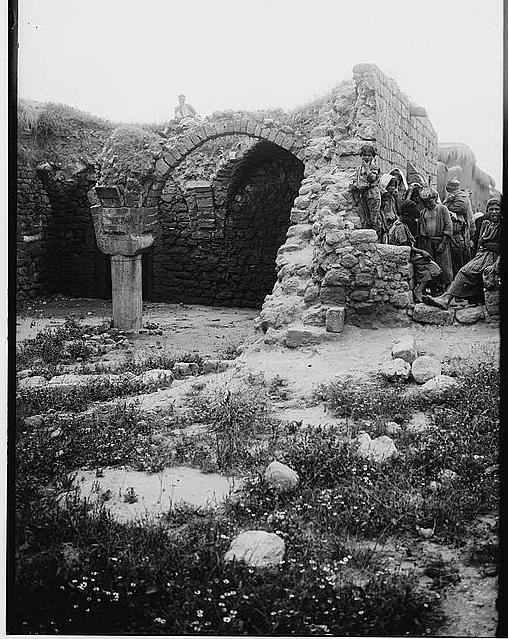
Ruins of medieval Isdud, in 1900

Isdūd was one of the large, stable settlements situated along the Cairo–Damascus route. However, is caravanserai had fallen into ruin by the mid-19th century as the old imperial road declined in importance.

During the latter half of the nineteenth century CE, Isdud was organized into four distinct quarters, each led by a headperson from one of the village's major clans: the Da‘ālisa, Zaqqūt/Zaqāqita, Manā‘ima, and Jūda, which were further divided into smaller family groups. This division into quarters was a common feature of larger settlements in the region, also observed in neighboring Hamāma and al-Majdal.

In the late nineteenth century, Isdud was described as a village spread across the eastern slope of a low hill, covered with gardens. A ruined khan stood southwest of the village. Its houses were one-storey high with walls and enclosures built of adobe brick. There were two main sources of water: a pond and a masonry well. Both were surrounded by groves of date-palm and fig-trees.

Rimal Isdud, the coastal sand dunes of Isdud were cultivated using traditional Palestinian agricultural techniques adapted to sandy and shifting soils. Local farmers developed systems such as mawāsī (plot-and-berm cultivation), kurūm (vineyards), and basātīn (orchard gardens), which enabled sustainable farming in ecologically marginal landscapes. These methods combined indigenous knowledge with environmental adaptation strategies, including the stabilization of dunes and the strategic planting of drought-resistant crops. Contrary to colonial-era perceptions of the dunes as barren wastelands, recent studies have highlighted the productivity and ecological sophistication of these traditional land-use practices, contributing to a broader reevaluation of Palestinian agrarian history in the southern Levant.

== Excavation ==
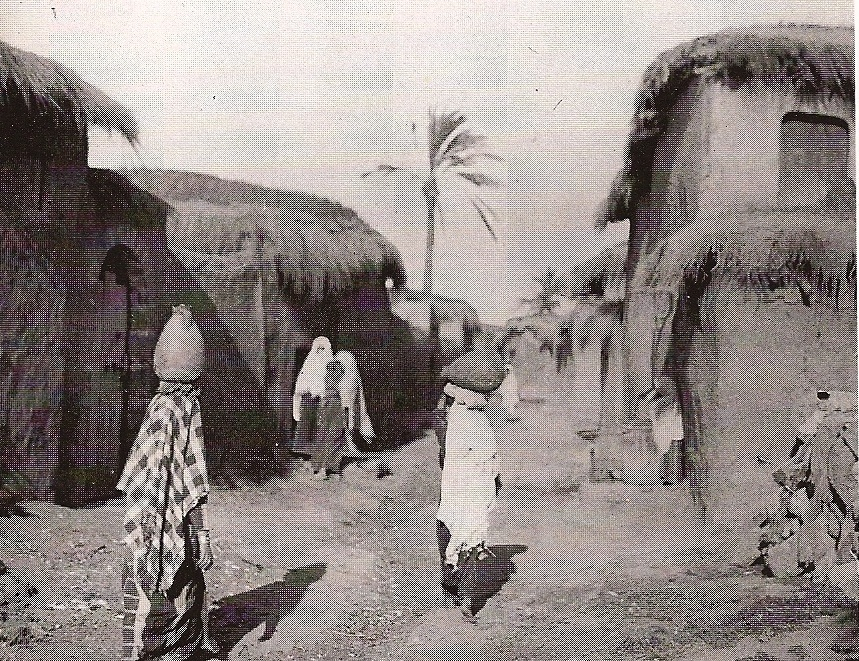
Isdud, c. 1914–1918

=== British Mandate ===
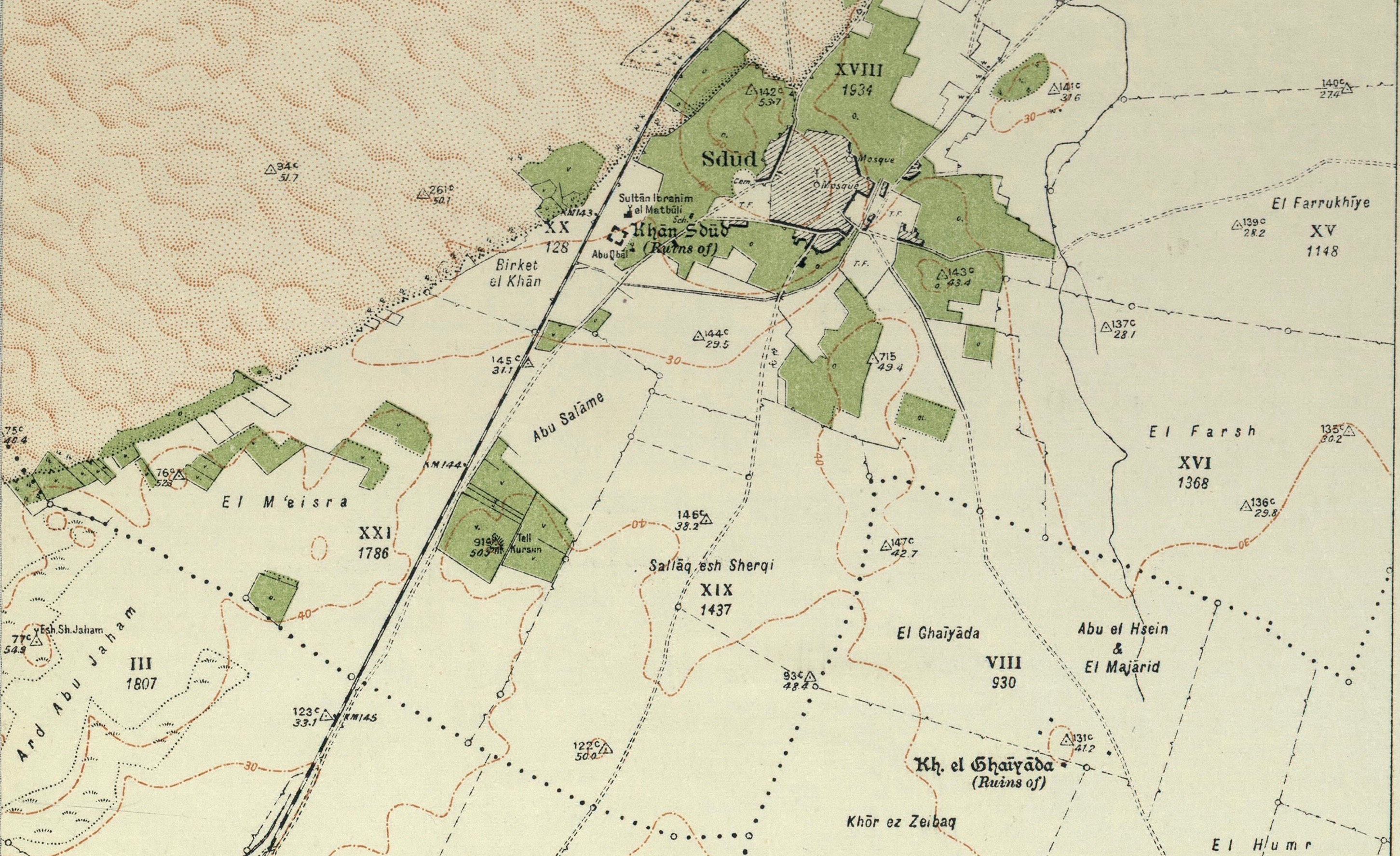
Isdud 1930 1:20,000

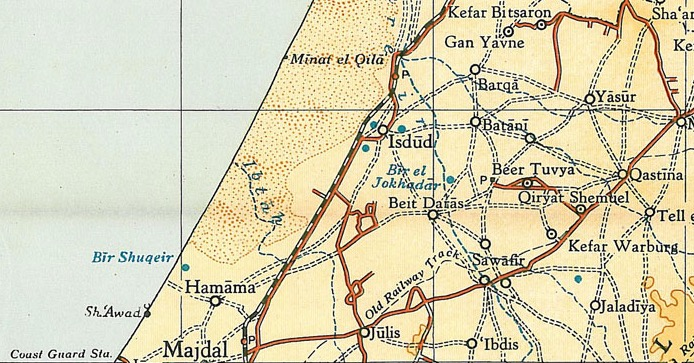
Isdud 1945 1:250,000

In the 1922 census of Palestine, conducted by the British Mandate authorities, Isdud had a population of 2,566 inhabitants; 2,555 Muslims and 11 Christians, where the Christians were all Catholics.

The population increased in the 1931 census to 3,240; 3,238 Muslims and 2 Christians, in a total of 764 houses.

During the Mandatory period, Isdud had two elementary schools; one for boys which was opened in 1922, and one for girls which started in 1942. By the mid-1940s the boy-school had 371 students, while the girl-school had 74.

The official Village Statistics, 1945 for "Isdûd" gave a population of 4,620 Arabs and 290 Jews in a total land area of 47,871 dunams [4,787.1 hectares (11,829 acres)]. Of this, 3,277 dunams were used for citrus and bananas, 8,327 for plantations and irrigable land, 23,762 for cereals, while 131 dunams were built-on land.

In addition to agriculture, residents practiced animal husbandry which formed an important source of income for the town. In 1943, they owned 480 heads of cattle, 117 sheep over a year old, 50 goats over a year old, 169 camels, 18 horses, 21 mules, 328 donkeys, 5790 fowls, and 3079 pigeons.

=== 1948 Arab–Israeli War ===
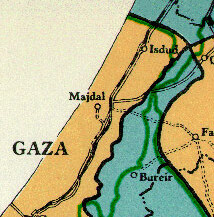
The area around Isdud and Majdal had been allocated to the Arab state in the United Nations Partition Plan for Palestine

The village of Isdud was occupied by the Egyptian army on May 29, 1948, and became the Egyptians' northernmost position during the 1948 Arab-Israeli War. While the Israelis failed to capture territory, and suffered heavy casualties, Egypt changed its strategy from offensive to defensive, thus halting their advance northwards. Egyptian and Israeli forces clashed in the surrounding area, with the Egyptians being unable to hold the Ad Halom bridge over the Lachish River. Israeli forces surrounded the town during Operation Pleshet, and shelled and bombed it from the air. For three nights from 18 October the Israeli Air Force bombed Isdud and several other locations. Fearing encirclement, Egyptian forces retreated on October 28, 1948, and the majority of the residents fled. The 300 townspeople who remained left southwards in expectation of the Israel Defense Forces push towards Egypt. The village was part of territory that was granted to Israel in the 1949 Armistice Agreements following the end of the war.

=== Israel ===
In 1950, two moshavim, Sde Uziyahu and Shtulim, were established to the east of Isdud, on village land. Bnei Darom (in 1949) and Gan HaDarom (in 1953) were established north of Isdud, on village land. The city of Ashdod was founded in 1956 4 kilometers (2.5 mi) north of Isdud.

In 1992, Isdud was reported as destroyed, with only a few ruined buildings including the village mosque remaining.

== Gallery ==
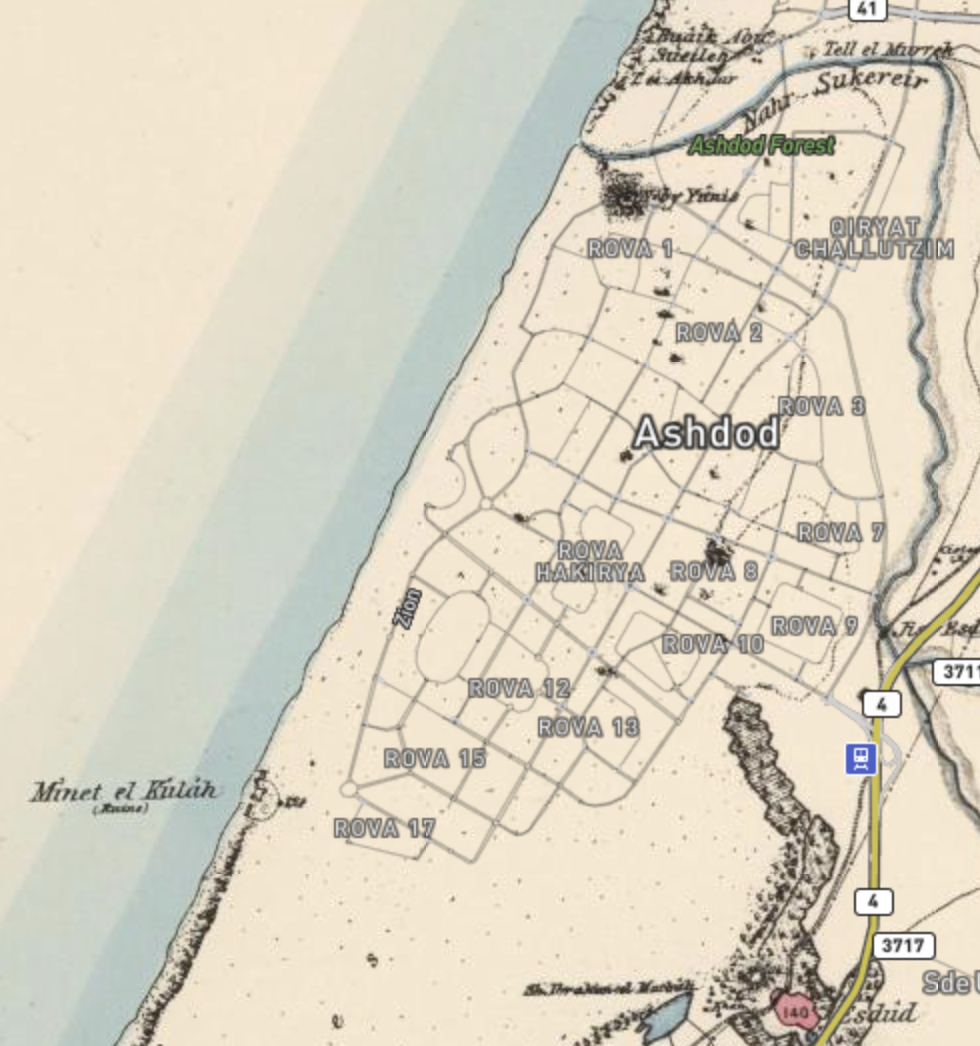
Isdud (Esdud) in 1870, at the bottom of the map, compared against the location of modern Ashdod

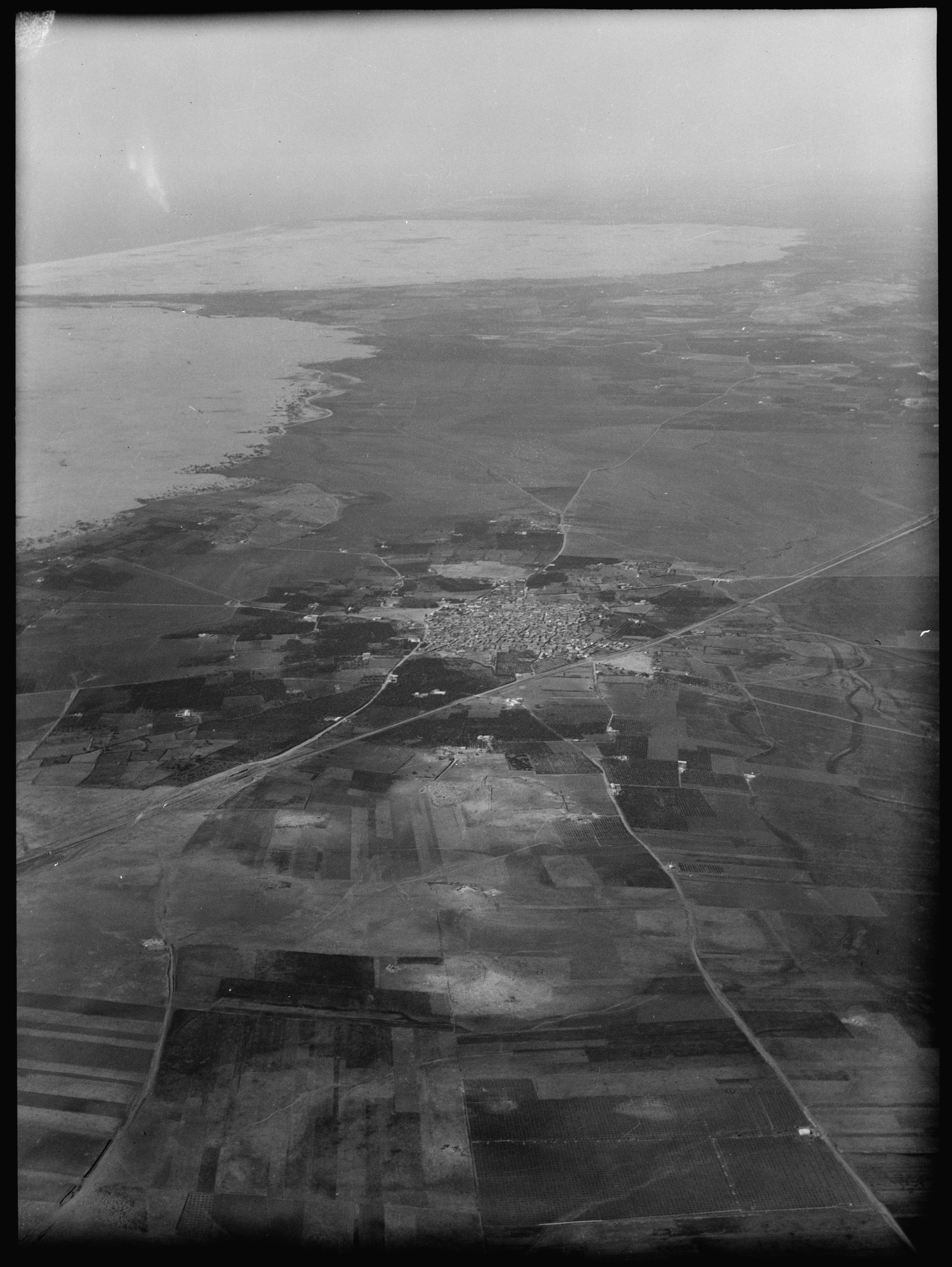
Aerial view of Isdud, 1932

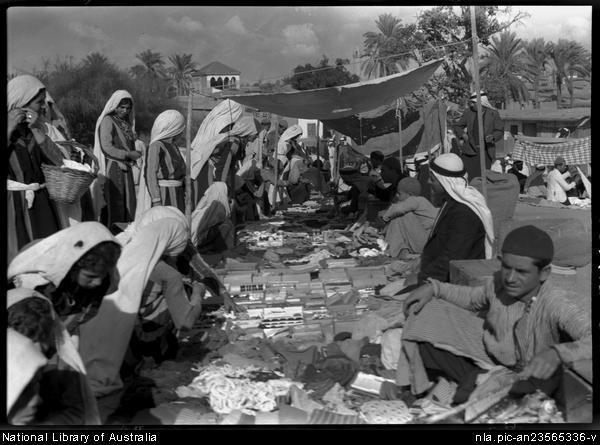
Isdud fair in 1939

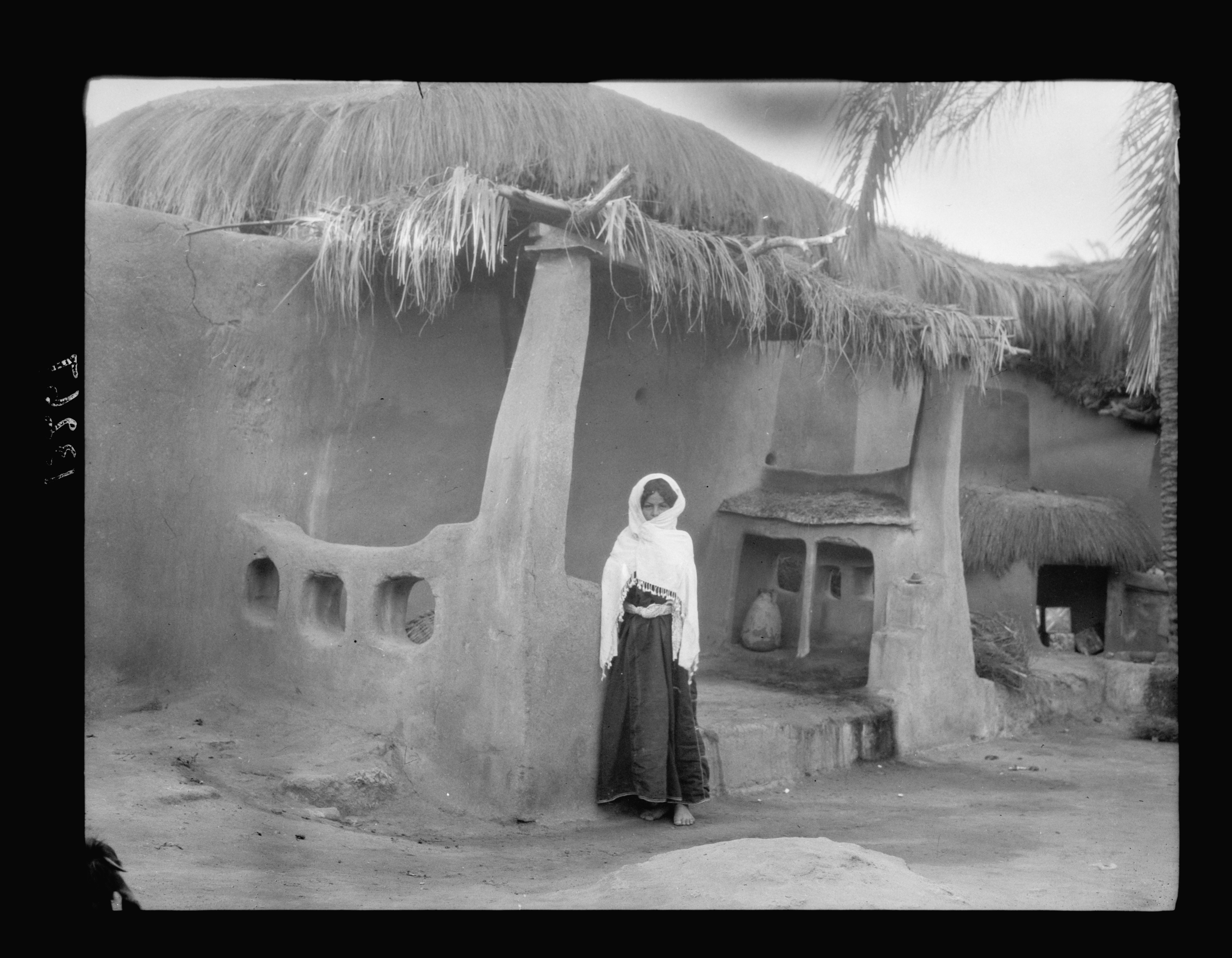
Courtyard of house in Isdud, about 1945

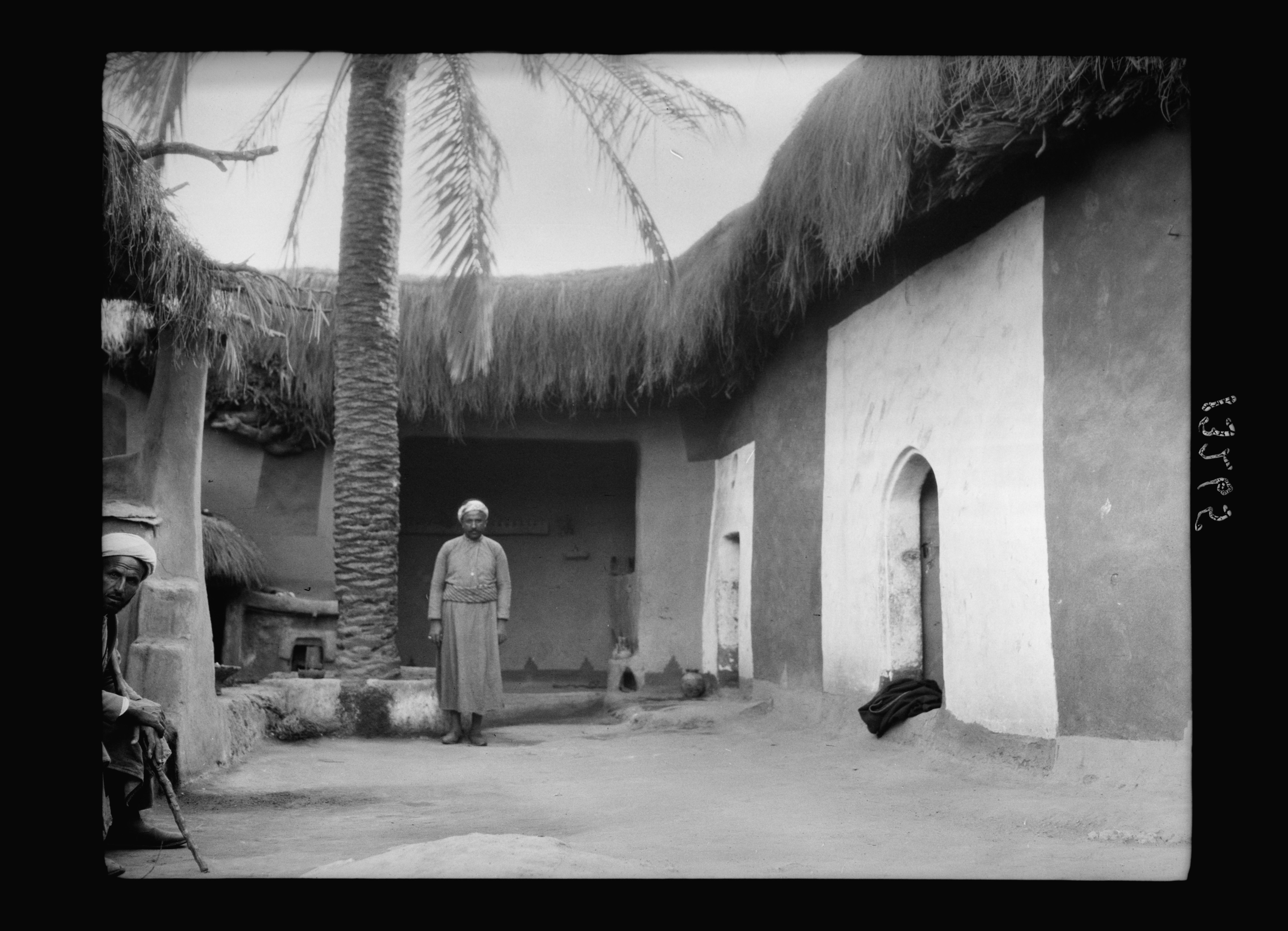
Courtyard of house in Isdud, about 1945

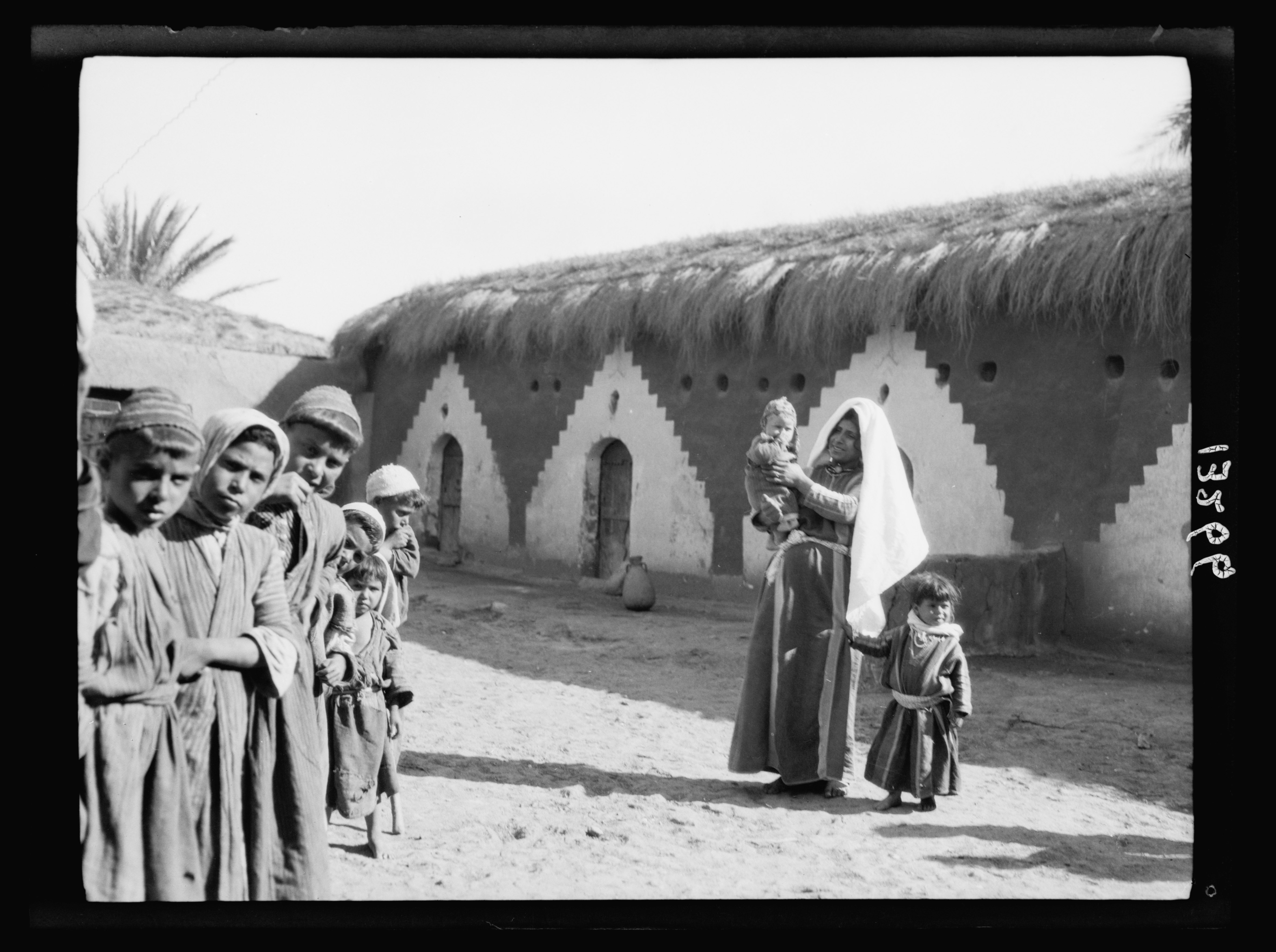
Typical house courtyard in the 1940's

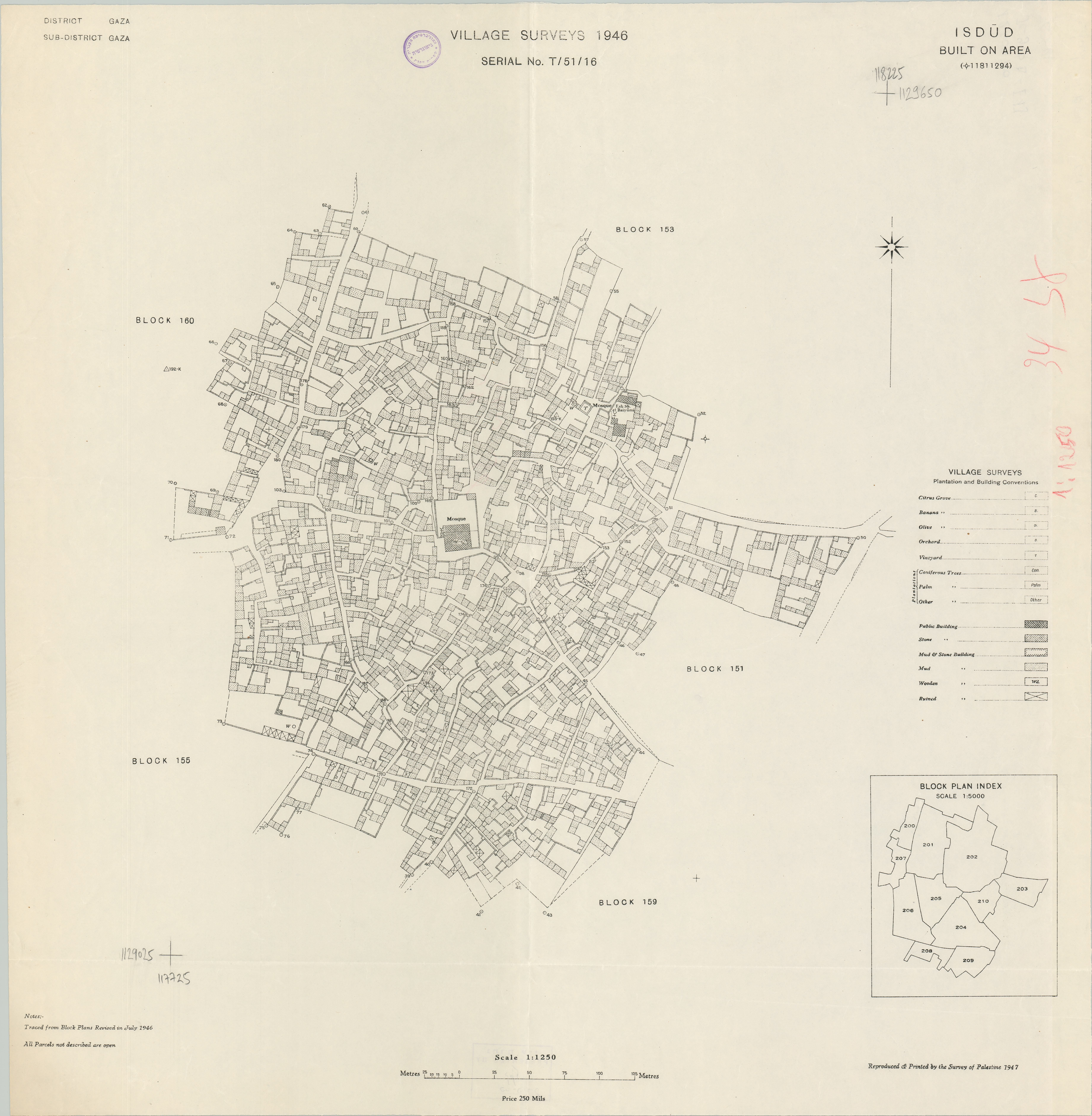
Detailed village map, 1946

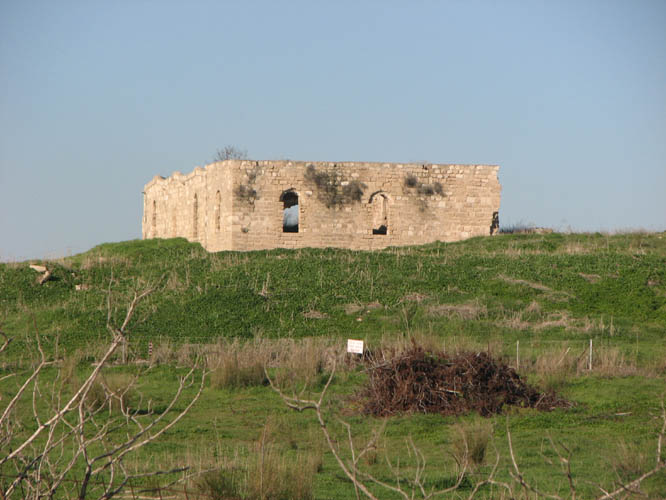
Ruins of the Isdud mosque

== See also ==
- List of Arab towns and villages depopulated during the 1948 Arab-Israeli War
