= Ashdod (ancient city) =

Ancient Levantine city

Ashdod / Azotus / Isdud
- اسدود (Arabic)
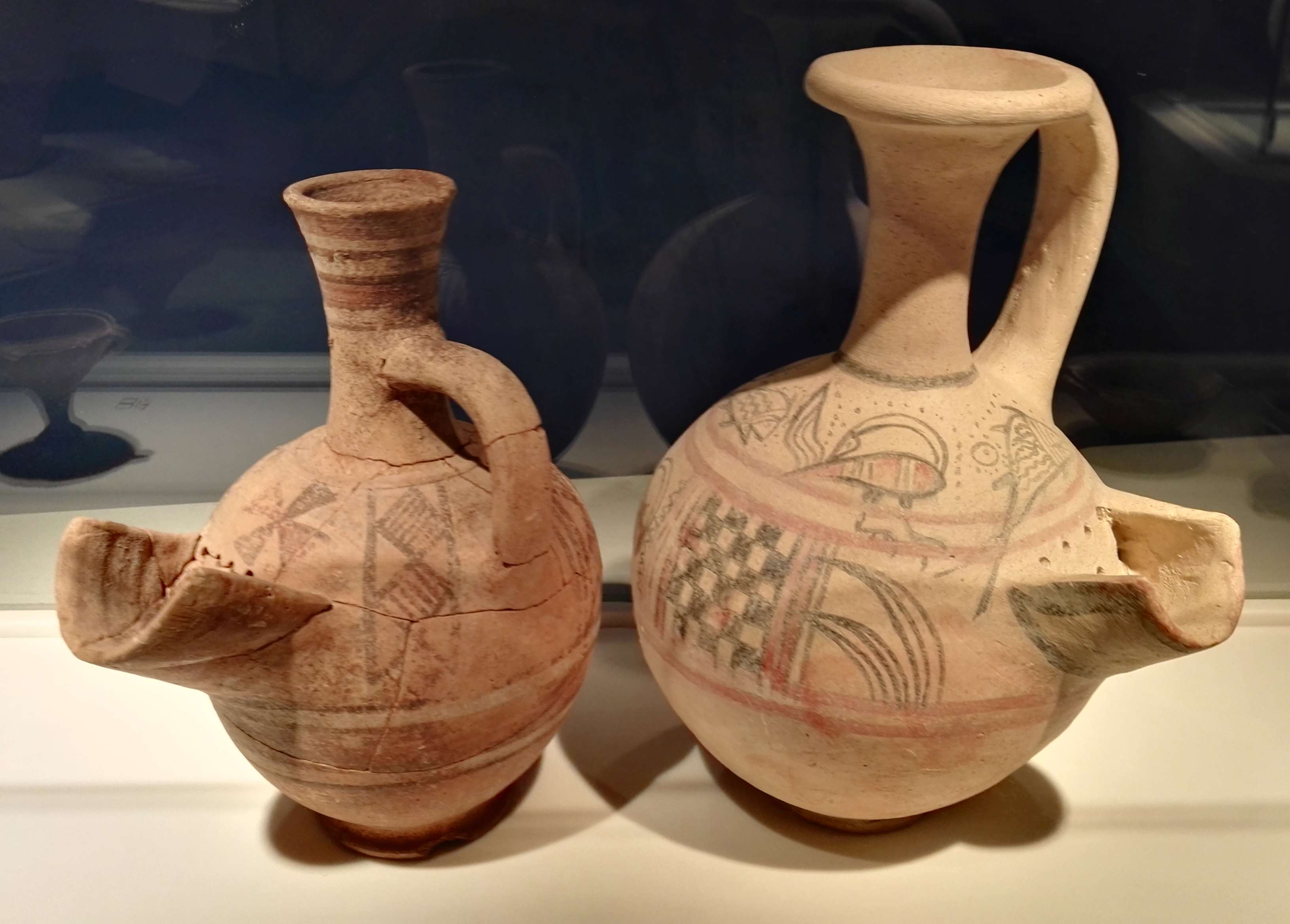
- Philistine pottery at the Museum of Philistine culture, Ashdod, Israel

- Location within Israel Location within Levant
- 31°45′13″N 34°39′42″E
- Type: Ancient Levantine city
- Location: Ashdod, Israel
- Region: Levant

Ashdod (Philistine: 𐤀𐤔𐤃𐤃 *ʾašdūd; Hebrew: אַשְׁדּוֹד, romanized: ʾašdōḏ; Arabic: أسدود, romanized: ʾasdūd) or Azotus (Koine Greek: Ἄζωτος, romanized: azōtos) was an ancient Levantine metropolis, the remains of which are situated at Tel Ashdod, an archaeological site located a few kilometers south of the modern Ashdod in present-day Israel.

The first documented urban settlement at Ashdod dates to the 17th century BCE, when it was a fortified Canaanite city, before being destroyed in the Bronze Age Collapse. During the Iron Age, it was one of the five cities of the Philistine pentapolis, and is mentioned 13 times in the Hebrew Bible. After being captured by Uzziah, it was briefly ruled by the Kingdom of Judah before changing hands between the Neo-Assyrian Empire, the Neo-Babylonian Empire and the later Achaemenid Empire.

Following the conquests of Alexander the Great, the city became Hellenized, and was known as Azotus. It was later incorporated into the Hasmonean kingdom. In the 1st century BCE, Pompey removed the city from Judean rule and annexed it to the Roman province of Syria. In 30 BCE, Ashdod came under Herod's rule, who bequeathed it to his sister Salome I, a decision later confirmed by Augustus. During the First Jewish–Roman War, Vespasian subdued and garrisoned the town. Ashdod was a bishopric under Byzantine rule, but its importance diminished over the course of the medieval period.

In the Ottoman period, this was the site of the former and now depopulated Palestinian village of Isdud. There was ongoing habitation at the site in the early modern period through to the 1948 Arab-Israeli War, when Isdud was depopulated after its inhabitants fled or were expelled. Today, the site is an archaeological site that is open to the public, with visible remains of Isdud and earlier historical ruins thought to date back to the Philistine period.

== Name evolution ==
The ancient Levantine settlement of Ashdod had many names. Its first attestation comes in the form of 11th century BCE Egyptian lists, where is it transcribed as "ísdd", which scholars have determined is derived from the Late Bronze Age Canaanite "’aṯdādu". This became "asdudu" or "asdūdu" in Assyrian records, "ašdudu" in Babylonian cuneiform and "ášdadi" in Ugaritic. The Hebrew "’ašdōd", or "Ashdod", is likewise believed to be derived from the Canaanite form.

In the Hellenistic period, the name of the settlement became "Azotus" in Greek and sometimes specifically "Azotus Mesogaias", literally "Inland Azotus", in contrast to Azotus Paralios, literally "Azotus-by-the-sea", or Ashdod-Yam in Hebrew. In the Early Muslim period, the geographer Ibn Khordadbeh referred to the city in the 9th century as "Azdud", echoing the pre-Hellenistic name. By the 16th century, it had lost its initial vowel to become just "Sdud", before regaining it by the 19th century as "Esdud" – a form of the settlement's name that changed little through to the 20th century "Isdud".

== History ==
In archaeological terms, Area G (acropolis) and Area C (lower town) provides strata. Ashdod eventually had two harbors at Tel Mor and Ashdod-Yam. Nahal Lakhish (Lakhish river) served as a trade route from Ashdod inland to Lakhish (35 km, 2 two days donkey caravan) in the Shephelah.

=== Early Bronze Age ===
Early Bronze IB (c. 3300-3000 BCE). An agricultural village/rural settlement in Area C with fertile land and water. The ceramic assemblage include jars and blows typical of the southern Levantine tradition. The settlement is unfortified, with a cluster of simple broad-room houses and stove-paved floors (cf. nerby site 'En Shaddud). The nearby city of Tel Erani (25 ha, 22 km) was a hub for Egyptian trade.

Early Bronze III-IV (2750-2020/2000 BC). Occupational gap.

=== Middle Bronze Age ===
Middle Bronze I (c. 2020/2000-1820 BCE). Occupational gap.

Middle Bronze IIB. Stratum XXIV. The earliest major habitation in Ashdod dates to the 17th century BCE. While traces of occupation exist below XXIII, they are often described as pre-fortification or fragmentary MB IIB remains, mostly found as fills or small-scale habitation.

==== Hyksos period ====
Middle Bronze IIC (c. 1600-1550 BCE). Stratum XXIII is specifically the phase where the city was first founded as a fortified urban center on the acropolis (occupying roughly 8 hectares). From an Egyptian perspective MB IIC corresponds with the late "Hyksos period" or Second Intermediate Period, a transitional phase from the Middle Bronze Age to the Late Bronze Age.

Ashdod was fortified in with a two-entryway city gate (similar to Shechem). The gate found in Area G is built of mudbricks on a stone foundation. This turned the site from a village into a city-state during the final phase of the Middle Bronze Age

=== Late Bronze Age ===
Late Bronze I. Stratum XXII. The gate continued to be used into the beginning of the Late Bronze Age, though it underwent repairs.

The eventual abandonment or destruction of this gate marks the transition into the Late Bronze Age II, where Egyptian influence begins to dominate the stratigraphic record (Strata XX–XIX).

The destruction of XXII (c. 1470/1450 BCE) by fire was due to the military campaigns of Thutmose III of Egypt, marking the transitional LB IB/LB IIA.

Stratum XXI (LB IIA). Amarna period. Stratum XX (LB IIA/B). Late 18th dynasty.

==== Egyptian period ====
In the Late Bronze II, Ashdod was part of the Egyptian Empire. Strata XV-XIV (LB II) has yielded a small amount of Egyptianized pottery.

At Ugarit, Ashdod is first mentioned in written documents, indicating that the city was a center of export for dyed woolen purple fabric and garments.

Stratum XV (LB IIB). Seti I and Ramesses II. Area G (Acropolis). Contemporary with the 19th Dynasty of Egypt. The Governor's Residence (Building 4110) was a massive building identified as a "palace" or a high-status administrative residency with a layout similar to Tel Aphek or Beth-Shean. International trade show Ashdod's importance as a maritime port, with imported luxury goods (including Mycenaean IIIB pottery and Cypriot Base-Ring II and White Slip II wares).

Stratum XIV (LB IIB). Late 19th Dynasty. Ramesses II and Merneptah.

Stratum XIIIB (LB IIB final). Early 20th Dynasty. Ramesses III of Egypt.

Destruction. Late Bronze Age Collapse. A thick layer of ashes, charred beams, and collapsed mudbricks covers the LB IIB remains. At the end of the 13th century BCE, the Sea Peoples conquered and destroyed Ashdod. By the beginning of the 12th century BCE, the Philistines, generally thought to have been one of the Sea Peoples, ruled the city. During their reign, the city prospered and was a member of the Philistine Pentapolis ('five cities'), which included Ashkelon and Gaza on the coast and Ekron and Gath farther inland, in addition to Ashdod.

=== Iron Age I ===
The Iron Age city had a six-chambered gate, first excavated by Moshe Dothan in the 1960 and recently re-exposed.

==== Philistine period ====
In Iron IA, the Philistines had gained control of Ashdod. Strata XIIIb is characterized by locally produced Mycenaean IIIC pottery and no Egyptianized pottery. The Fall of the Egyptian Empire in the Southern Levant during the 20th Dynasty was on full display. The Nahal Lachish seem to be the northern border of Ashdod. On the other side Tel Mor was still held by pro-Egyptians. The material culture of these two sites so close together show different cultures with little contact.

Stratum XII (Iron IB). Contemporary with 21st Dynasty of Egypt.

=== Iron Age II ===
Overall, the city remained independent of Judean and Israelite rule up until the Hellenistic period.

==== Kingdom of Ashdod ====
Around 950 BCE, Ashdod Stratum X (IA IB/IIA) was destroyed during Pharaoh Siamun's conquest of the region. The city was not rebuilt until at least 815 BCE.

==== Assyrian period ====
Asdûdu led the revolt of Philistines, Judeans, Edomites, and Moabites against Assyria after expulsion of king Ahi-Miti, whom Sargon had installed instead of his brother Azuri. Gath (Gimtu) belonged to the kingdom of Ashdod at that time. Assyrian king Sargon II's commander-in-chief (turtanu), whom the King James Bible calls simply "Tartan" (Isaiah 20:1), regained control of Ashdod in 712/711 BCE and forced the usurper Yamani to flee. Sargon's general destroyed the city and exiled its residents, including some Israelites who were subsequently settled in Media and Elam.

Mitinti (Akkadian: 𒈪𒋾𒅔𒋾 mi-ti-in-ti; Philistine: 𐤌𐤕𐤕 *Mītīt or *Matīt) was king at the time of Sargon's son Sennacherib (r. 705–681 BCE), and Akhimilki in the reign of Sennacherib's son Esarhaddon (r. 681–669 BCE).

==== Egyptian period ====
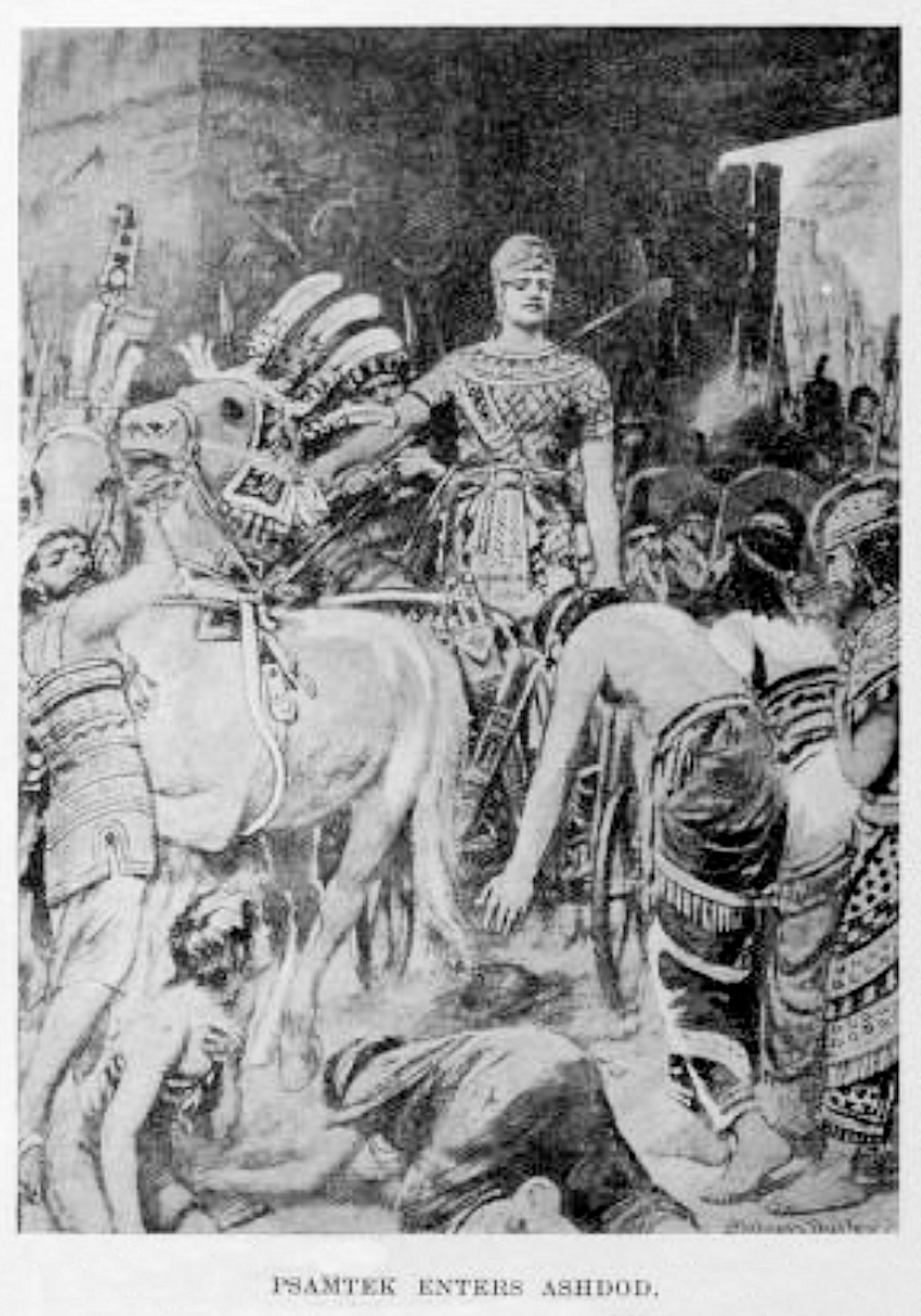
Egyptian ruler Psamtik I during the fall of Ashdod in 635 BCE, illustration by Patrick Gray, 1900.

Psamtik I of Egypt (r. 664 – 610 BCE) is reported to have besieged the great city of "Azotus" for twenty-nine years (Herodotus, ii. 157); the biblical references to the remnant of Ashdod (Jeremiah 25:20; cf. Zephaniah 2:4) are interpreted as allusions to this event.

==== Babylonian period ====
The city absorbed another blow in 605 BCE, when Nebuchadnezzar of Babylonia conquered it. Under Babylonian rule it was a province.

=== Classical Age ===
==== Persian period ====
In 539 BCE the city was rebuilt by the Persians.

==== Hellenistic period ====
In 332 BCE the city was conquered in the wars of Alexander the Great.

During the Hellenistic period through to the late medieval period, the city was known to the Greeks as Αzotus (Greek: Άζωτος) or Azotus Mesogaios (literally "inland Azotus"). It was also known as Hippinos (literally "of the horsemen"), to the Romans.

Despite its location four miles (6 km) from the coast, Ptolemy (c. 90 – c. 168 CE) described the Hellenized city as a maritime city, as did Josephus in Antiquities. Josephus also describes Ashdod as "in the inland parts". This curious contradiction may refer to Ashdod's control of a separate harbor, called "Azotus Paralios", or Ashdod-on-the-Sea (παράλιος - "paralios", Greek for "on the coast").

Azotus prospered until the Maccabean Revolt, during which Judas Maccabeus took the city and "laid it waste". His brother Jonathan Maccabaeus conquered it again in 147 BCE and destroyed the temple of Dagon associated with a Biblical story about the Philistine captivity of the Ark. During the rule of Alexander Jannaeus, Ashdod was part of his territory. The succession wars between Hyrcanus II and Aristobulus II wreaked destruction on Azotus.

==== Roman period ====
Pompey restored the independence of Azotus, as he did with all Hellenising coastal cities. A few years later, in 55 BCE, after more fighting, Roman general Gabinius helped rebuild Ashdod and several other cities left without protective walls. In 30 BCE Ashdod came under the rule of King Herod, who then bequeathed it to his sister Salome. This was later confirmed by Augustus. By the time of the First Jewish–Roman War (66–70), there was evidently a significant Jewish presence in Ashdod, prompting Vespasian to station a garrison in the city in the spring of 68.

=== Byzantine period ===
During the Byzantine period, Azotus Paralios overshadowed its inland counterpart in size and importance. The 6th-century Madaba Map shows both under their respective names.

The prominence of Hellenised, then Christian Azotus continued until the 7th century.

The city was represented at the Council of Chalcedon by Heraclius of Azotus.

=== Early Muslim period ===
Azotus came under Muslim rule in the 7th century.

The geographer Ibn Khordadbeh (c. 820 – 912, Early Muslim period) referred to the inland city as "Azdud" and described it as a postal station between al-Ramla and Gaza.

=== Crusader and Mamluk periods ===
12-century Crusader church endowments and land deeds mention settlement in Azotum. During the Mamluk period, Isdud was a key village along the Cairo—Damascus road, which served as a center for rural religious and economic life.

=== Ottoman period ===
During the Ottoman period, the site was the location of a village, whose position on the Via Maris contributed to its importance. In 1596 CE, administered by nahiya ("subdistrict") of Gaza under the liwa' ("district") of Gaza, the population of Ashdod (named Sdud) numbered 75 households, about 413 persons, all Muslims. The villagers paid a fixed tax rate of 33,3% on wheat, barley, sesame and fruit crops, as well as goats and beehives; a total of 14,000 Akçe.

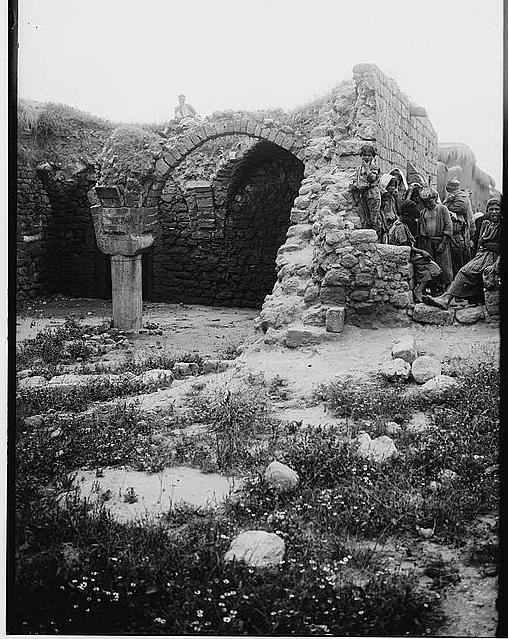
Ruins of medieval Isdud, in 1900

In the late nineteenth century, Isdud was described as a village spread across the eastern slope of a low hill, covered with gardens. A ruined khan stood southwest of the village. Its houses were one-storey high with walls and enclosures built of adobe brick. There were two main sources of water: a pond and a masonry well. Both were surrounded by groves of date-palm and fig-trees.

==== British Mandate ====
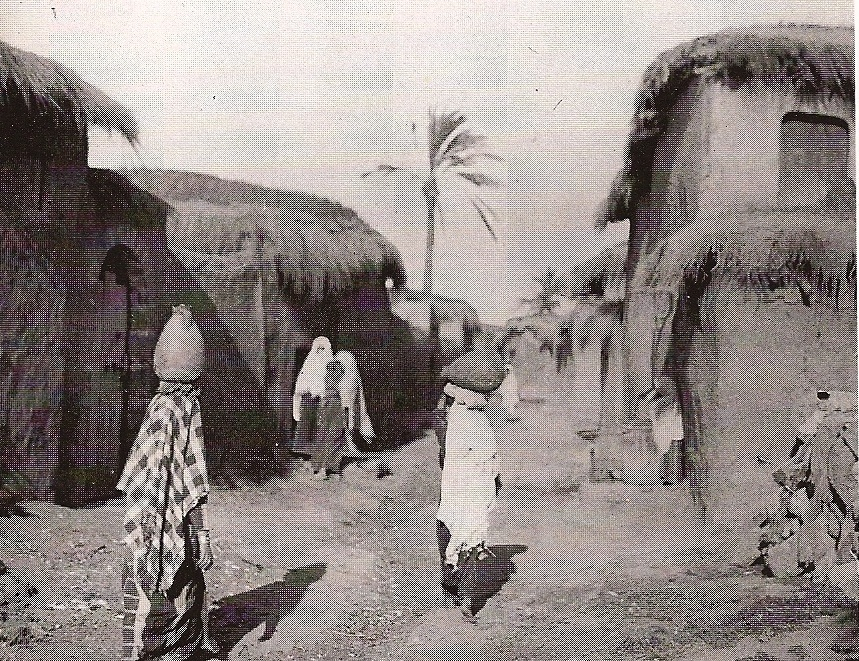
Isdud, c. 1914–1918

In the 1922 census of Palestine, conducted by the British Mandate authorities, Isdud had a population of 2,566 inhabitants; 2,555 Muslims and 11 Christians, where the Christians were all Catholics. The population increased in the 1931 census to 3,240; 3,238 Muslims and 2 Christians, in a total of 764 houses.

==== 1948 Arab-Israeli War ====
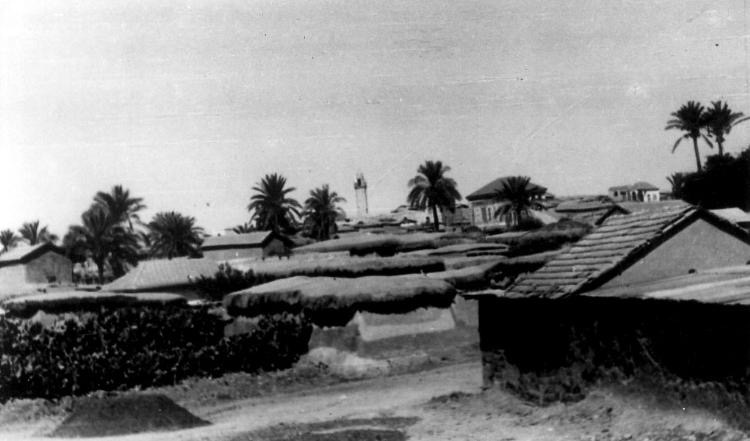
Isdud 1948

The village of Isdud was occupied by the Egyptian army on May 29, 1948, and became the Egyptians' northernmost position during the 1948 Arab-Israeli War. While the Israelis failed to capture territory, and suffered heavy casualties, Egypt changed its strategy from offensive to defensive, thus halting their northward advance. Egyptian and Israeli forces clashed in the surrounding area, with the Egyptians being unable to hold the Ad Halom bridge over the Lachish River. Israeli forces surrounded the town during Operation Pleshet, and shelled and bombed it from the air. For three nights from 18 October the Israeli Air Force bombed Isdud and several other locations. Fearing encirclement, Egyptian forces retreated on October 28, 1948, and the majority of the residents fled. The 300 townspeople who remained were driven southwards by the Israel Defense Forces. The village was part of territory that was granted to Israel in the 1949 Armistice Agreements following the end of the war.

== Biblical references ==
The Book of Nehemiah, referring to events in the 5th century BCE, mentions the Ashdodites and the speech of Ashdod, which half of the children from mixed families are described as adopting. Hugo Winckler explains the use of that name by the fact that Ashdod was the nearest of the Philistine cities to Jerusalem.

In Joshua 11, Ashdod is listed among the cities assigned to the Tribe of Judah (Joshua 11:21-22)

In I Samuel 6:17 Ashdod is mentioned among the principal Philistine cities. After capturing the Ark of the covenant from the Israelites, the Philistines took it to Ashdod and placed it in the temple of Dagon. The next morning Dagon was found prostrate before the Ark; on being restored to his place, he was on the following morning again found prostrate and broken. The people of Ashdod were smitten with boils; a plague of mice was sent over the land (1 Samuel 6:5).

The 1st century CE Book of Acts refers to Azotus as the place in which Philip the Evangelist reappeared after he converted the Ethiopian eunuch to Christianity.

== Archaeology ==
Ancient Ashdod has today become an archaeological site known as "Tel Ashdod", located a few kilometers south of the modern Israel city of Ashdod. It was excavated by archaeologists in nine seasons between 1962 and 1972. The effort was led during the first few years by David Noel Freedman of the Pittsburgh Theological Seminary and Moshe Dothan. The remaining seasons were headed by Dothan for the Israel Antiquities Authority.
