= Ashdod-Yam =

Ancient Levantine port city and archaeological site

- אשדוד ים (Hebrew)
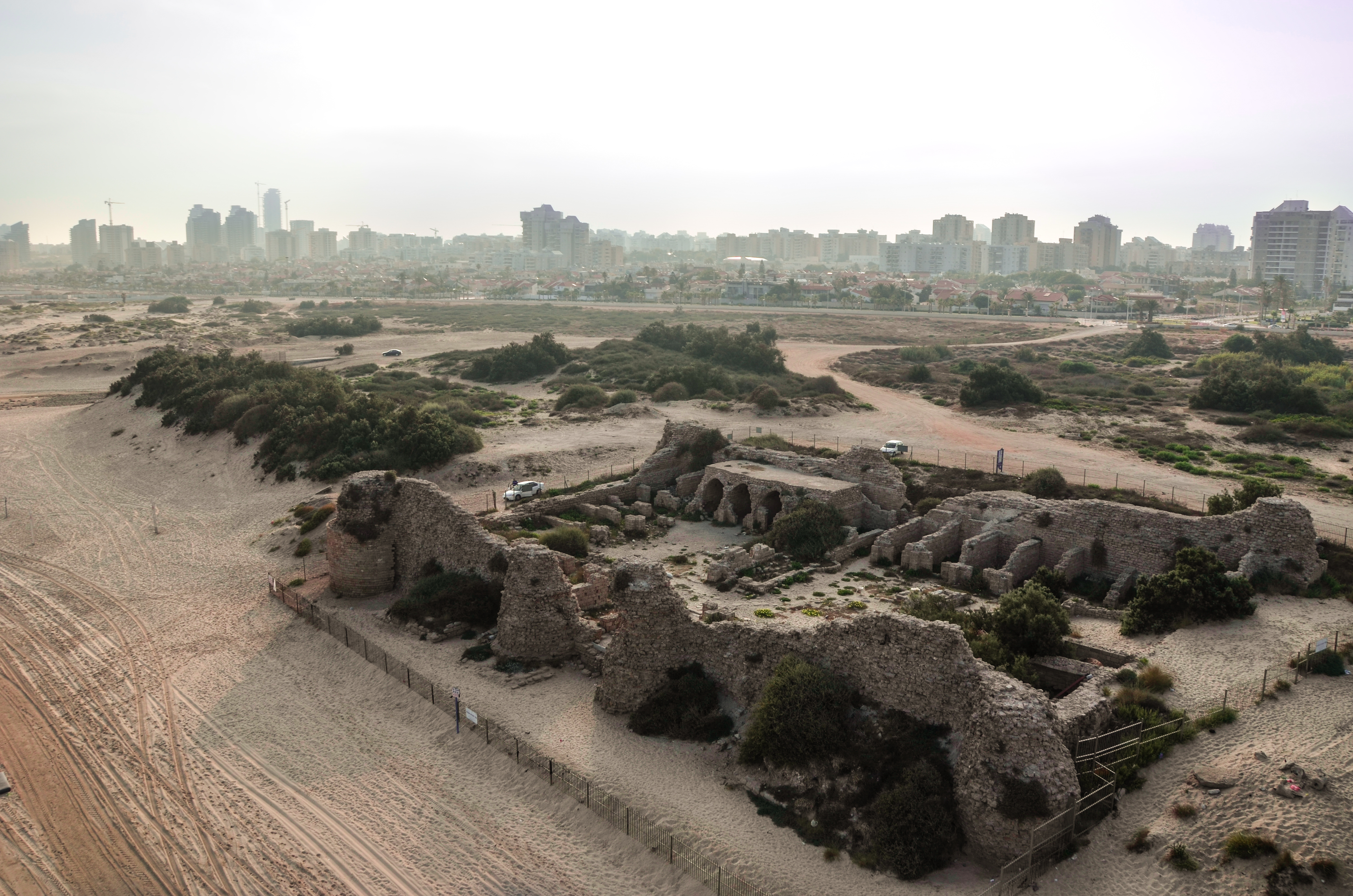
- Aerial view of Minat al-Qal'a

- Location within Ashkelon region of Israel Location within Israel
- 31°46′49″N 34°37′17″E
- Type: Port city, fortress
- Cultures: Philistine, Assyrian, Hellenistic, Roman, Byzantine, Arab, Crusader
- Location: Ashdod, Israel

Site notes
- Material: Stone
- Excavation dates: 1965-1968, 2012
- Condition: Partial preservation, buried in sand

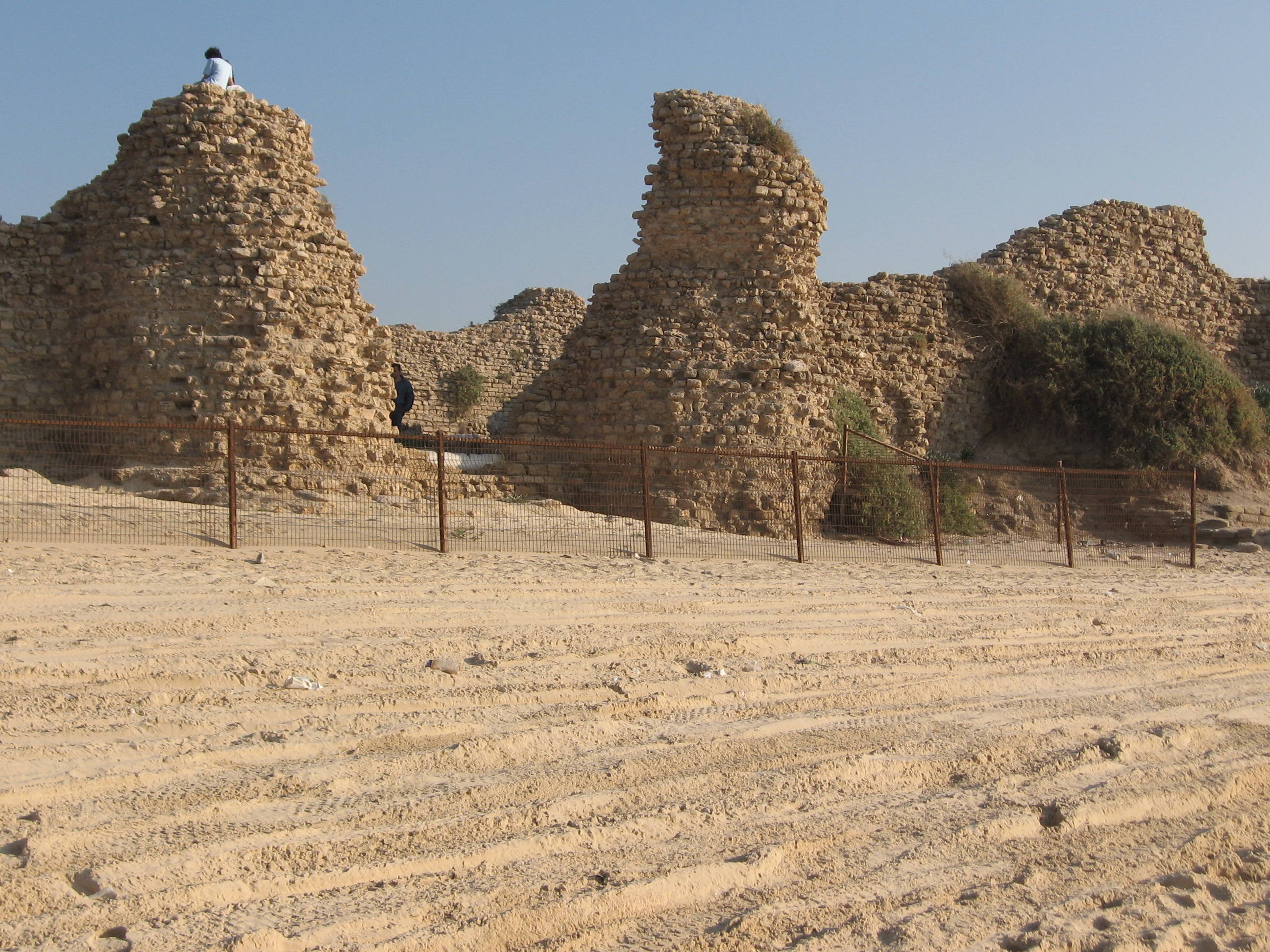
Western façade of the castle with the sea gate flanked by towers

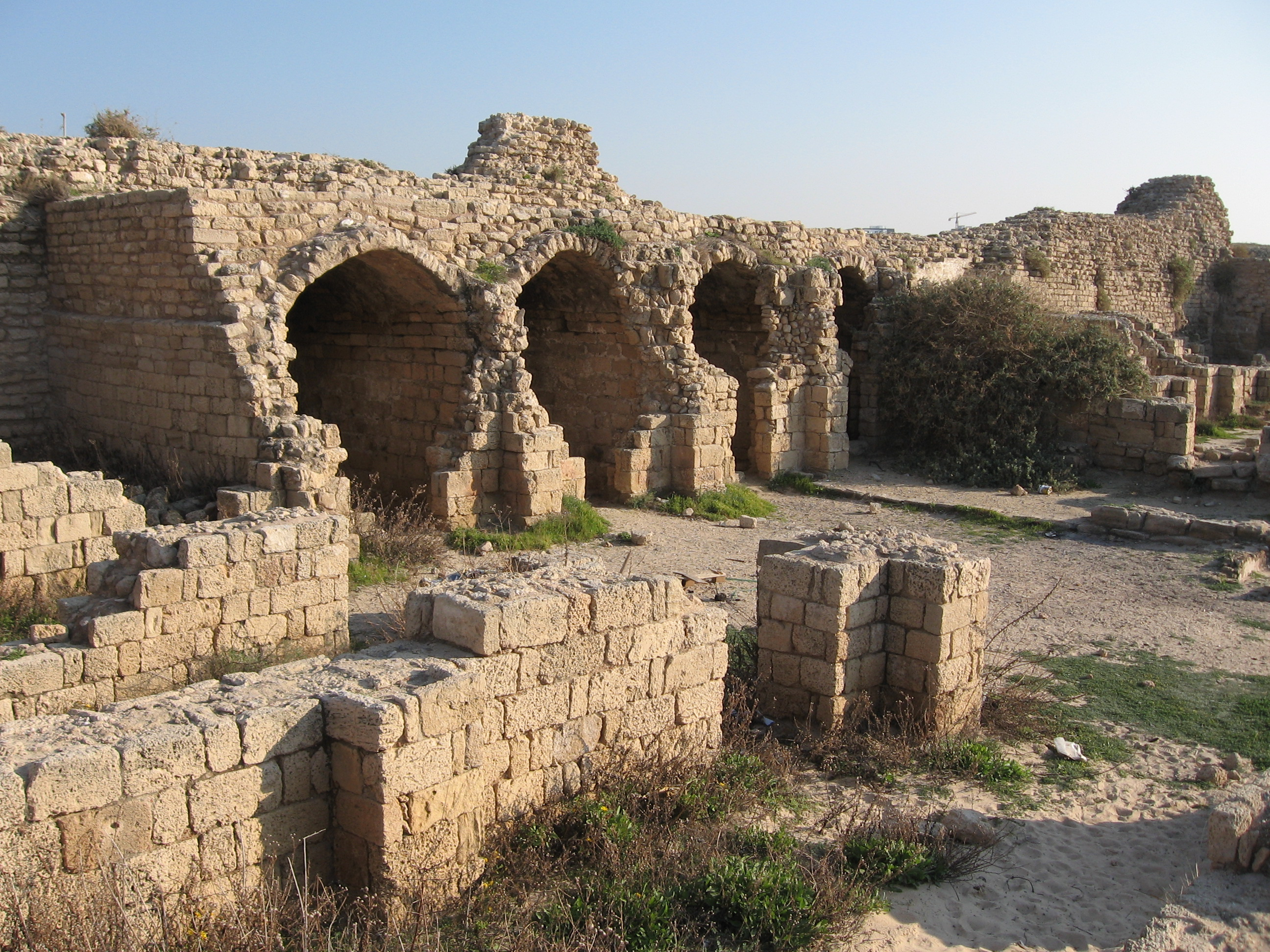
Storerooms inside the castle.

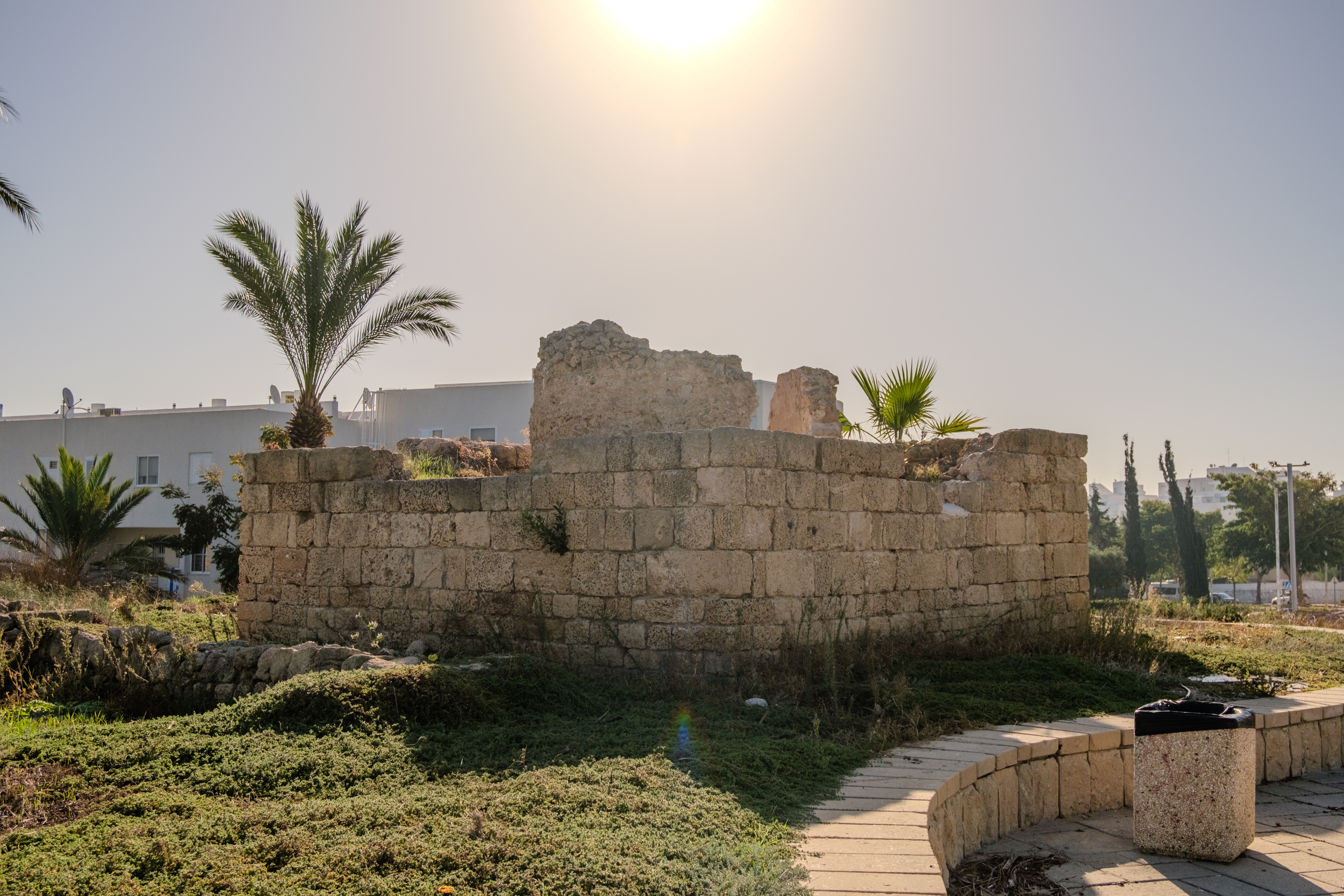
Ruins of the ancient lighthouse used in conjunction with the castle, located in modern residential Quarter 15.

Ashdod-Yam (Greek: Άζωτος παράλιος, romanized: Azotus Paralios, lit. 'Ashdod on the Sea') is an ancient port city on the Mediterranean coast of Israel, located in the southern part of the modern city of Ashdod, and about 5 kilometres northwest of the ancient site of Tel Ashdod, where ancient Ashdod stood in the time of the Philistines. Ashdod-Yam and its inland counterpart, Ashdod or Azotus Mesogaios (Άζωτος Μεσόγειος), were for most of their history two closely connected but distinct entities. Much of the surrounding environ is covered by sand dunes and remains unexplored.

== Names ==
The ancient Levantine settlement of Ashdod-Yam had several names. In Assyrian records, it is attested as "asdudi-immu", corresponding to the Hebrew "’ašdód-yam". The first part of the name, "Ašdod", is believed to be derived from the Late Bronze Age Canaanite "’aṯdādu".

In the Hellenistic period, the name of the settlement became "Azotus Paralios", literally "Azotus-by-the-sea", in contrast to Azotus Mesogaias, literally "Inland Azotus". In the Islamic period, it became "Mahuz Azdud", literally "harbour of Azdud", a combining the ancient Aramaic word for harbour, mahuz, and "Azdud".

During the Crusades, as property of the lord of Ramla, Hugh, it was bequeathed to the knight Nicolas de Beroard and became known as "Castellum Beroart". Its contemporary Arabic name is "Minat al-Qal'a", after the Umayyad-era fort that was built at the site and whose ruins remain partially intact to this day.

== History ==
The two towns, Ashdod and Ashdod-Yam, have been connected throughout their history. Despite the antiquity of the place, the name Ashdod-yam was applied to the site and adjacent town in October 1955, by Israel's Government Naming Committee.

=== Late Bronze Age ===
During the Late Bronze Age the inland city of Ashdod used a port facility near the mouth of the Lakhish River, at Tel Mor, as its main exit to the sea, while a smaller port was probably located at Ashdod-Yam.

=== Iron Age ===
During the Iron Age the roles gradually reversed, and Ashdod-Yam, located south of Ashdod, overtook in importance the port at Tel Mor, located north of Ashdod. As one of the main five cities of the Philistine Pentapolis, Ashdod had great regional significance.

Ashdod-Yam is first mentioned in documents from the time of Sargon II of Assyria when in 713 BCE the Assyrian king speaks of having to depose a usurper who had taken over control of the city of Ashdod and had fortified three towns: Ashdod itself, Gath, and "Asdudimmu" (Ashdod-Yam).

=== Hellenistic through Byzantine period ===
In 63 BCE, when general Pompey restored to Ashdod its independence previously lost to the Hasmonean king John Hyrcanus, the city consisted of two twin towns, the regional center of Azotos Mesogeios or A. Hippenos (lit. "inland Ashdod" and "Ashdod of the horsemen" respectively), and Azotos Paralios (lit. "coastal Ashdod"; also written A. Paralus, Paralius) The town, under its Greek designation, appears in the Madaba Map of the 6th century.

This arrangement persisted throughout the Byzantine period, when the port town actually overshadowed in importance its former mother-city further inland: the bishops of Azotos present at the First Council of Nicaea in 325 and the council of Jerusalem in 536 seem to have resided in Azotos Paralios rather than in Azotos Mesogeios. Remains from Azotos Paralios of the Byzantine period, including a 1.500-year-old Greek dedication to a large church, were found over 2 km north of the inland Iron Age site. The inscription was discovered between two modern houses, about a mile from the coast. According to a medieval Christian Georgian calendar, a four-line Greek mosaic inscription dated back to "the 3rd indiction, year 292", which corresponds to the 6th century AD on the Gregorian calendar. The 6th-century Madaba Map shows both cities under their respective names. The prominence of Hellenised, then Christian Azotus continued until the 7th century, when it came under Muslim rule. The city was represented at the Council of Chalcedon by Heraclius of Azotus.

A chancel screen from a synagogue from the 6th century CE testifies to the existence of a Jewish community at Ashdod-Yam during the Byzantine period.

In November 2017, archaeologists discovered a church, later fully excavated and called “Church of the Deaconesses.” An inscription was discovered between two modern houses, about a mile from the coast. According to a medieval Christian Georgian calendar, a four-line Greek mosaic inscription dated back to "the 3rd indiction, year 292", which corresponds to the 6th century AD on the Gregorian calendar. Archaeologists thought they could have found the remains of the Roman-Byzantine city of Ashdod-Yam. In 2021 excavations at the site of a Byzantine-era Christian basilica revealed "splendid" mosaics and tombs dug beneath the floors. The mosaics provide evidence of women serving as ministers and deacons of the church. The burials included mass-graves of bodies covered in lime, believed to have been used to inter victims of the Plague of Justinian.

=== Early Muslim, Crusader, and Mamluk periods ===
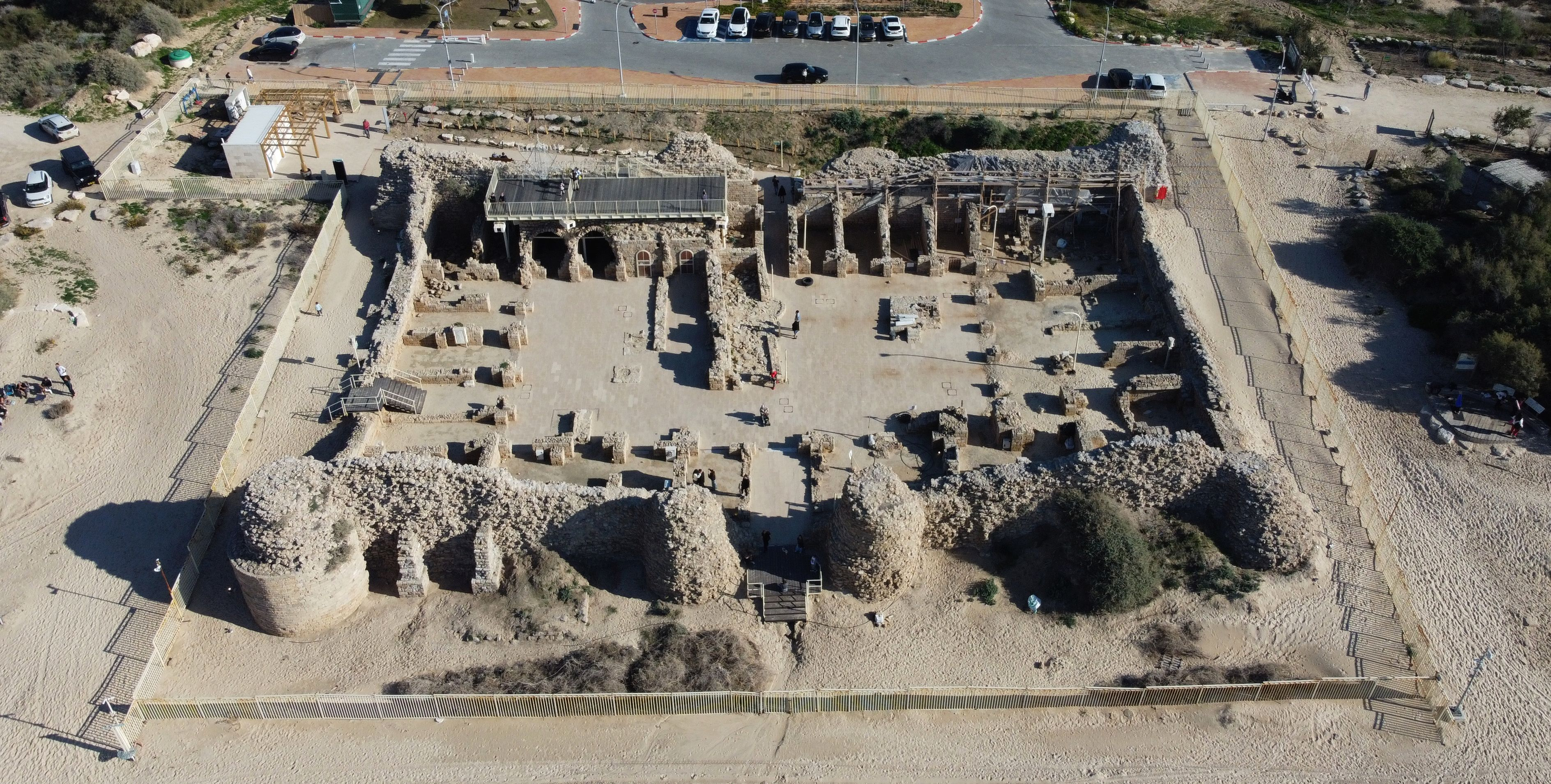
Aerial view of the castle

In the 7th century the Umayyad Caliph Abd al-Malik, builder of the Dome of the Rock, constructed a fort called Minat al-Qal'a at Azotus Paralios in the 7th century as part of a series of coastal defenses in Palestine. The initial purpose was to hold off the strong Byzantine navy and it constituted one link in a chain of Muslim coastal fortifications. Measuring 35m by 55m, the fort was built over the razed insulae of the former Byzantine town, and was previously thought to be of later 10th or 11th century construction. It was only after subsequent archaeological work that it was determined to have been built by the Umayyads and only later remodelled by the Fatimids and Crusaders.

The medieval Arabic name of the port town was Mahuz Azdud, "harbour of Azdud", a combination of the already ancient Aramaic word for harbour, mahuz, and "Azdud", a return to a form much closer to the old Semitic name "Ashdod".

Documents from the Crusader period indicate that Ashdod and Ashdod-Yam belonged to the lordship of Ramla, and it appears probable that in 1169 the old Arab sea fort (Minat al-Qal'a) was given by Hugh, lord of Ramla, to his knight Nicolas de Beroard. From this period the fort is known as "Castellum Beroart".

=== Ayyubid and Mamluk periods ===
The port stops being mentioned during the Ayyubid and Mamluk periods, making it likely that it was destroyed by the Muslims along with the other port cities, due to fears that they might again be used by Crusader invasions from the sea. With the destruction of the port city, its inland counterpart regains its importance.

=== Ottoman and British Mandate period ===
During the Late Ottoman and British Mandate periods, the coastal sand dunes ariund Ashdod-Yam, known as Rimāl Isdūd, were cultivated using traditional Palestinian agricultural techniques adapted to sandy and shifting soils. Local farmers developed systems such as mawāsī (plot-and-berm cultivation), kurūm (vineyards), and basātīn (orchard gardens), which enabled sustainable farming in ecologically marginal landscapes. These methods combined local knowledge with environmental adaptation strategies like dune stabilization and the planting of drought-resistant crops. Contrary to colonial-era perceptions of the dunes as barren wastelands, recent studies have highlighted the productivity and ecological sophistication of these traditional land-use practices, contributing to a broader reevaluation of Palestinian agrarian history in the southern Levant.

== Excavation ==
The Iron Age site was excavated by Jacob Kaplan from 1965 to 1968 on behalf of the Tel Aviv-Yafo Museum of Antiquities. Finds at the site include sections of city fortification walls and a glacis. Pottery found at the site suggests that the fortifications were built in the second half of the 8th century BCE and that a second phase of occupation occurred during the 7th century BCE when the site was no longer fortified.

The medieval fort has been most recently worked on by Dov Nachlieli and his team.

== See also ==
- Ashdod, the historic twin city of Ashdod on the Sea; modern Ashdod now includes Ashdod on the Sea
- Minat al-Qal'a, the Early Muslim castle at Ashdod on the Sea
