= Culture of Egypt =

The culture of Egypt has thousands of years of recorded history. A cradle of civilization, Ancient Egypt was among the earliest civilizations in the world. For millennia, Egypt developed strikingly unique, complex and stable cultures that influenced other cultures of Europe, Africa and Asia.

== Languages ==
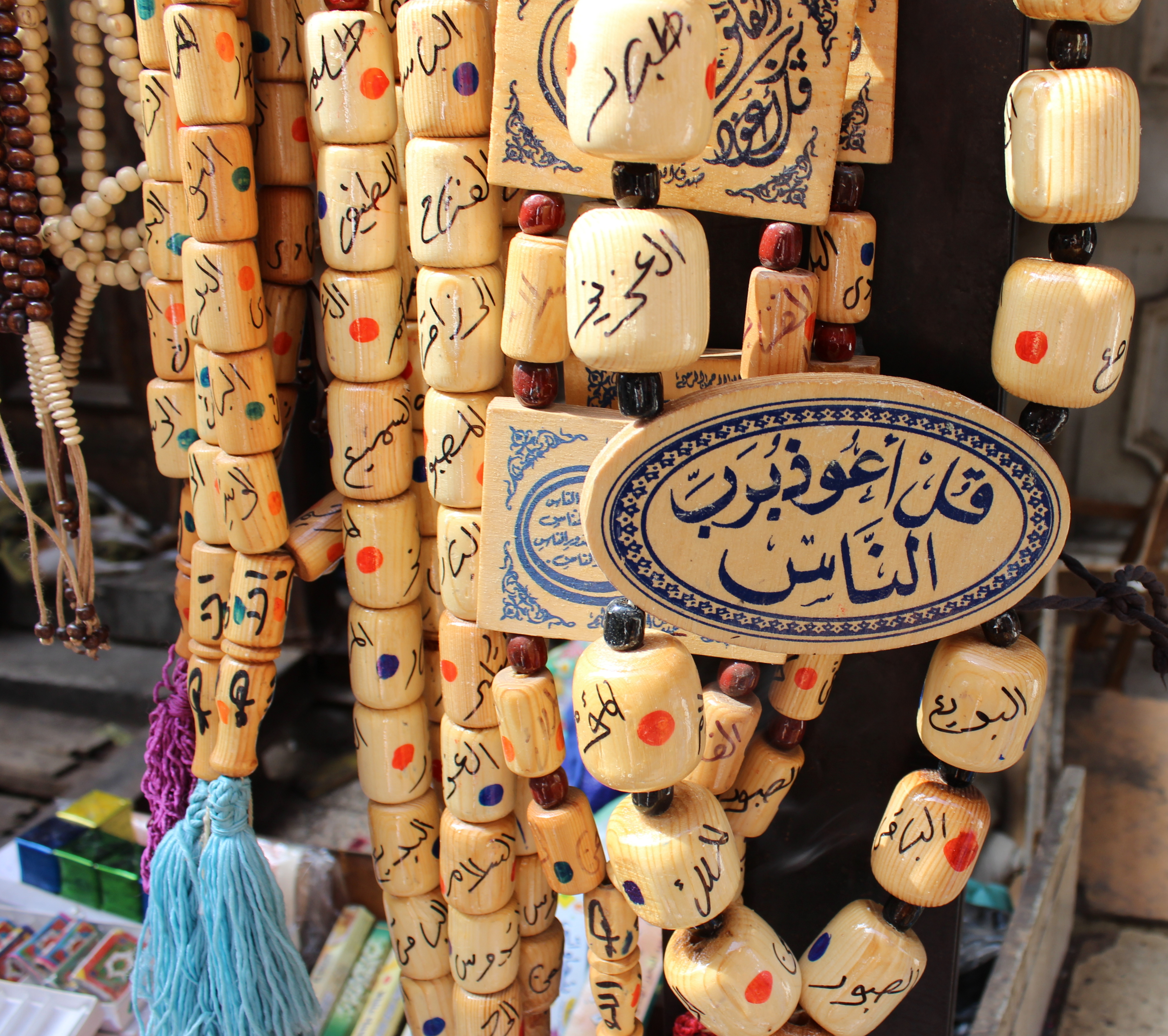
Arabic calligraphy has seen its golden age in Cairo. This adornment and beads being sold in Muizz Street

Arabic is currently Egypt's official language. It came to Egypt in the 7th century, and it is the formal and official language of the state which is used by the government and newspapers. Meanwhile, the Egyptian Arabic dialect or Masri is the official spoken language of the people. Of the many varieties of Arabic, the Egyptian dialect is the most widely spoken and the most understood, due to the great influence of Egyptian cinema and the Egyptian media throughout the Arabic-speaking world. Today many foreign students tend to learn it throughout Egyptian songs and movies, and the dialect is usually labelled by the general public as one of the easiest and fastest to learn, mainly due to the huge amount of accessible sources (movies, series, TV shows, books, etc.) that contribute to its learning process. Egypt's position in the heart of the Arabic speaking world has made it the centre of culture and its widespread dialect has had a huge influence on almost all neighbouring dialects, having so many Egyptian sayings in their daily lives.

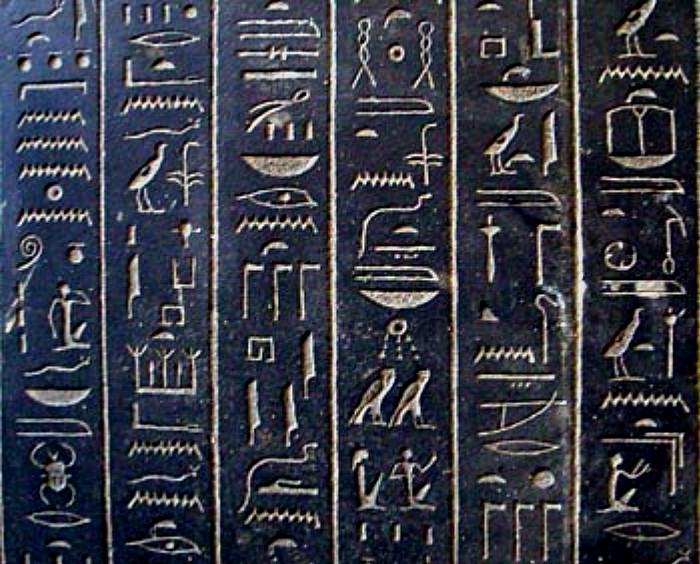
Hieroglyphs, as this example from a sarcophagus from Thebes of about 530 BC, represent both ideograms and phonograms.

The Egyptian language, which formed a separate branch among the family of Afro-Asiatic languages, was among the first written languages and is known from hieroglyph inscriptions preserved on monuments and sheets of papyrus. The Coptic language, the most recent stage of Egyptian written in mainly Greek alphabet with seven demotic letters, is today the liturgical language of the Coptic Orthodox Church.

The "Koiné" dialect of the Greek language was important in Hellenistic Alexandria, and was used in the philosophy and science of that culture, and was later studied by Arabic scholars.

In the upper Nile Valley, southern Egypt, around Kom Ombo and south of Aswan, there are about 300,000 speakers of Nubian languages; mainly Noubi, but also Kenuzi-Dongola. In Siwa Oasis, there is also the Siwi language that is spoken by about 20,000 speakers. Other minorities include roughly three thousand Greek speakers in Alexandria and Cairo as well as roughly 5,000 Armenian speakers.

== Literature ==
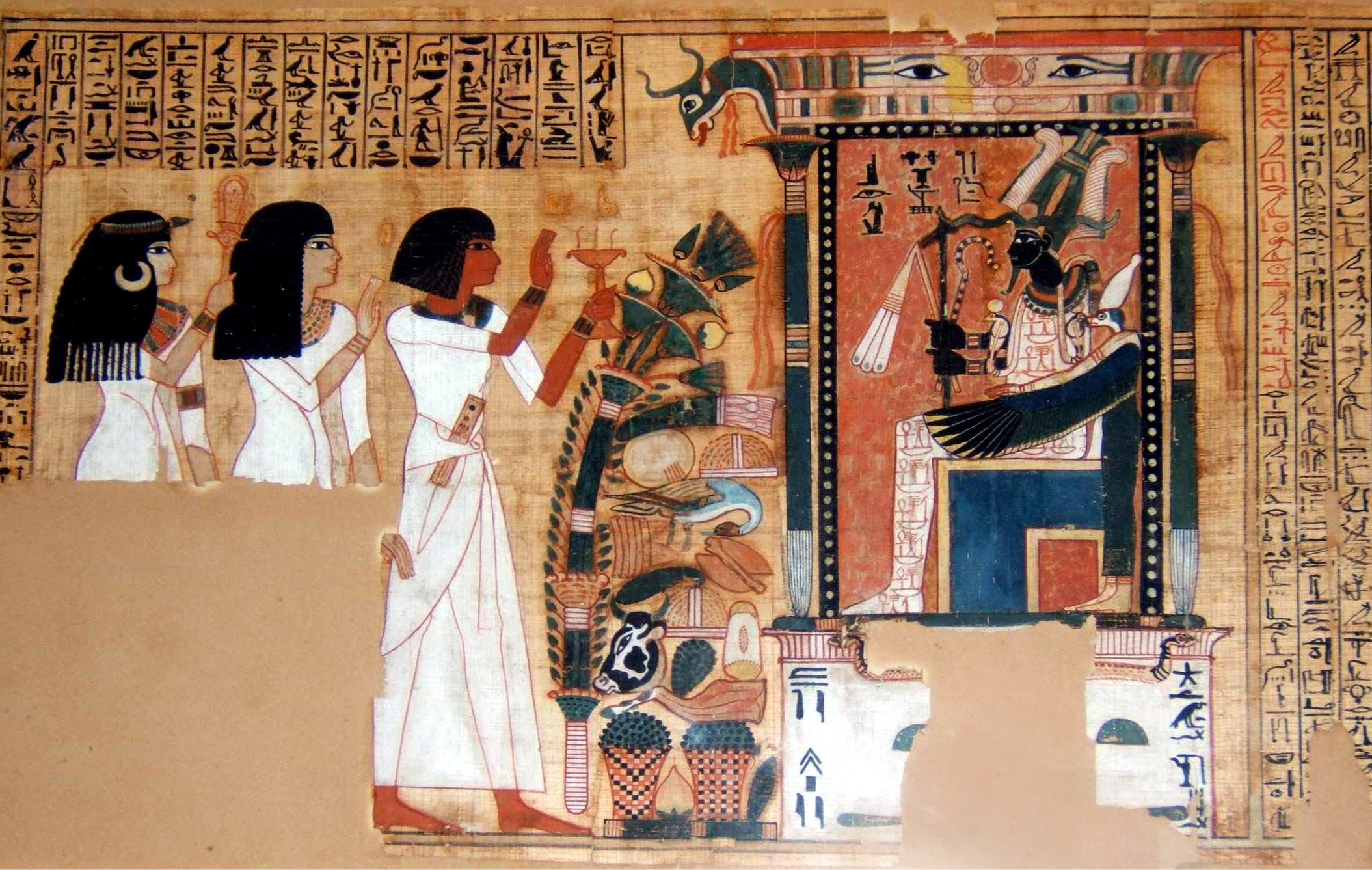
Sample of a Book of the Dead of the scribe Nebqed, c. 1300 BC.

Many Egyptians believed that when it came to a death of their Pharaoh, they would have to bury the Pharaoh deep inside the Pyramid. The ancient Egyptian literature dates back to the Old Kingdom, in the third millennium BC. Religious literature is best known for its hymns to and its mortuary texts. The oldest extant Egyptian literature is the Pyramid Texts: the mythology and rituals carved around the tombs of rulers. The later, secular literature of ancient Egypt includes the "wisdom texts", forms of philosophical instruction. The Instruction of Ptahhotep, for example, is a collation of moral proverbs by an Egto (the middle of the second millennium BC) seem to have been drawn from an elite administrative class, and were celebrated and revered into the New Kingdom (to the end of the second millennium). In time, the Pyramid Texts became Coffin Texts (perhaps after the end of the Old Kingdom), and finally, the mortuary literature produced its masterpiece, the Book of the Dead, during the New Kingdom.

The Middle Kingdom was the golden age of Egyptian literature. Some texts include the Tale of Neferty, the Instructions of Amenemhat I, the Tale of Sinuhe, the Story of the Shipwrecked Sailor and the Story of the Eloquent Peasant. Instructions became a popular literary genre of the New Kingdom, taking the form of advice on proper behavior. The Story of Wenamun and the Instruction of Any are examples from this period.

During the Greco-Roman period (332 BC − AD 639), Egyptian literature was translated into other languages, and Greco-Roman literature fused with native art into a new style of writing. From this period comes the Rosetta Stone, which became the key to unlocking the mysteries of Egyptian writing to modern scholarship. The city of Alexandria boasted its Library of almost half a million handwritten books during the third century BC. Alexandria's center of learning also produced the Greek translation of the Hebrew Bible, the Septuagint.

Akhenaten, Dweller in Truth, a 1985 novel by Nobel Literature Laureate Naguib Mahfouz.

During the first few centuries of the Christian era, Egypt was a source of a great deal of ascetic literature in the Coptic language. Egyptian monasteries translated many Greek and Syriac words, which are now only extant in Coptic. Under Islam, Egypt continued to be a great source of literary endeavor, now in the Arabic language. In 970, al-Azhar University was founded in Cairo, which to this day remains the most important center of Sunni Islamic learning. In 12th-century Egypt, the Jewish Talmudic scholar Maimonides produced his most important work.

In contemporary times, Egyptian novelists and poets were among the first to experiment with modern styles of Arabic-language literature, and the forms they developed have been widely imitated. The first modern Egyptian novel Zaynab by Muhammad Husayn Haykal was published in 1913 in the Egyptian vernacular. Egyptian novelist Naguib Mahfouz was the first Arabic-language writer to win the Nobel Prize in Literature. Many Egyptian books and films are available throughout the Middle East. Other Egyptian writers include Nawal El Saadawi, known for her feminist works and activism, and Alifa Rifaat who also wrote about women and tradition. Vernacular poetry is said to be the most popular literary genre amongst Egyptians, represented by Bayram el-Tunsi, Ahmed Fouad Negm (Fagumi), Salah Jaheen and Abdel Rahman el-Abnudi.

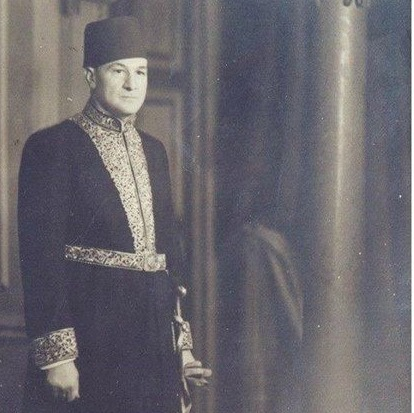
Aziz Pasha Abaza, poet from the aristocratic literary Egyptian family the House of Abaza of Circassian Abazin origin

An example of modern poetry in classical Arabic style with themes of Pan-Arabism is the work of Aziz Pasha Abaza. He came from Abaza family which produced notable Arabic literary figures including Ismail Pasha Abaza, Fekry Pasha Abaza, novelist Tharwat Abaza, and Desouky Bek Abaza, among others.

== Religion ==
About 85-95% percent of Egypt's population is Muslim, with a Sunni majority. About 5- 15% percent of the population is Coptic Christian; other religions and other forms of Christianity comprise the remaining three percent. Sunni Islam sees Egypt as an important part of its religion due to not only Quranic verses mentioning the country, but also due to the Al-Azhar University, one of the earliest of the world universities. It was created as a school for religion studies and works.

== Visual art ==
=== Egyptian art in antiquity ===
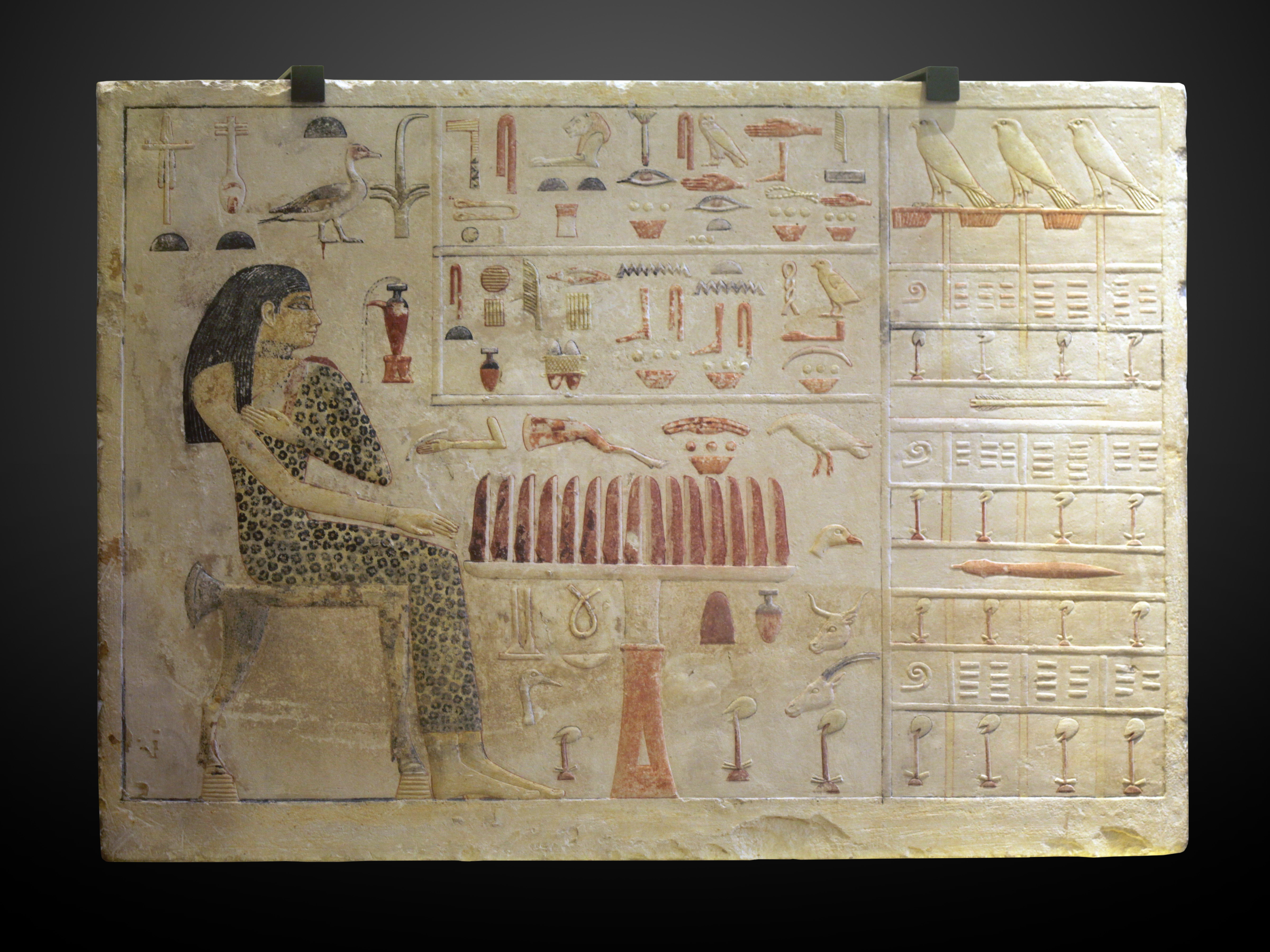
Stele of Princess Nefertiabet eating; 2589–2566 BC; limestone & paint; height: 37.7 cm (14 7/8 in.), length: 52.5 cm (20 5/8 in.), depth: 8.3 cm (3 1/4 in.); from Giza; Louvre (Paris). This finely executed relief represents the most succinct assurance of perpetual offering for the deceased

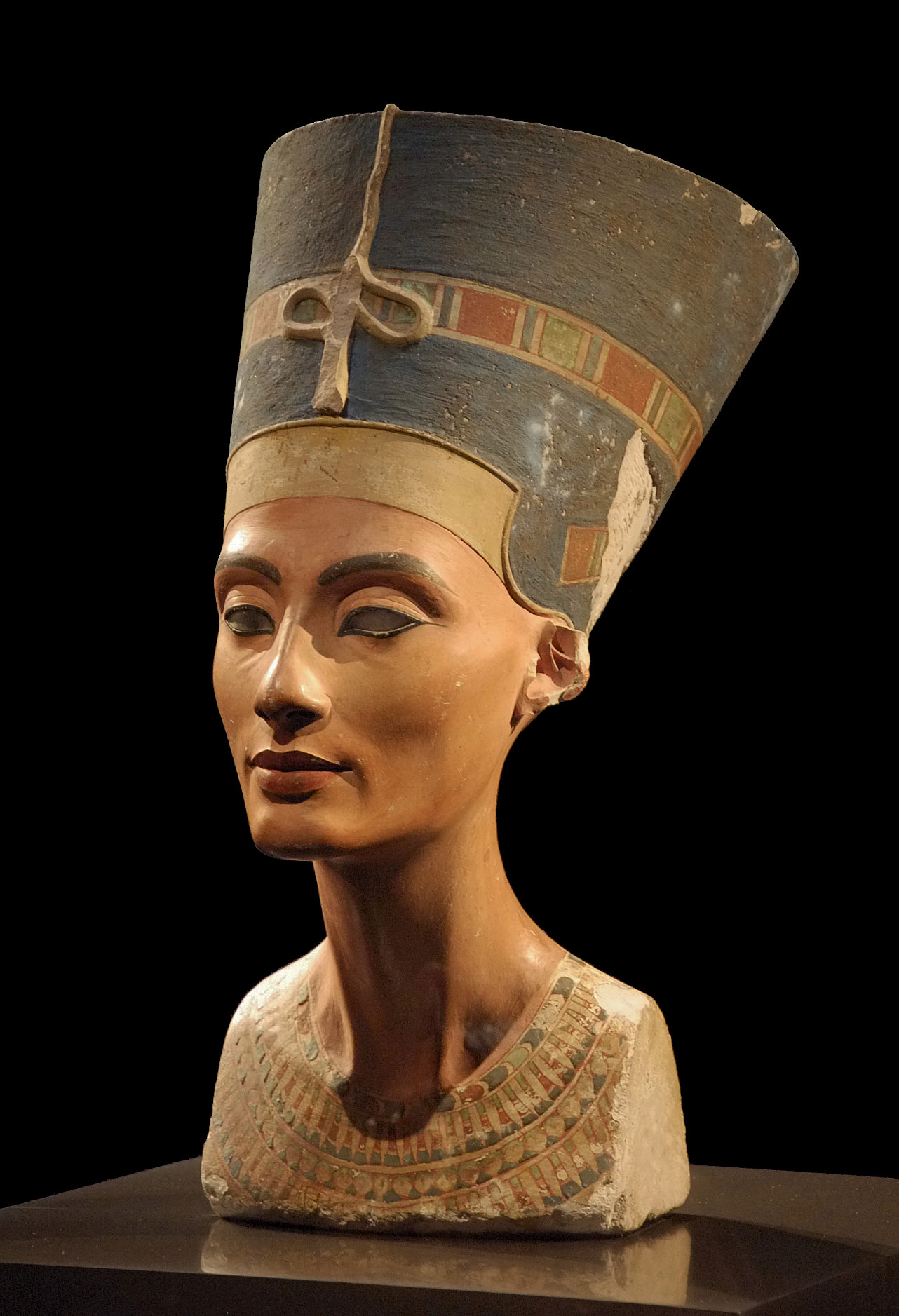
The Nefertiti Bust; 1352–1332 BC; painted limestone; height: 50 cm (1 ft. 7 in.); Neues Museum (Berlin, Germany)

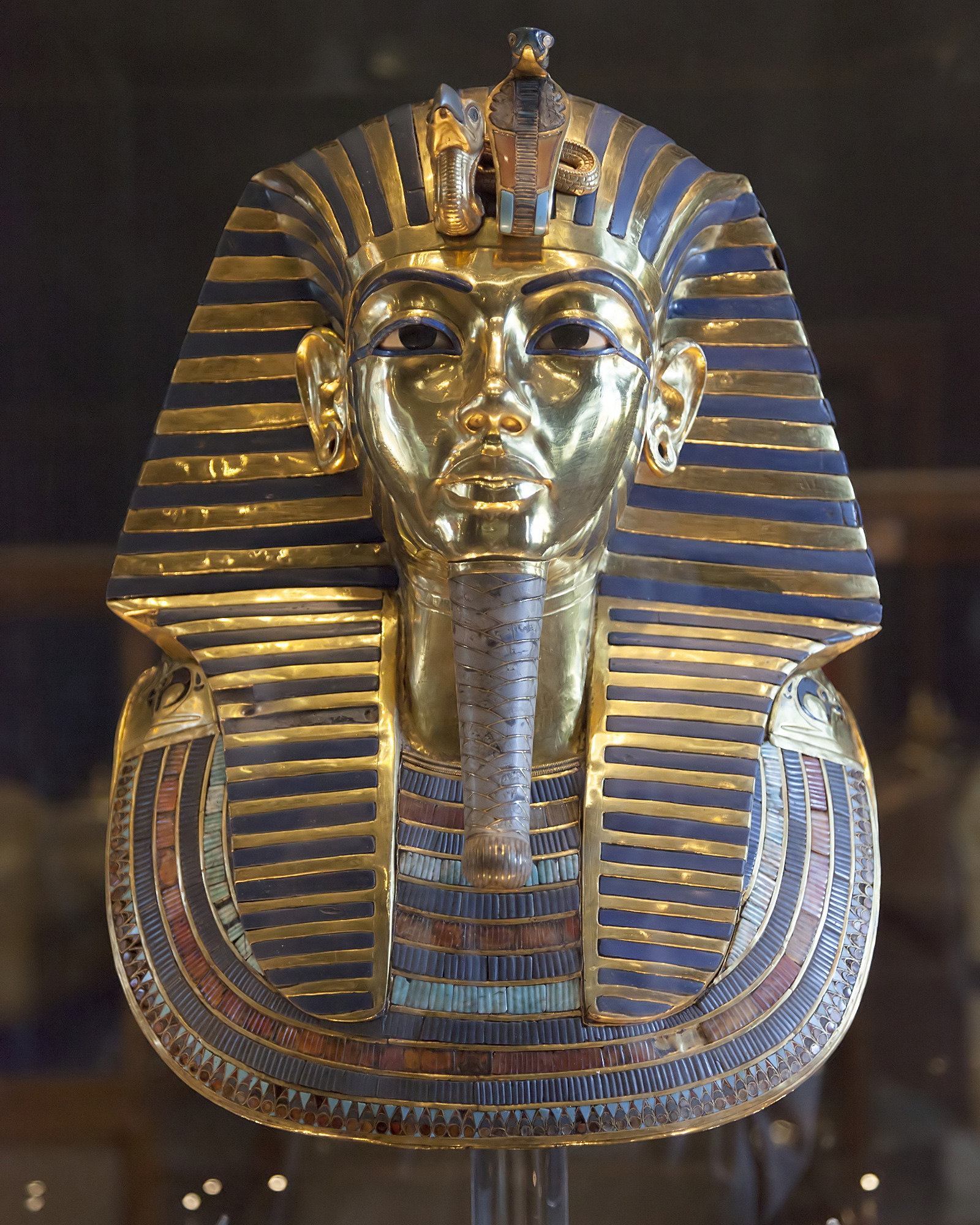
The Mask of Tutankhamun; c. 1327 BCE; gold, glass and semi-precious stones; height: 54 cm (21 1/4 in.); Egyptian Museum (Cairo)

The Egyptians were one of the first major civilizations to codify design elements in art. The wall painting done in the service of the Pharaohs followed a rigid code of visual rules and meanings. Early Egyptian art is characterized by the absence of linear perspective, which results in a seemingly flat space. These artists tended to create images based on what they knew, and not as much on what they saw. Objects in these artworks generally do not decrease in size as they increase in distance and there is little shading to indicate depth. Sometimes, distance is indicated through the use of tiered space, where more distant objects are drawn higher above the nearby objects, but in the same scale and with no overlapping of forms. People and objects are almost always drawn in profile.

Painting achieved its greats height in Dynasty XVIII during the reigns of Tuthmose IV and Amenhotep III. The Fragmentary panel of the Lady Thepu, on the right, dates from the time of the latter king.

Early Egyptian artists did have a system for maintaining dimensions within artwork. They used a grid system that allowed them to create a smaller version of the artwork, and then scale up the design based upon proportional representation in a larger grid.

=== Egyptian art in modern times ===
Modern and contemporary Egyptian art can be as diverse as any works in the world art scene. Some well-known names include Mahmoud Mokhtar, Abdel Hadi Al Gazzar, Farouk Hosny, Gazbia Sirry, Kamal Amin, Hussein El Gebaly, Sawsan Amer and many others. Many artists in Egypt have taken on modern media such as digital art and this has been the theme of many exhibitions in Cairo in recent times. There has also been a tendency to use the World Wide Web as an alternative outlet for artists and there is a strong Art-focused internet community on groups that have found origin in Egypt.

== Architecture ==
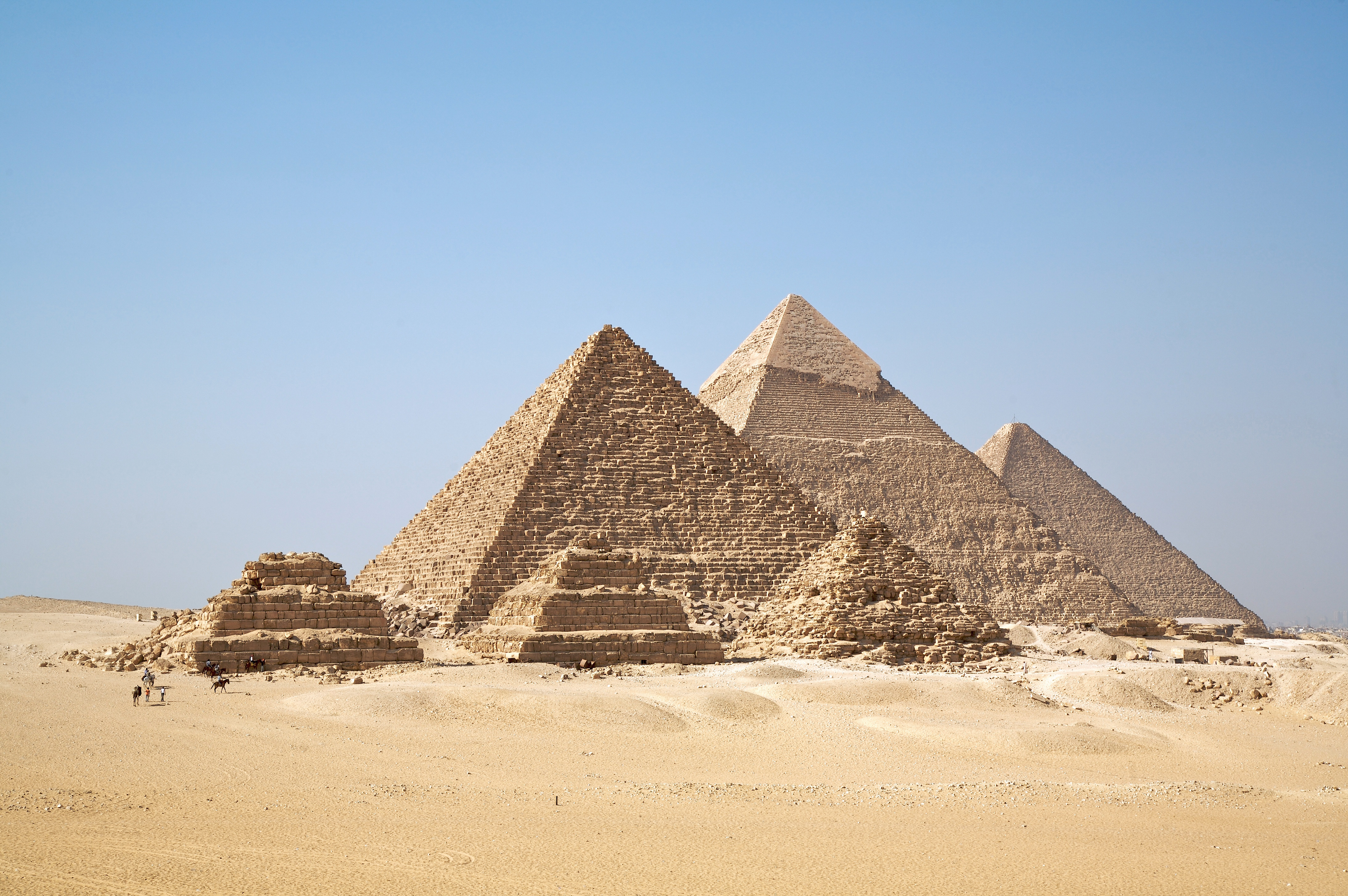
The Giza Pyramid complex (built sometime from 2600 and 2500 BC)

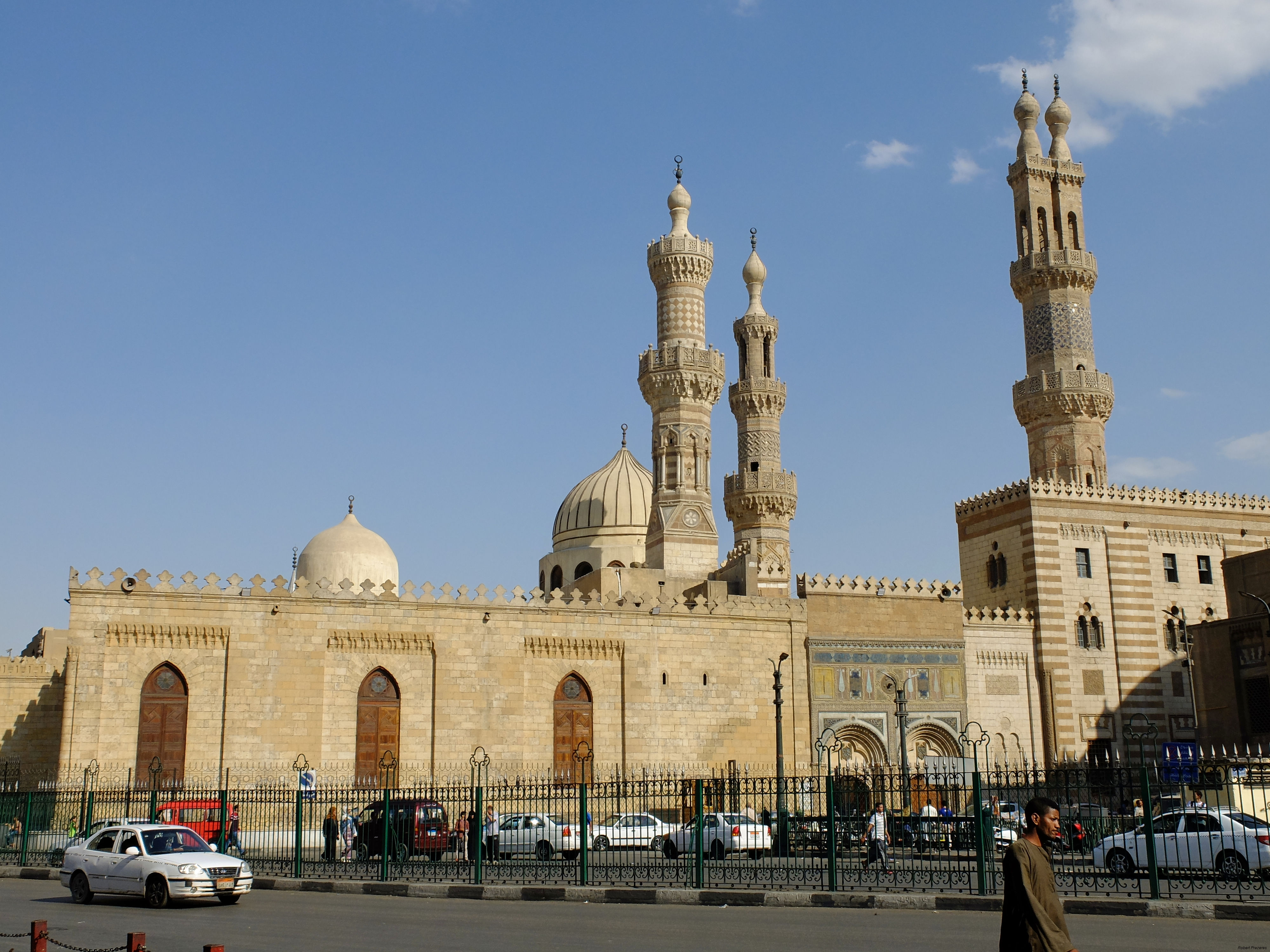
Al-Azhar Mosque in Cairo, a mix of Islamic architectural styles from the 10th to 19th centuries

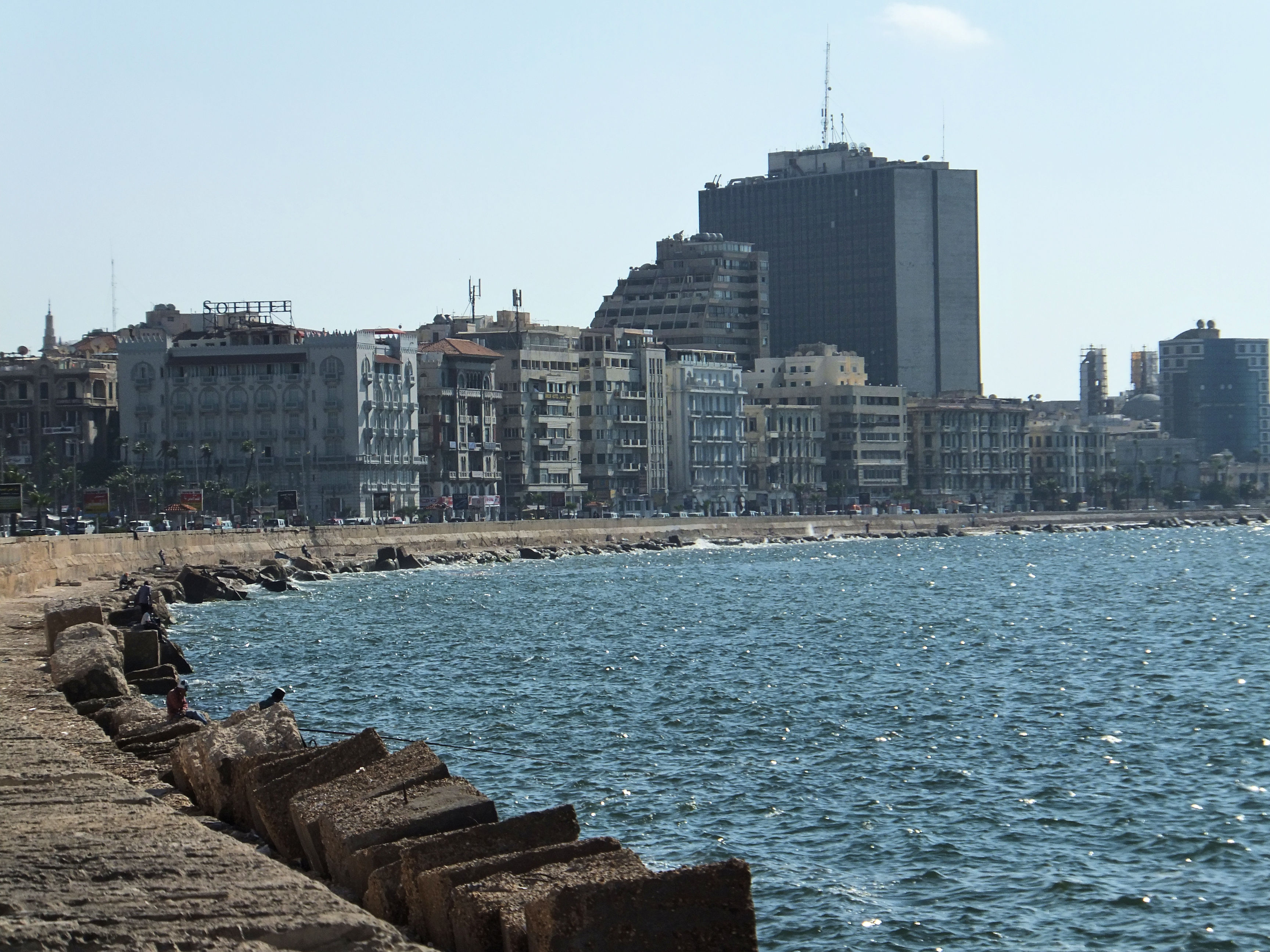
Cityscape in modern Alexandria

There have been many architectural styles used in Egyptian buildings over the centuries, including Ancient Egyptian architecture, Greco-Roman architecture, Islamic architecture, and modern architecture.

Ancient Egyptian architecture is best known for its monumental temples and tombs built in stone, including its famous pyramids, such as the pyramids of Giza. These were built with a distinctive repertoire of elements including pylon gateways, hypostyle halls, obelisks, and hieroglyphic decoration. The advent of Greek Ptolemaic rule, followed by Roman rule, introduced elements of Greco-Roman architecture into Egypt, especially in the capital city of Alexandria. After this came Coptic architecture, including early Christian architecture, which continued to follow ancient classical and Byzantine influences.

Following the Muslim conquest of Egypt in the 7th century, Islamic architecture flourished. A new capital, Fustat, was founded; it became the center of monumental architectural patronage thenceforth, and through successive new administrative capitals, it eventually became the modern city of Cairo. Early Islamic architecture displayed a mix of influences, including classical antiquity and new influences from the east such as the Abbasid style that radiated from the Abbasid Caliphate's heartland in Mesopotomia (present-day Iraq) during the 9th century. In the 10th century, Egypt became the center of a new empire, the Fatimid Caliphate. Fatimid architecture initiated further developments that influenced the architectural styles of subsequent periods. Saladin, who overthrew the Fatimids and founded the Ayyubid dynasty in the 12th century, was responsible for constructing the Cairo Citadel, which remained the center of government until the 19th century. During the Mamluk period (13th–16th centuries), a wealth of monumental religious and funerary complexes were built, constituting much of Cairo's medieval heritage today. The Mamluk architectural style continued to linger even after the Ottoman conquest of 1517, when Egypt became an Ottoman province.

In the early 19th century, Muhammad Ali began to modernize Egyptian society and encouraged a break with traditional medieval architectural traditions, initially by emulating late Ottoman architectural trends. Under the reign of his grandson Isma'il Pasha (1860s and 1870s), reform efforts were pushed further, the Suez Canal was constructed (inaugurated in 1869), and a new Haussmann-influenced expansion of Cairo began. European tastes became strongly evident in architecture in the late 19th century, though there was also a trend of reviving what were seen as indigenous or "national" architectural styles, such as the many Neo-Mamluk buildings of this era. In the 20th century, some Egyptian architects pushed back against dominant Western ideas of architecture. Among them, Hassan Fathy was known for adapting indigenous vernacular architecture to modern needs. Since then, Egypt continues to see new buildings erected in a variety of styles and for various purposes, ranging from housing projects to more monumental prestige projects like the Cairo Tower (1961) and the Bibliotheca Alexandrina (2002).

== Science ==
Egypt's cultural contributions have included great works of science, art, and mathematics, dating from antiquity to modern times.

=== Imhotep ===
Considered to be the first engineer, architect and physician in history known by name, Imhotep designed the Pyramid of Djoser (the Step Pyramid) at Saqqara in Egypt around 2630–2611 BC, and may have been responsible for the first known use of columns in architecture. The Egyptian historian Manetho credited him with inventing stone-dressed building during Djoser's reign, though he was not the first to actually build with stone. Imhotep is also believed to have founded Egyptian medicine, being the author of the world's earliest known medical document, the Edwin Smith Papyrus.

=== Ptolemaic and Roman Egypt ===
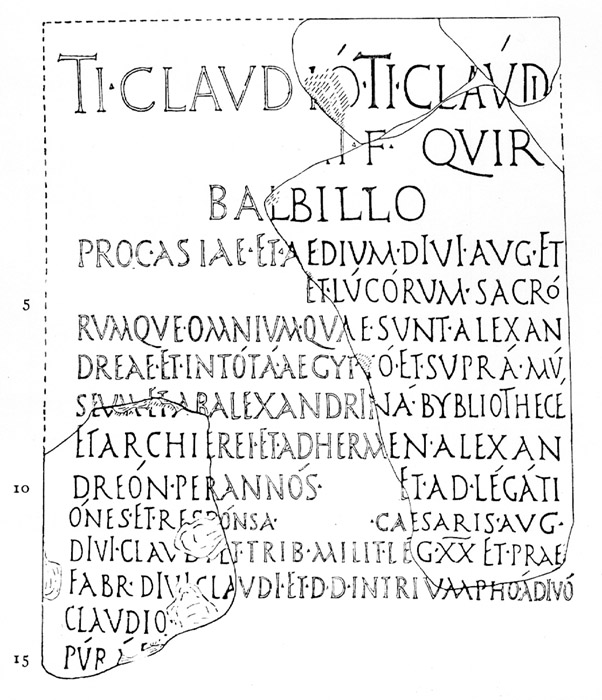
Inscription referring to the Alexandrian library, dated AD 56

The silk road led straight through ancient Alexandria. Also, the Royal Library of Alexandria was once the largest in the world. It is usually assumed to have been founded at the beginning of the 3rd century BC during the reign of Ptolemy II of Egypt after his father had set up the Temple of the Muses or Museum. The initial organization is attributed to Demetrius Phalereus. The Library is estimated to have stored at its peak 400,000 to 700,000 scrolls.

One of the reasons so little is known about the Library is that it was lost centuries after its creation. All that is left of many of the volumes are tantalizing titles that hint at all the history lost due to the building's destruction. Few events in ancient history are as controversial as the destruction of the Library, as the historical record is both contradictory and incomplete. Its destruction has been attributed by some authors to, among others, Julius Caesar, Augustus, and Catholic zealots during the purge of the Arian heresy, Not surprisingly, the Great Library became a symbol of knowledge itself, and its destruction was attributed to those who were portrayed as ignorant barbarians, often for purely political reasons.

A new library was inaugurated in 2003 near the site of the old library.

The Lighthouse of Alexandria, one of the Seven Wonders of the Ancient World, designed by Sostratus of Cnidus and built during the reign of Ptolemy I Soter served as the city's landmark, and later, lighthouse.

==== Mathematics and technology ====
Alexandria, being the center of the Hellenistic world, produced a number of great mathematicians, astronomers, and scientists such as Ctesibius, Pappus, and Diophantus. It also attracted scholars from all over the Mediterranean such as Eratosthenes of Cyrene.

==== Ptolemy ====
Ptolemy is one of the most famous astronomers and geographers from Egypt, famous for his work in Alexandria. Born Claudius Ptolemaeus (Greek: Κλαύδιος Πτολεμαίος; c. 85 – c. 165), he was a geographer, astronomer, and astrologer.

Ptolemy was the author of two important scientific treatises. One is the astronomical treatise that is now known as the Almagest (in Greek Η μεγάλη Σύνταξις, "The Great Treatise"). In this work, one of the most influential books of antiquity, Ptolemy compiled the astronomical knowledge of the ancient Greek and Babylonian world. Ptolemy's other main work is his Geography. This too is a compilation, of what was known about the world's geography in the Roman Empire in his time.

In his Optics, a work which survives only in an Arabic translation, he writes about properties of light, including reflection, refraction and colour. His other works include Planetary Hypothesis, Planisphaerium and Analemma. Ptolemy's treatise on astrology, the Tetrabiblos, was the most popular astrological work of antiquity and also enjoyed great influence in the Islamic world and the medieval Latin West.

Ptolemy also wrote influential work Harmonics on music theory. After criticizing the approaches of his predecessors, Ptolemy argued for basing musical intervals on mathematical ratios (in contrast to the followers of Aristoxenus) backed up by empirical observation (in contrast to the over-theoretical approach of the Pythagoreans). He presented his own divisions of the tetrachord and the octave, which he derived with the help of a monochord. Ptolemy's astronomical interests appeared in a discussion of the music of the spheres.

Tributes to Ptolemy include Ptolemaeus crater on the Moon and Ptolemaeus crater on Mars.

=== Modern Egypt ===
==== Ahmed Zewail ====
Ahmed Zewail (Arabic: أحمد زويل) (born February 26, 1946) is an Egyptian chemist, and the winner of the 1999 Nobel Prize in Chemistry for his work on femtochemistry. Born in Damanhur (60 km south-east of Alexandria) and raised in Disuq, he moved to the United States to complete his PhD at the University of Pennsylvania. He was awarded a faculty appointment at Caltech in 1976, where he has remained since.

Zewail's key work has been as the pioneer of femtochemistry. He developed a method using a rapid laser technique (consisting of ultrashort laser flashes), which allows the description of reactions at the atomic level. It can be viewed as a highly sophisticated form of flash photography

In 1999, Zewail became the third Egyptian to receive the Nobel Prize, following Anwar Sadat (1978 in Peace) and Naguib Mahfouz (1988 in Literature). In 1999, he received Egypt's highest state honor, the Grand Collar of the Nile.

==== Egyptology ====
In modern times, archaeology and the study of Egypt's ancient heritage as the field of Egyptology has become a major scientific pursuit in the country itself. The field began during the Middle Ages, and has been led by Europeans and Westerners in modern times. The study of Egyptology, however, has in recent decades been taken up by Egyptian archæologists such as Zahi Hawass and the Supreme Council of Antiquities he leads.

The discovery of the Rosetta Stone, a tablet written in ancient Greek, Egyptian Demotic script, and Egyptian hieroglyphs, has partially been credited for the recent stir in the study of Ancient Egypt. Greek, a well-known language, gave linguists the ability to decipher the mysterious Egyptian hieroglyphic language. The ability to decipher hieroglyphics facilitated the translation of hundreds of the texts and inscriptions that were previously indecipherable, giving insight into Egyptian culture that would have otherwise been lost to the ages. The stone was discovered on July 15, 1799, in the port town of Rosetta, Egypt, and has been held in the British Museum since 1802.

== Sport ==
Football is the most popular sport in Egypt. Egyptian football clubs, especially Zamalek and Al Ahly are known throughout Africa. The Egyptian national football team won the African Cup of Nations a record 7 times (in 1957, 1959, 1986, 1998, 2006 (on home soil), 2008 and 2010). Egypt was the first African country to join FIFA, but it has only made it to the FIFA World Cup four times times, in 1934, 1990, 2018 and 2026. Egypt also won the World Military Cup five times and finished as runners-up twice.

Other popular sports in Egypt are basketball, handball, squash, and tennis.

The Egyptian national basketball team holds the record for best performance at the Basketball World Cup and at the Summer Olympics in Middle East and Africa. Egypt hosted the 2017 FIBA Under-19 Basketball World Cup and is the only African country to host an official basketball world cup at junior or senior level. Further, the country hosted the official African Basketball Championship on six occasions. Egypt also hosted multiple continental youth championships including the 2020 FIBA Africa Under-18 Championship and the 2020 FIBA Africa Under-18 Championship for Women. The Pharaohs, as they are commonly known, won 16 medals at the African Championship.

Since the early 1990s, the Egyptian national handball team has won regional and continental tournaments as well as reaching fourth place internationally in 2001. The Junior national handball team won the world title in 1993 and it hosted the tournament in 2010.

Local sports clubs receive financial support from the local governments, and many sporting clubs are financially and administratively supported by the government.

== Media ==
=== Cinema ===
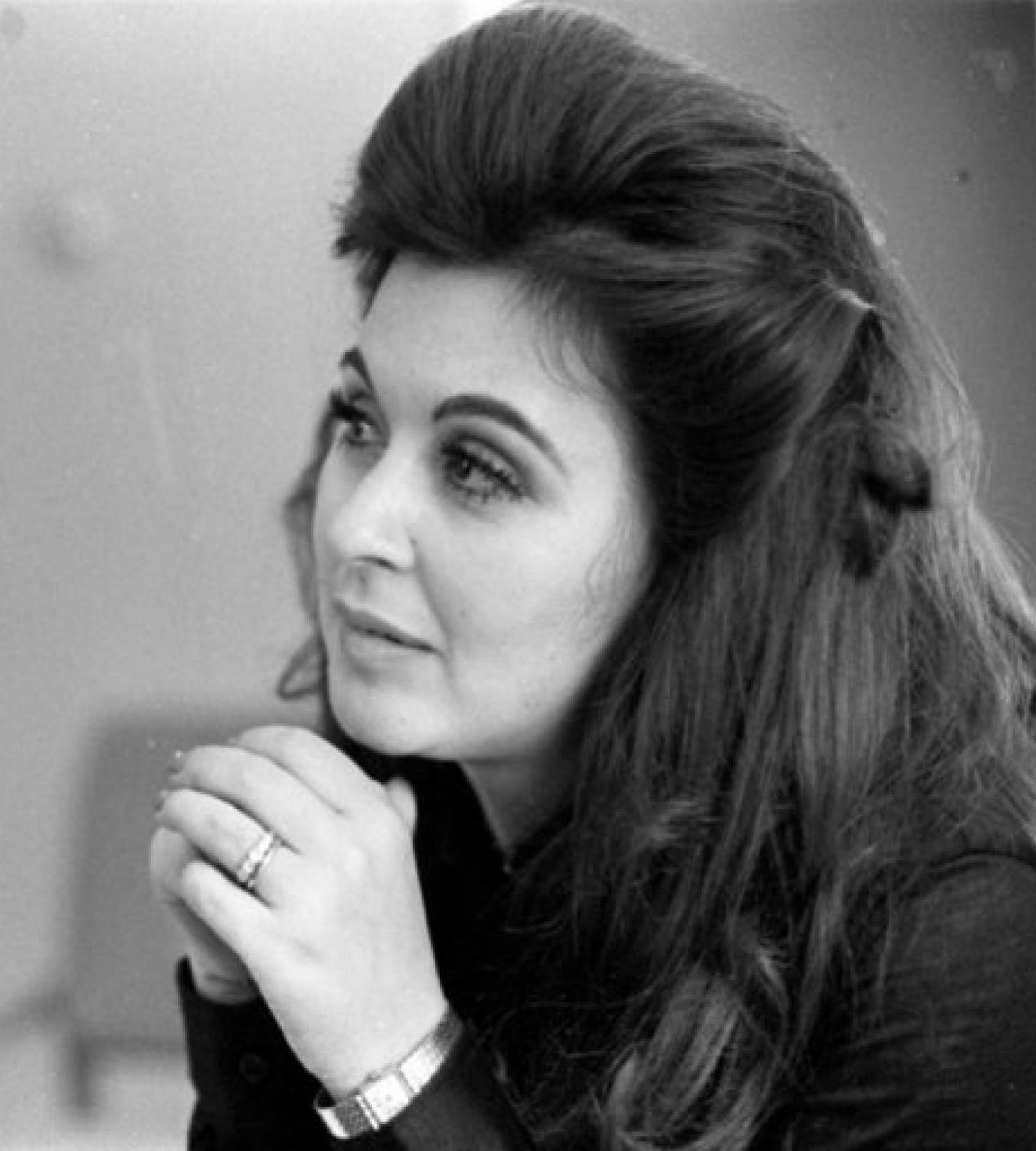
Soad Hosny, Egyptian film star. Among the most famous Egyptian and Arabic actresses.

In 1940, Egyptian cinema has flourished since the 1930s. As a result, the Egyptian capital has been dubbed the "Hollywood of the Middle East", where the world-renowned Cairo International Film Festival is held every year. The festival has been rated by the International Federation of Film Producers Associations as being among the 11 top-class film festivals worldwide.

The Egyptian film industry is the largest & most developed within Arabic-speaking cinema.

== Music and dance ==
External videos
- Turkish-Egyptian Dance Troupe Al Rakasaat's "Alexandria" Choreographed by Karen Custer Thurston

Egyptian music is a rich mixture of indigenous Egyptian and Western influences.

As early as 4000 BC, ancient Egyptians were playing harps and flutes, as well as two indigenous instruments: the ney and the oud. However, there is a little notation of Egyptian music before the 7th century AD, when Egypt became part of the Muslim world. Percussion and vocal music became important at this time and has remained an important part of Egyptian music today.

Contemporary Egyptian music traces its beginnings to the creative work of Abdu-l Hamuli, Almaz, Sayed Mikkawi, and Mahmud Osman, who were all patronized by Khedive Ismail and who influenced the later work of Sayed Darwish, Umm Kulthum, Mohammed Abdel Wahab, Abdel Halim Hafez and other Egyptian musicians.

From the 1970s onwards, Egyptian pop music has become increasingly important in Egyptian culture, particularly among the large youth population of Egypt. Egyptian folk music is also popular, played during weddings and other festivities. In the last quarter of the 20th century, Egyptian music was a way to communicate social and class issues. The most popular Egyptian pop singers are Amr Diab, Tamer Hosny, Mohamed Mounir, Angham and Ali El Haggar. Electronic music composers, Halim El-Dabh, is an Egyptian.

Belly dance, or Raqs Sharqi (literally: oriental dancing) may have originated in Egypt.

The Arabic musical discipline known as "maqam," or chanting has both secular and religious uses. Maqams are almost always sung by men in the region, where women who perform music or sing publicly are often viewed as promiscuous. The members of Alhour, Egypt's first all-female Muslim recitation choir, are challenging deep-rooted taboos about women singing in public or reciting from the Quran in the socially conservative country. Alhour choir was launched in 2017.

== Clothing ==
The hijab became more unpopular with educated women, including devout Muslims, in the early 20th century as the British authorities discouraged it and as women sought to gain modern positions of power. The hijab became more popular in the 1970s, with women choosing to adopt it due to the surge of pan-Arabism (especially its islamically rooted side) and Wahabbism as a result of the returning Egyptian migrants from Gulf Arab countries who got influenced by their beliefs & cultural set during their stay there.

In 2012, Misr International Films was producing a television series based on the novel Zaat by Sonallah Ibrahim. Filming of scenes set at Ain Shams University was scheduled to occur that year. However, Muslim Brotherhood student members and some teachers at the school protested, stating that the 1970s era clothing worn by the actresses was indecent and would not allow filming unless the clothing was changed. Gaby Khoury, the head of the film company, stated that the engineering department head, Sherif Hammad, "insisted that the filming should stop and that we would be reimbursed ... explaining that he was not able to guarantee the protection of the materials or the artists."

== Cuisine ==
Egyptian cuisine consists of local culinary traditions such as Ful medames, Falafel, Kushari, and Molokhia. It also shares similarities with food found throughout the eastern Mediterranean like Kebab and Shawarma.

== See also ==
- Arab culture
- Bibliotheca Alexandrina
- Center for Documentation of Cultural and Natural Heritage
- Egyptian television
- List of museums in Egypt
- North Sinai Archaeological Sites Zone
- Shaware3na
- Middle Eastern cuisine
- Tables of Mercy
