= Tell el-Borg =

Coordinates: 30.9230°N 32.4147°E

Tell el-Borg was an ancient military settlement in north Sinai, in the Ismailia Governorate of Egypt. It was situated on the ancient military road called the Way of Horus, which was part of a vital frontier defence network guarding Egypt's eastern border. Its original ancient name was The Dwelling of the Lion. Later under Ramses II, it was renamed as Dwelling of Ramesses, beloved of Amun.

The archaeological site was first excavated between 1998 and 2008 by a team led by James K. Hoffmeier as part of a salvage archaeology project.

== Location ==
Tell el-Borg is located almost directly east of the major Egyptian fort at Tell Heboua, identified as ancient Tjaru, which was the central point of the frontier defence network in the area. The distance from the site of Tell Heboua II is about 5km.

The site comprises four main zones. One of them was a military sector with an early fortress that was later reconstructed. There was also an area of public space, a domestic area, and cemeteries.

== Excavations ==
Excavations uncovered two successive New Kingdom fortresses at the site. The earlier fort was built during the 18th Dynasty around the reign of Amenhotep II. It later suffered water damage and was abandoned towards the end of the 18th Dynasty. The water streams in the area continuously changed their course.

A square Ramesside fortress was built here later. It measured about 70 × 80 meters, and was eventually destroyed by fire towards the end of the 20th Dynasty of Egypt. The destruction is linked to attacks by the Sea Peoples around that time.

== Migdol (T-211) ==
Migdol is a frontier fortress in Egypt that was located in the eastern Nile Delta. It was an important military stronghold that guarded Egypt's eastern border.

Migdol fortress (“Migdol of Men-maʿat-re”) was first mentioned on a wall of Karnak Temple in the reign of king Seti I. It was part of his list of geographical locations in the eastern Nile Delta. It was also mentioned many times in the Bible in different contexts. But scholars have been debating for a long time about where this place was situated. In recent years, it was suggested that its location was to the east of Tell el-Borg, at a site known as T-211. This location was first surveyed by E. Oren in the early 1980s.

According to James Hoffmeier (2018),

"T-211 is an ideal location for the Migdol fort that bore the names of Seti I and Ramesses II and III. It is the next New Kingdom site following the Dwelling of the Lion/Ramesses (i.e., Tell el-Borg), and only about 4 km separates them. ... The T-211 fort stands strategically on the military highway leading to Egypt and guards the southern end of the lagoon; it seems now to be the best candidate for the Migdol fort of Seti I and Ramesses II and III. Any hostile force coming overland from the Levant to invade Egypt would have to pass by the massive fort at T-211."

In his study, Hoffmeier has done a detailed topographic analysis of the area in question. He argues that these three neighbouring forts, Heboua, Tell el-Borg, and Migdol (T-211) were all located on a low ridge where the ancient road known as Way of Horus went through. This road provided the vital link between Egypt and the Levant. The low areas around this ridge were criss-crossed with water streams and lagoons, and would have been partly flooded during the annual Nile inundations.

== See also ==
- Nile Delta
- North Sinai Archaeological Sites Zone

== Bibliography ==
- Duff, Catherine. 2014. “Levantine-Egyptian Interconnections at Tell el-Borg, North Sinai”. In Excavations in North Sinai: Tell el-Borg I, edited by James K. Hoffmeier, 436–481. Winona Lake, IN: Eisenbrauns.
- Hummel, R., Report on the Ceramics Recovered from Tell El-Borg, in: Hoffmeier, J. K. (ed.), Excavations in North Sinai: Tell el-Borg I, Winona Lake 2014, 364–435.
- Hoffmeier, J.K. and El-Maksoud, M.A. 2003 “A new military site on the ‘Ways of Horus’ – Tell el-Borg 1999–2001: a preliminary report,” Journal of Egyptian Archaeology, volume 89: 169–97, pls.x–xiii.
- Hoffmeier, J. K. et al., The Ramesside Period Fort, in: Hoffmeier, J. K. (ed.), Excavations in North Sinai: Tell el-Borg I, Winona Lake 2014, 207–345.
- Hoffmeier, J. K. and L. Bertini, 2019 Tell el-Borg II: Excavations in North Sinai, University Park, Pennsylvania.
- Hoffmeier, J. K. and K. A. Kitchen, 2014 Tell el-Borg I: The “Dwelling of the Lion” on the Ways of Horus, Winona Lake, Indiana.
- Hoffmeier, J. K. and S. O. Moshier, 2014 “The Ways of Horus”: Reconstructing Egypt's East Frontier Defense Network and the Military Road to Canaan in New Kingdom Egypt, 34–60 in: J. K. Hoffmeier (ed.), Tell el-Borg I, Winona Lake, Indiana.
- Hussein, H. M., 2019 Mapping an Ancient Egyptian Highway of North Sinai: The Ways of Horus, 348–354 in: J. K. Hoffmeier and L. Bertini (ed.), Tell el-Borg II: excavations in North Sinai, University Park, Pennsylvania.
- Moshier, S., Gayed, B., 2019 Geological investigation of the Balah depression, northern Suez Canal zone, Egypt. In: Hoffmeier, James K., Excavations in north Sinai. Tell el-Borg II, University Park Pennsylvania, 5–20.
- Mumford, Gregory, 2014. “Tell el-Borg Pottery Volumes”. In Excavations in North Sinai: Tell elBorg I, edited by James K. Hoffmeier, 502–505. Winona Lake, IN: Eisenbrauns.
