= Marwa Jawhar =

Egyptian writer and novelist

- Born: Egypt
- Education: Film directing
- Occupation: Author
- Writing career
- Language: Arabic
- Genre: Horror fiction

Marwa Jawhar is an Egyptian writer and novelist. She first worked as a flight attendant and then became a writer. Marwa studied film directing in the Egyptian castle in Cairo and participated in a lot of short fiction and documentary films. She wrote pieces in Al-Ain magazine and Al-Dastour newspaper and she still writes regularly on online websites.

== About the writer ==
Marwa Jawhar's first ever book was "Cut to the chase" published in 2013 where she took all that she wrote in Al-Ain magazine and Al-Dastour newspaper and gathered it in a book that talks about the psychological and emotional aspects of the Egyptian culture and the economic problems that may face the Egyptian resident in a light and fun way. She specializes in horror literature, where most of her books are about strange and horror plots. She also had a book under the name "The flight attendant 13" published in 2015, and "Happens at night in the closed room" which is her first ever novel to be produced as a cinematic work. Currently, she published her novel "talisman house". She often writes based on true stories horror literature from events that happened to her personally.

== The author's books ==
- "Cut to the chase" published in 2013
- "The flight attendant 13" published in 2015
- "Happens at night in the closed room" published in 2018
- "talisman house" published in 2019
- "The black sleep" published in 2020
- "The building of Al-Daod" published in 2021
