= KÁ =

Cuneiform sign

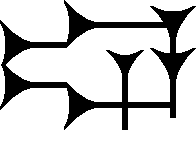
Cuneiform sign for KÁ, "gate".

The cuneiform sign KÁ, for gate is the Sumerogram-(logogram) used in the Amarna letters and the Epic of Gilgamesh; as just KÁ it means "gate" or "doorway", Akkadian language, "bābu"; as "Gate-Great", KÁ.GAL for City-Gate, it is from Akkadian "abullu", ("(city) gate"). Both uses are in the Epic of Gilgamesh. In the Epic, it is only used as the sumerogram, a total of 19 times, (7 times for 'abullu', city gate). In the Epic, all spellings for city gate use KÁ.GAL; for gate ('bābu') only one spelling uses the alphabetic letters for b-a-b-u; the rest use KÁ along with other added cuneiform signs (KÁ-x-x, or KÁ-x, etc.).

Similar usage of KÁ for gates is also attested in administrative texts from the Old Babylonian period, showing its continuity in Mesopotamian writing.

== Amarna letters ==
In the Amarna letters, the topic of Amarna letter EA 296, Under the Yoke, is the guarding of two cities, at the city gate; also the man authoring the letter, Yabitiri-(Yahtiru)-(governor?) of City? is called a "gatekeeper", lines 24 and 31: LÚ.PA.KÁ.ŠU, Man-Gate-"hand". Šu (cuneiform), (shaped like a 'hand'), has the secondary meaning besides šu, for Akkadian language qat, for "qātu", 'hand' (as ŠU, a sumerogram), and used for 9 of about 15 spellings of 'qātu' in the Epic of Gilgamesh.

In letter EA 296, the text is as follows: (reverse side of letter)

"...inquire of his commissioner whether I guard the city gate of Azzatu, and the city gate of Yapu, ...."

The city gate is also discussed in the Amarna letter from Tjaru.

== See also ==
- Yabitiri
- Tjaru
