= James K. Hoffmeier =

American Old Testament scholar and Egyptologist (born 1951)

- Born: February 13, 1951 (age 75); Kingdom of Egypt
- Title: Professor of Old Testament and Ancient Near Eastern History and Archaeology

Academic background
- Education: University of Toronto (M.A., Ph.D.)
- Alma mater: Wheaton College (B.A.)
- Thesis: "Sacred" in the Vocabulary of Ancient Egypt (1982)
- Doctoral advisor: Ronald J. Williams

Academic work
- Discipline: Biblical studies; Near Eastern archaeology
- Sub-discipline: Old Testament studies; Egyptology
- Institutions: Trinity Evangelical Divinity School
- Main interests: Biblical archaeology; Historicity of the Bible; History of ancient Israel and Judah

James K. Hoffmeier (born February 13, 1951) is an Egyptian-born American Old Testament scholar, archaeologist, and Egyptologist, specializing in biblical archaeology, Near Eastern archaeology, and historicity of the Hebrew Bible. He served as Professor of Old Testament and Ancient Near Eastern History and Archaeology at Trinity Evangelical Divinity School.

== Education and career ==
Hoffmeier graduated with a B.A. at Wheaton College, followed by a M.A. and Ph.D. at the University of Toronto.

During the period from 1975 to 1977, Hoffmeier worked on the Akhenaten Temple Project based in Luxor, Egypt. He has been the Professor of Archaeology and Old Testament at Wheaton College. He was director of excavations at Tell el-Borg, Sinai Peninsula from 1998 to 2008. Additionally he is often called upon as a consultant for television programs made for the History, Discovery, Learning, and National Geographic Channels.

Hoffmeier has written articles published in academic journals specialized in the field of Egyptology, including the Journal of the American Research Center in Egypt, Journal of Egyptian Archaeology, Revue d'Égyptologie, and Ägypten und Levante. He served as a contributor for the Oxford Encyclopedia of Ancient Egypt, the Anchor Bible Dictionary, and the New International Dictionary of Old Testament Theology & Exegesis. He served as an archaeological editor for the English Standard Version Study Bible and has authored several books on biblical archaeology. Hoffmeier is a biblical maximalist and has often published works which defend the historicity of the Hebrew Bible.

== Works ==
=== Books ===
- Hoffmeier, James K.; Williams, Ronald J.; Meltzer, E. S., eds. (1983). Egyptological Miscellanies: a tribute to Professor Ronald J. Williams. Ancient World. Vol. 6. Chicago, IL: Ares. OCLC 64103388.
- ——— (1985). Sacred in the Vocabulary of Ancient Egypt: the term DSR, with special reference to dynasties I-XX. Orbis biblicus et orientalis. Vol. 59. Freiburg, Switzerland; Göttingen: Universitätsverlag; Vandenhoeck & Ruprecht. ISBN 978-3-7278-0324-6. OCLC 12171356.
- ———, ed. (1987). Abortion: a Christian understanding and response. Grand Rapids, MI: Baker Book House. ISBN 978-0-801-04317-8. OCLC 16661376.
- ———; Douglas, J. D., eds. (1991). New Commentary on the Whole Bible: based on the classic commentary of Jamieson, Fausset, and Brown (Old Testament volume) (Revised and reworked ed.). Wheaton, IL: Tyndale House Publishers. ISBN 978-0-842-34739-6. OCLC 22956578.
- ———; Millard, A. R.; Baker, David W., eds. (1994). Faith, tradition, and history : Old Testament historiography in its Near Eastern context. Winona Lake, IN: Eisenbrauns. ISBN 978-0-9314-6482-9. OCLC 29877702.
- ——— (1996). Israel in Egypt: the evidence for the authenticity of the Exodus tradition (PDF). New York: Oxford University Press. ISBN 978-0-195-09715-3. OCLC 35068244. Archived from the original (PDF) on 28 September 2025.
- ——— (1999). Barrett, David P. (ed.). The Books of the Old Testament. Quiknotes. Wheaton, IL: Tyndale House. ISBN 978-0-8423-5983-2. OCLC 33079242.
- ———; Millard, A. R., eds. (2004). The Future of Biblical Archaeology: reassessing methodologies and assumptions. Grand Rapids, MI: Eerdmans. ISBN 978-0-802-82173-7. OCLC 612468568.
- ——— (2005). Ancient Israel in Sinai: the evidence for the authenticity of the wilderness tradition. New York: Oxford University Press. ISBN 978-0-195-15546-4. OCLC 56526680.
- ——— (2008). The Archaeology of the Bible (1st ed.). Oxford: Lion. ISBN 978-0-745-95226-0. OCLC 181069121.
- ——— (2009). The Immigration Crisis: immigrants, aliens, and the Bible. Wheaton, IL: Crossway Books. ISBN 978-1-433-50607-9. OCLC 262891620.
- ———; Magary, Dennis Robert, eds. (2012). Do Historical Matters Matter to Faith?: a critical appraisal of modern and postmodern approaches to Scripture. Wheaton, IL: Crossway. ISBN 978-1-433-52571-1. OCLC 730405288.
- ———, ed. (2014). Tell el-Borg I: Excavations in North Sinai: the "Dwelling of the Lion" on the ways of Horus. Winona Lake, IN: Eisenbrauns. ISBN 978-1-575-06305-8. OCLC 890755746.
- ——— (2015). Akhenaten and the Origins of Monotheism (PDF). Oxford; New York: Oxford University Press. ISBN 978-0-199-79208-5. OCLC 883510631.
- ———; Wenham, Gordon J.; Sparks, Kenton L. (2015). Halton, Charles (ed.). Genesis : history, fiction, or neither?: three views on the Bible's earliest chapters. Counterpoints. Grand Rapids, MI: Zondervan. ISBN 978-0-310-51494-7. OCLC 898750289.
- ———; Millard, Alan R.; Rendsburg, Gary A., eds. (2016). "Did I Not Bring Israel Out of Egypt?": Biblical, Archaeological, and Egyptological Perspectives on the Exodus Narratives. Winona Lake, IN: Eisenbrauns. ISBN 978-1-57506-429-1. OCLC 935055589.
- ——— (2019). The Archaeology of the Bible (2nd ed.). Oxford: Lion Scholar. ISBN 978-1-912552-17-7. OCLC 1147869582.
- ———, ed. (2019). Tell el-Borg II: Excavations in North Sinai. Winona Lake, IN: Eisenbrauns. ISBN 978-1-57506-988-3. OCLC 1079401092.
- ——— (2021). The Prophets of Israel: Walking the Ancient Paths. Grand Rapids, MI: Kregel Academic. ISBN 978-0-8254-7011-0. OCLC 0825470110.
- ———; Averbeck, Richard E.; Howard, J. Caleb; Zwickel, Wolfgang, eds. (2022). "Now These Records are Ancient": Studies in Ancient Near Eastern and Biblical History, Language and Culture in Honor of K. Lawson Younger, Jr. Ägypten und Altes Testament. Vol. 114. Münster: Zaphon. ISBN 978-3-96327-191-5. OCLC 3963271914.
- ——— (2026). Israel in and Out of Egypt: The Archaeological and Historical Background to the Exodus. Peabody, MA: Hendrickson Publishers. ISBN 979-8-4005-1800-3. OCLC 1524235287.

=== Articles and chapters ===
- ——— (1997). "The Evangelical Contribution to Understanding the (Early) History of Ancient Israel in Recent Scholarship". Bulletin for Biblical Research. 7: 77–90. doi:10.2307/26422321. JSTOR 26422321.
- ——— (Spring 2000). "'The Heavens Declare the Glory of God': the limits of general revelation". Trinity Journal. 21 (1): 17–24.
- ——— (2003). "Egypt's Role in the Events of 701 BC: A Rejoinder to J. J. M. Roberts". In Vaughn, Andrew G.; Killebrew, Ann E. (eds.). Jerusalem in Bible and Archaeology: The First Temple Period. Society of Biblical Literature. pp. 219–234. ISBN 978-1-58983-066-0.
- ——— (Jan 2007). "Out of Egypt: The Archaeological Context of the Exodus". Biblical Archaeology Review. 33 (1): 30–41, 77.
- ——— (June 2007). "What is the Biblical Date for the Exodus? A Response to Bryant Wood". Journal of the Evangelical Theological Society. 50 (2): 225–47.
- ——— (Fall 2007). "Rameses of the Exodus Narratives is the 13th Century BC Royal Ramesside Residence". Trinity Journal. 28 (2): 281–289.
- ——— (2008), "Major Geographical Issues in the Accounts of the Exodus", in Israel: Ancient Kingdom or Late Invention, ed. D. Block, 97–129. Nashville, TN: Broadman and Holman
- ———; Kitchen, Kenneth A. (2007). "Reshep and Astarte in North Sinai: A Recently Discovered Stela from Tell El-Borg" (PDF). Ägypten und Levante / Egypt and the Levant. 17: 127–136. Archived from the original (PDF) on 3 October 2024.
- ——— (2008). "The Search for Migdol of the New Kingdom and Exodus 14:2: An Update". Buried History. 44: 3–12. doi:10.62614/e91a1q35.
- ———; Van Dijk, Jacobus (2010). "New Light on the Amarna Period from North Sinai". The Journal of Egyptian Archaeology. 96: 191–205. doi:10.1177/030751331009600111.
- ——— (2014). "The Exodus and Wilderness Narratives". In Arnold, Bill T.; Hess, Richard S. (eds.). Ancient Israel's History: An Introduction to Issues and Sources. Baker Academic. pp. 46–90. ISBN 978-1-4412-4634-9.
- ——— (2015). "Egyptologists and the Israelite Exodus from Egypt". In Levy, Thomas E.; Schneider, Thomas; Propp, William H. C. (eds.). Israel's Exodus in Transdisciplinary Perspective: Text, Archaeology, Culture, and Geoscience. Springer. pp. 197–208. ISBN 978-3-319-04768-3.
- ——— (2015–2016). Edmund S. Meltzer & Jacqueline E. Jay (ed.). "The Great Hymn to the Aten: The Ultimate Expression of Atenism?" (PDF). Journal of the Society for the Study of Egyptian Antiquities. XLII (42). Toronto, Canada: 43–55.
- ——— (2018). "A Possible Location in Northwest Sinai for the Sea and Land Battles between the Sea Peoples and Ramesses III". Bulletin of the American Schools of Oriental Research. 380: 1–25. doi:10.5615/bullamerschoorie.380.0001.
- ——— (2018–2019). Sarah L. Ketchley and Edmund S. Meltzer (ed.). "The Curious Phenomenon of Moving Military Sites on Egypt's Eastern Frontier" (PDF). Journal of the Society for the Study of Egyptian Antiquities. XLV (45). Toronto, Canada: 81–110.
- ——— (December 2021). "The Hebrew Exodus from and Jeremiah's Eisodus into Egypt in the Light of Recent Archaeological and Geological Developments". Tyndale Bulletin. 72: 73–95. doi:10.53751/001c.32999.
- ———; Rendsburg, Gary A. (March 2022). "Pithom and Rameses (Exodus 1:11): Historical, Archaeological, and Linguistic Issues (Part I)". Journal of Ancient Egyptian Interconnections. 33: 1–19. PDF Download Link
- ——— (2023). "Reflections on a Decade of Research and Excavations at Tell el-Borg and Its Environs (1998–2008)" (PDF). In el-Aguizy, Ola; Kasparian, Burt (eds.). Proceedings of the Twelfth International Congress of Egyptologists: ICE XII, 3rd-8th November 2019, Cairo, Egypt. Institut Français d'Archéologie Orientale (IFAO). pp. 151–165. ISBN 978-2-7247-0953-7.
- ——— (2023). "Tell el-Borg and the Ways of Horus in the Ramesside Era". In Abbas, Mohamed Raafat; Hoffmann, Friedhelm (eds.). Perspectives on the Ramesside Military System: Proceedings of the International Conference Held at the Institute for Egyptology and Coptology of LMU Munich, 10-11 December 2021. Ägypten und Altes Testament. Vol. 121. Zaphon. pp. 67–88. ISBN 978-3-96327-244-8.
- ——— (2024). "Abraham's Battle with the Mesopotamian Kings and His Encounter with Melchizedek". HIPHIL Novum. 9 (2): 22–36. doi:10.7146/hn.v9i2.152114.
- ——— (Summer 2025). "Judah's African Ally: Taharqa and the Kingdom of Cush". Biblical Archaeology Review. 51 (2): 42–48.
- ——— (2025). "A Survey of Some Egyptian Aspects of Political, Historic, and Toponymic Materials in the Book of Jeremiah". In Hays, Christopher B.; Huddlestun, John; Schneider, Thomas (eds.). Prophecy in the Hebrew Bible and Ancient Egypt. Ägypten und Altes Testament. Vol. 135. Zaphon. pp. 95–110. ISBN 978-3-96327-338-4.
