= Tel Habuwa =

Archaeological site in Egypt

Coordinates: 30.9352°N 32.3746°E

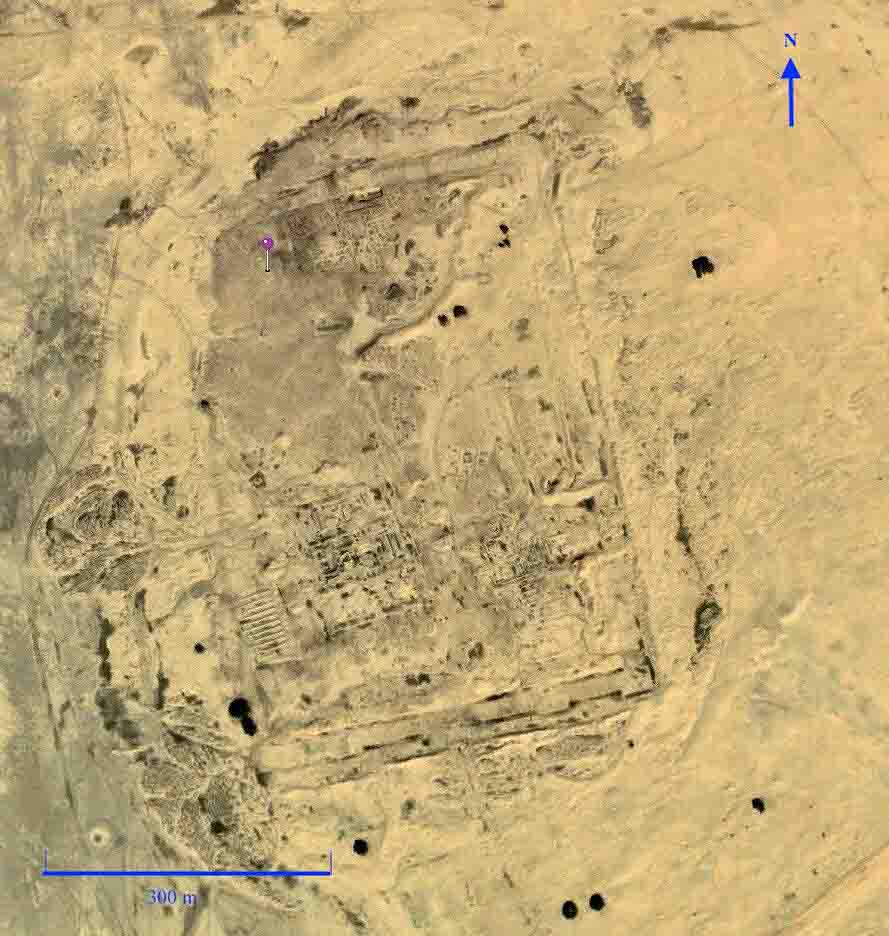
The site of Tel el-Hebua II. It was built in the New Kingdom and restored during the Saite period

Tel Habuwa (also Tell Heboua, Tell Habua) is an archaeological site in Lower Egypt, located 3 kilometers from the Suez Canal in the Ismailia Governorate. It was suggested by scholars that this is the Ancient Egyptian Eastern-border city called Tjaru from the Middle Kingdom of Egypt.

== Description ==
Double statue of Paser and Henut discovered at Tel Habuwa; gray granite, Ramesside period (1292 BC–1070 BC); Luxor Museum

The site consists of four sectors, labelled Tel Habuwa I, II, III and IV. The sites of Habuwa I and II are the largest of these sites.

In ancient times, a branch of the Pelusiac arm of the Nile passed between Tell Habuwa I and II before emptying into the Mediterranean.

Tell Heboua I is the oldest site; it goes back to the Middle Kingdom, and continued from there to the Saite times (26th Dynasty). On the other hand, Tell Heboua II dates back only to the beginning of the New Kingdom. Both of these sites continue on to the 26th Dynasty.

Tell Habuwa reached its maximum size during the Eighteenth Dynasty, when it occupied all four of these agglomerations.

Tel Habuwa III was a mainly New Kingdom settlement; there is a necropolis that remains there, and an old habitation area indicating a rather small town.

The site of Tell Heboua IV is located almost 2km south of Tell Heboua I. A cemetery of the 18th Dynasty is found there.

A closely related settlement Tell el-Borg is located almost directly east of Tell Heboua. The distance from the site of Tell Heboua II is about 5km.

The silos in Tel Habuwa could store up to 280 tons of grains, which led the scholars to believe that an army unit was stationed at the settlement. These silos were first built during the earlier history of the site, and expanded later.

== Excavations ==
Excavations by the Egyptian archaeological mission in northern Sinai, headed by Mohamed Abd el-Maksoud, were conducted from 1985 to 2015. They uncovered Tell Heboua I and Tell Heboua II.

Inscriptions and stelae from the New Kingdom confirmed the site's identification and significance. In particular, the scene of King Seti I's military campaign on the northern wall of Karnak temple seems to portray Tell Heboua I and II, as well as a canal between them. Also, the base of a small statue was found at Tell Heboua I in 2005-2006 mentioning the name 'Tharu' (TArw).

=== Hyksos remains ===
The 2013 excavations in the site had unearthed the remains of buildings from Thutmoses III and Seti I's reigns and beneath them what seems to be a two stories tall administration buildings and silos from the Hyksos period. These buildings associated with the Hyksos were heavily burnt.

Underneath the courtyard in one of the administrative buildings, there were coffins and skeletons found, the skeletons contained clear evidences of violent deaths: they had cutting marks on them and signs of arrows' spearheads that penetrated their bodies and injured them. The bodies were estimated to be the remains of the Hyksos forces who battled against Ahmose I, whose papyrus describing the burning of the city was also found in Tel Habuwa.

Two steles were also discovered in Tel Habuwa, they contained the names of a woman who seemingly was a Hyksos royalty, called "Tani" (dated to live circa 1570 BC), whose title was "Sister of the King", and of a Hyksos prince called "Nahsy", who is also mentioned in the Turin King List and in scarabs previously found in Egypt.

Three stelae of king Nehesy of the early 14th Dynasty have been found here. They bear Nehesy's birth name, and his throne name Aahsere.

The head of the excavation had offered that this site was attacked prior to Avaris' downfall to make sure that the Hyksos would not send messengers from Tel Habuwa to call back-up forces from Canaan (which is quite near) to aid them against Ahmose I's army.

=== Saite temple complex ===
In Tel Habuwa I were uncovered parts of a Saite temple complex. The main temple had pylons and was about 61.2 m long and 28.2 m wide. North east of the palace were excavated the remains of a palace and south of it were found the remains of a square building consisting of many casemates, forming a platform. Such buildings are known from others temple complexes. Their function is enigmatic.

== See also ==
- Way of Horus (Ancient Egypt)
- Nile Delta
- List of ancient Egyptian sites
