= Yabitiri =

Ruler of a city-state in southern Canaan

Yabitiri was a mayor/ruler of an unknown city/city-state in southern Canaan, during the 1350–1335 BC Amarna letters correspondence. The city he represented is in proximity to the two cities mentioned in his only Amarna letter, EA 296, (EA for 'el Amarna'). The two cities are Hazzatu-(modern city: Gaza), and Yapu-(biblical "Joppa", modern Yafo).

Yabitiri is not referenced by name, in any other letters of the 382–letter Amarna letters corpus.

The letter is presumably by the same scribe, with identical multiple phrasing, for the letters EA 266, 292, and 296, from southern Canaan cities/city-states.

== The letter of Yabitiri of city-state--? ==
=== EA 296, title: "Under the yoke" ===
(1-8)"Say to the king-(i.e. pharaoh), my lord, my god, my [Sun]: Message of Ya[bi]tiri, your servant, the dirt at your feet. I fall at the feet of the king, my lord, my god, my Sun, 7 times and 7 times.
(9-22)Moreover, I am indeed the loyal servant of the king, my lord. I looked this way, and I looked that way, and there was no light. Then I looked toward the king, my lord, and there was light. A brick: la-bi-tu may move from [un]der its partner–[brick], still I will not move from under the feet of the king, my lord.
(23-29)May the king, my lord, inquire of Yanhamu, his commissioner. When I was young, he brought me to Egypt-(named Mizri). I served the king, my lord, and I stood guard at the city gate of the king, my lord.
(30-35)May the king, my lord, inquire of his commissioner whether I now at this time guard the city gate of Azzatu and the city gate of Yapu, and (whether) where the archers of the king, my lord, march, I m[arch] with them. And indeed, now that I have [p]la[ced] the ... of the yoke: hu-ul-lu of the king, my lord, on my neck,–I carry it." -EA 296, lines 1-35 (complete, with 1-2 words(?) missing-lacuna)

=== The phrases of EA 296 ===
Some phrases of the Amarna letters are listed at : Amarna letters#Quotations and phrases.

Some of the phrasing of letter 296:

1. 7 times and 7 times
2. "I looked this way ..."—only used in letters EA 266, 292, 296, (along with partner bricks); See: Adda-danu, letter EA 292, title: "Like a Pot held in Pledge" .
3. "A brick may move ..."

== See also ==
- Gaza, (Hazzatu)
- Yafo, (Yapu)
- Amarna letters
- Amarna letters–phrases and quotations
- Adda-danu, for letter EA 292
