= Way of Horus (Ancient Egypt) =

Fortified trade route from the Nile to the Levant

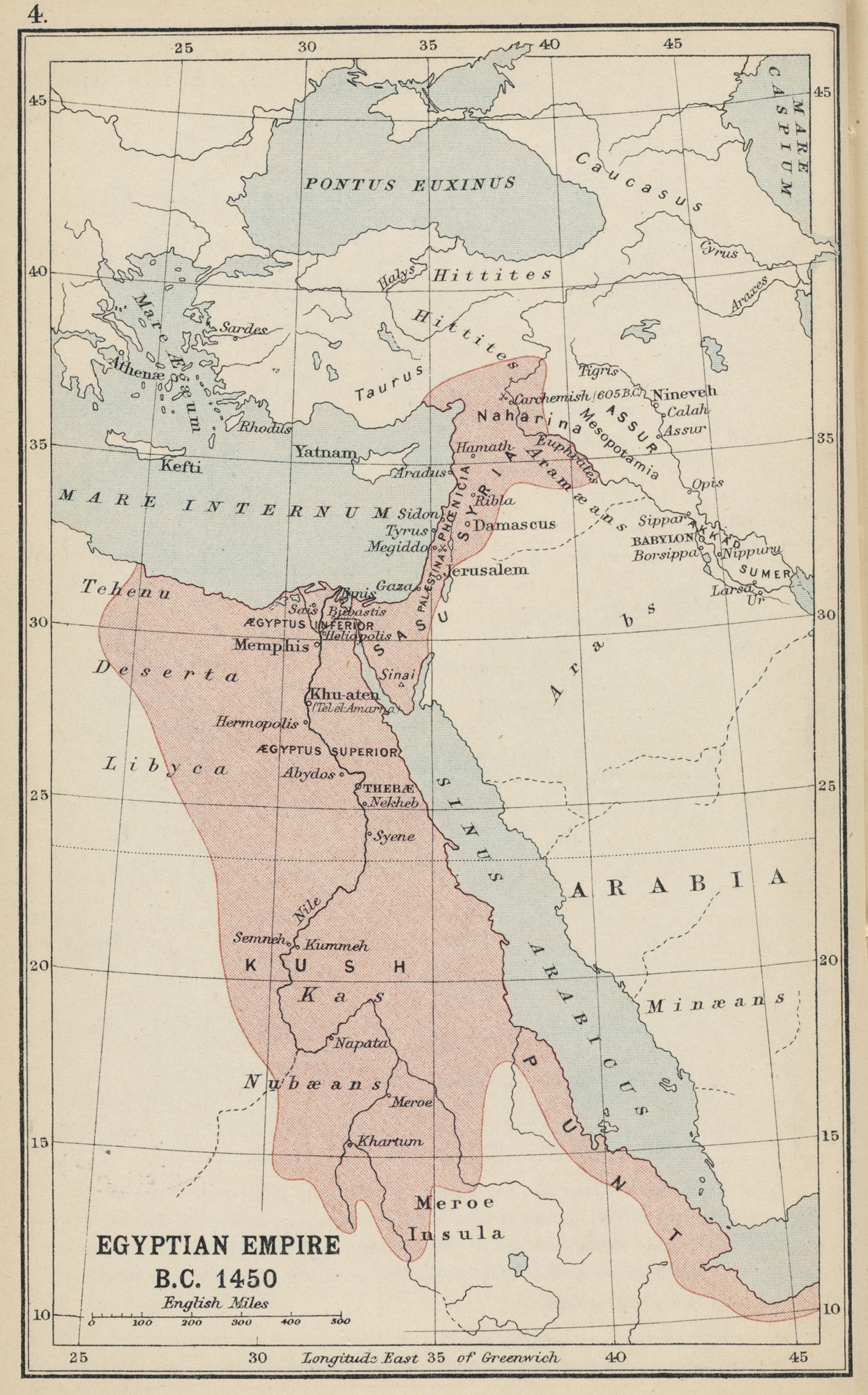
Egyptian Empire 1450 BC

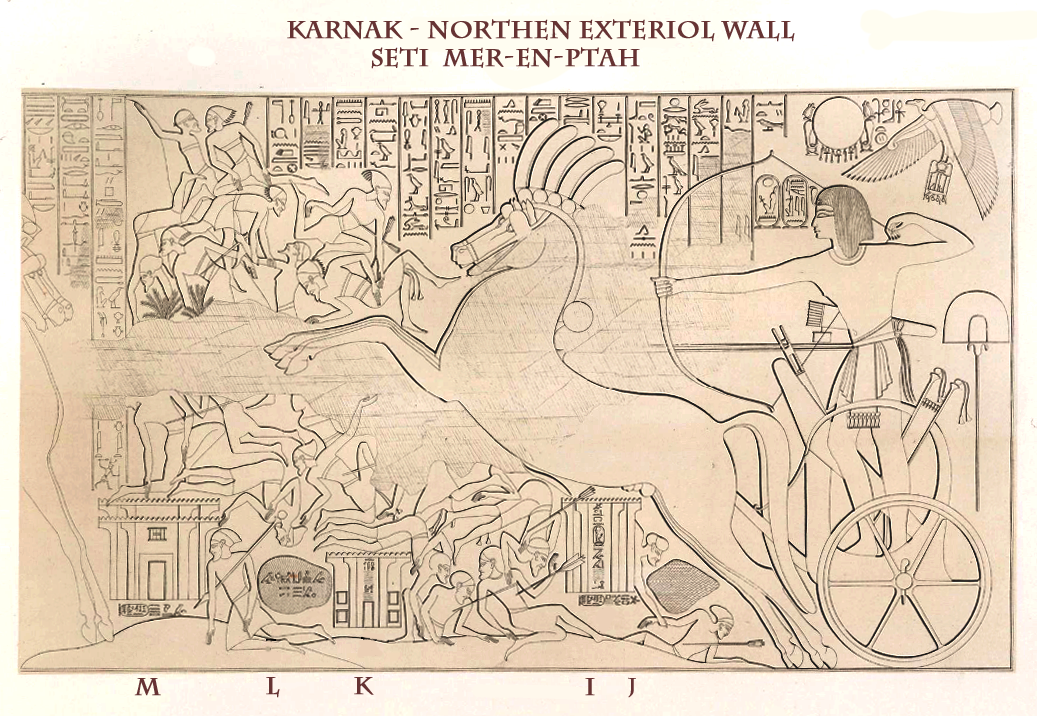
King Seti I defeating Shasu beduin on the road to Gaza, [L]The sheet of water, [K] Town which Majesty built newly, [I] The Castle of Men-Maat-re Seti-his protection, [J] The-Stronghold-of-Sety-Meneptah

The Way of Horus (alternatives: Horusway, wꜣwt Ḥr) (Note: Horus was the main god worshipped in Tanis area) was a route from the Nile Delta along the northern coast of the Sinai peninsula connecting Egypt with the Levant regions. It is known from the Old, Middle, and New Kingdom of Egypt maintained and controlled until the reign of the Saite kings of the 26th Dynasty (664–525 BC). This route played a significant role in political and cultural interactions with the Levant passing through envoys, traders, migrant workers, nomads, and urban dwellers from various areas of the Mediterranean and the Near East.
However, during the New Kingdom it was the main route for military expeditions to Palestine. As the most expedient land route between Egypt and Canaan, the Ways of Horus was of immense strategic importance Later version of the route became known as the Via Maris.

== Textural evidence ==
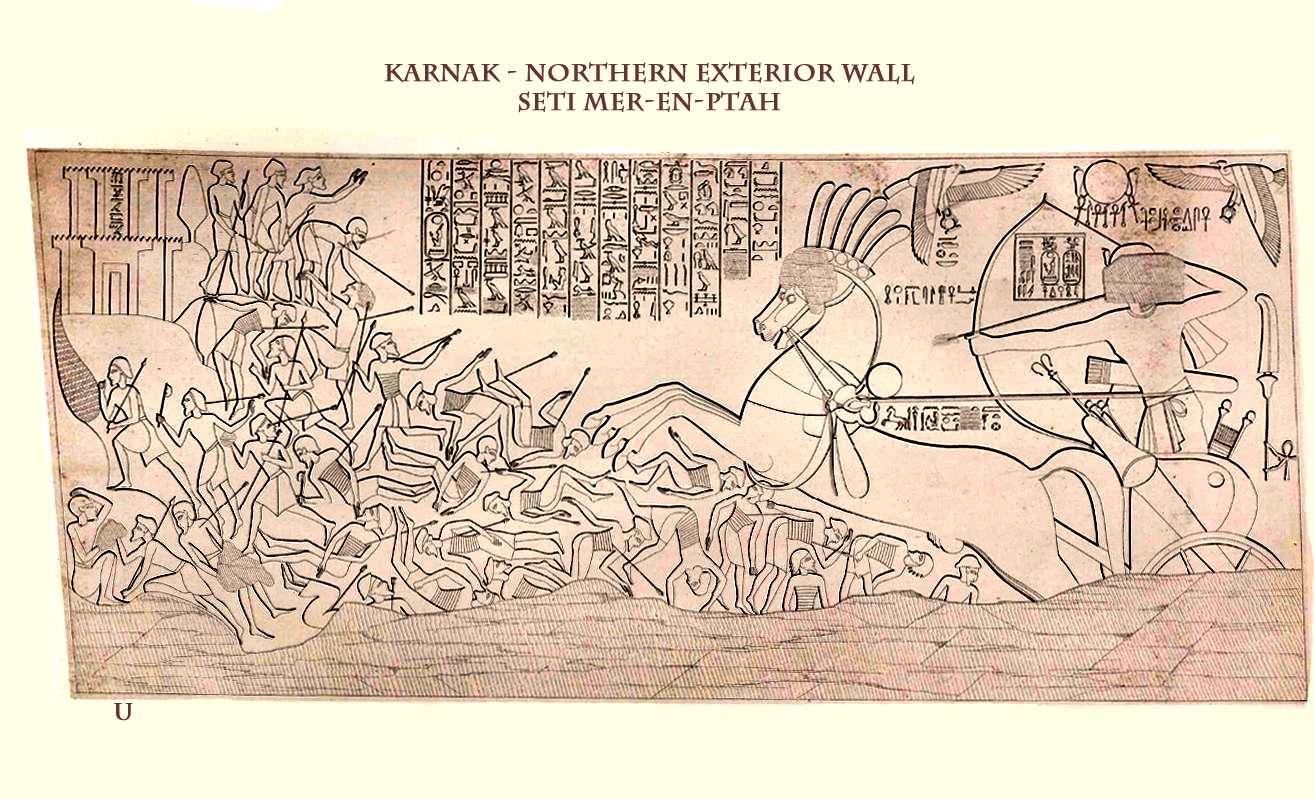
King Seti I attacking Shasu beduin near a town [U] Canaan

The oldest reference to the Way of Horus was found in the tomb G 8056 of the royal administrator vizier Hekni-Khnum, where among others there is also the title "Overseer of the Way of Horus" (imj r(ꜣ) wꜣ.t-Ḥr) (Note: Hieroglyph epigraphy "Horusway" used of the 5-6th.dynasty ) which logically relates of some administrative and logistical office existence. The tomb of Hekni-Khnum is dated to the late 5th Dynasty.

It turns up again in the First Intermediate Period in The Instruction to Merikare, a series of policy decisions made supposedly from an agin king Khety III

(Note: Kheti could be king Nebekare Kheta (Neb-kau-ra) of the 9th-10th dynasty, Merikara his successor) to his son Merykara. Transcription and translation from the torso papyri (Note: Papyri Hermitage 1116A, Moscow Pushkin Museum of Fine Arts 4658 and Carlsberg 6, all late 18th Dynasty) have preserved 306 stanzas, one of which, referring to the Horus way, states:

All kinds of large towns are in it
What was ruled by one is in the hands of ten
Officials are appointed, tax list draw up
When free men are given land
They work for you like a single team
No rebel will arise among them,
And Hapy will not fail to come
The dues fo Northland are in your hand
For the mooring-post is staked in the district
I made in to East from Hebenu to Horusway (Note: Fortress Tjaru at Tell el-Heboua I)

The oldest attested papyrus which contains the Tale of Sinuhe takes place during the reign of Amenemhat I and his son Senusret I created around 1860 BC. Stanza 42 features Sinuhe telling the story of when he arrived at the Egyptian frontier checkpoint at garrison-tower of Wawet-Hor:

This servant arrived south,
I touched at the ways of Horus, (Note: I halted at the Way of Horus )
And the commander there who was organising patrols
Sent a message to the Residence to inform them
Then his Majesty sent the good overseer of foragers (Note: overseer of foragers" is the official apparently entrusted with guaranteeing palace supplies of the materials brought in from outside the agricultural economy, Gardiner translated it as "trusty head-fowler" of the King's House and Erman as "Farmers' leader of the royal estates")
Followed by ships laden with the gifts of before the king
For the Syrians who came along with me to bring me to the ways of Horus
I pronounced each of them by his name
All the cupbearers were busy at their tasks
I received and the captain loaded for me,
And there was kneading and straining beside me until I reached the landing of Itj(tawy)

Papyrus Anastasi I, in Gardiner's translation of a hieratic satirical text, were was the military scribe Hori writes to his younger colleague, the scribe Amenemope where he mentiond the names of sites on the road between the fortress city of Tjaru and the Philistine City of Canaan. This provided a possible source for en interpretation of the scenes on the North wall of Karnak depicting the conquest of Seti I. there. In one passage, the scribe Hori states:

Oh What’s your name, you elite scribe and Maher-warrior, who know how to use your hands, a leader of Naarin-troops at the head of the soldiery, I have described to you the hill countries of the northern reaches of the land of Canaan, but you have not answered me in any way nor have you rendered a report to me. Come, and I will describe many things to you. Head to ward the fortress of the Ways of Horus. I begin for you with the Dwelling of Sese you have not set foot in it at all. You have not eaten fish from its pool nor bathed in it. O that I might recall to you Husayin. Whereabouts is its fortress? Come now to the region of Edjo of Sese, into its stronghold of Usermare and to Seba-El and Ibesgeb. I will describe to you the appearance of Aiyanin. You are not acquainted with its location. As for Nekhes and Heberet, you have not visited them since your birth. You Maher-warrior, where is Raphia

== Route fortifications ==
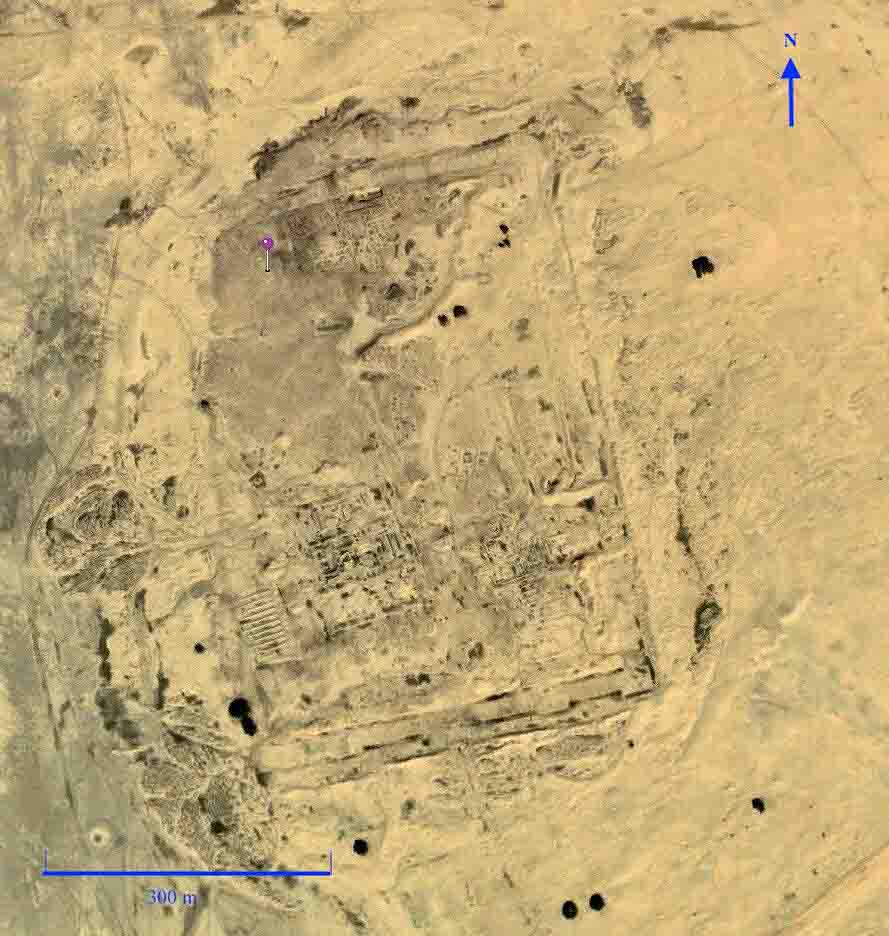
Fortress Tel el-Hebua II built in the New Kingdom and restored in the Seite period near Pelusic branche (period~665 BC); bird's eye view of the ruins from a height of ~800m

The Horus Way was a long road lined with fortresses that protected the eastern front of Egypt from invaders seeking access to the fertile Nile Delta. During the New Kingdom period (1580–1080 BC), it was a key starting point for Egyptian military campaigns into Palestine and Syria. The Horus way starting at Tell el Hebua II fort, located about 3 km north-east of present-day Qantara, and ending after ~180 km at the Egyptian border town of Rafah. Military expeditions aimed to capture territories in Palestine and Syria, along the northeastern coast to the city of Canaan. The military units had to cover a total distance of ~220 km to cover a total distance mainly through sandy, rocky terrain of the Nagev desert without the possibility of obtaining food and potable water for the infantry and the animal-drawn chariots. There were up to 17 expeditions of pharaoh Tuthmosis III with his army numbering up to 10,000 soldiers who spent 10 days on the way from Tjaru to Canaan, in the case of Ramesses II’s expedition to Kadesh, there were 20,000 people who had to pass through the Horus way to reach the goal of a military mission.

There were a number of administrative and workshop buildings, grain stores, and wells with drinking water. The city of Bir al-Abd was fortified with a mud-brick wall. The unfortified buildings at Tell el-Ajjul and Deir al-Balah, on the other hand, appear to have served a slightly different function. Both centres were located very close to the eastern end of the way of Horus, where officials were primarily stationed and maintained an Egyptian presence in this border area. In cooperation with officials and military units stationed in Gaza, Tel Lachish and the Egyptians based in Deir el-Balah and Tell el-Ajju controlled the movement of goods and travellers, nomads and the local population.

Early in his reign year 23th, Thutmose III met and overthrew the allied Syrians at Megiddo,
which he besieged and captured, and although he marched northward to the southern end of Lebanon,
he was far from able to reach and punish Kadesh. But he established a fortress in the southern Lebanon,
to prevent another southward advance by the king of Kadesh, and then returned home.

The gradually built fortresses on Egyptian territory served as barracks, logistical basses and service works. Wells were dug along the route at distances approximately one day's walk (~20 km). It is therefore reasonable to assume that the chain of forts and wells across northern Sinai was part of a postulated system of building with administrative control, as is confirmed by the recorded titles of officials. Other fortresses in the conquered territories were manned by a permanent garrison to maintain Egyptian influence in the area.

Text from the reign of Thutmose III, with relevance to the reign of Thutmose I:
The king’s herald overseer of the treasury, the valiant one Sennefer,
justified established by the overseer of the storehouse
in the Way of Horus, Djehuty-hay-tep justified.

During the Middle Kingdom period (2000 - 1700 BC ) the Egyptian army extended as far as the Tigris and Euphrates rivers, supporting its position with a long chain of heavily fortified settlements at the most vulnerable points of the trade route from the East.

== Karnak reliefs ==
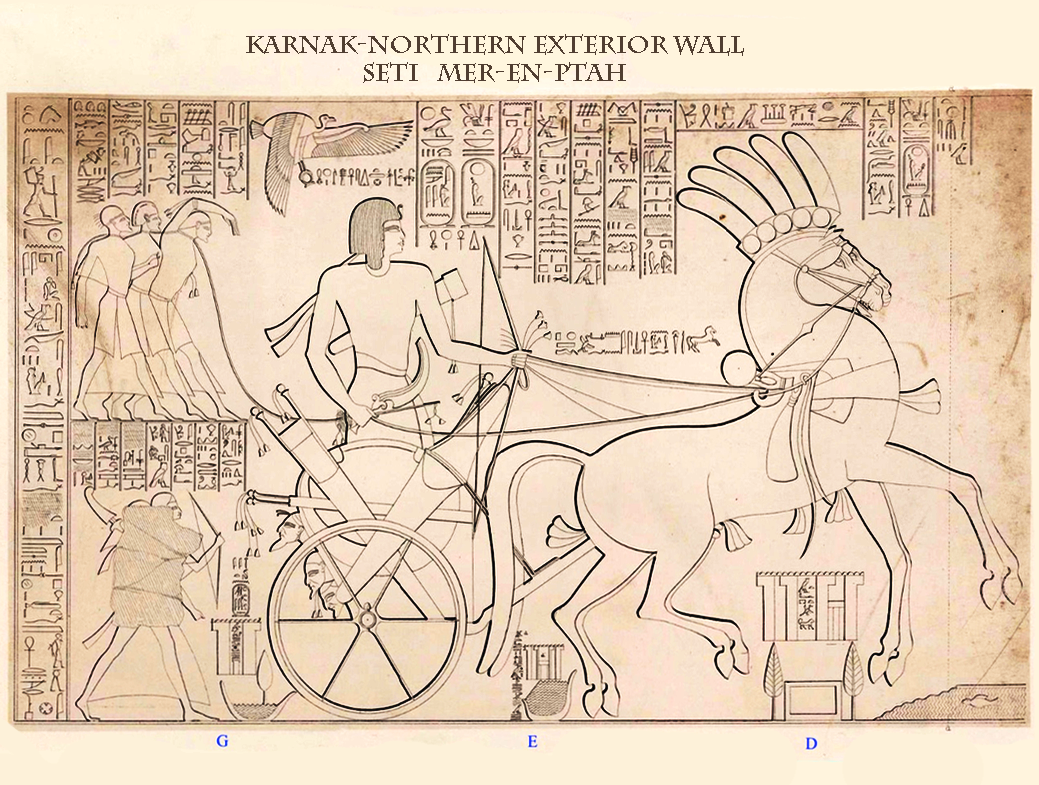
King Seti I accompanied by Prince brings Shasu captives; forts: (G) Buto-of-Sety-Meneptah,(E) The-Migdol-of-Menmaꜣrēꜣ (D) The-Dwelling-of-the-Lion

The Shasu battle scenes of Seti I on the outside north wall of Karnak temple have long served as the basis for our understanding to the eastern defence network in New Kingdom times. Of special interest to our understanding of the military picture on Egypt’s eastern frontier and across north Sinai is the series of forts and wells most of which are named. Located on the northern, outer wall of the Hypostyle hall, the panorama is divided up into four or five vignettes that extends also eastward around the corner onto the eastern face of the eastern wall of the hall. The reliefs are arranged in three rows, one above the other, all of the top row being lost except one scene. The only date read on these reliefs is the first year of Seti's reign, which occurs only on reliefs from the Shasu campaign, which was the conquest of Palestine and part of southern Syria and the final completion of the return to Thebes, all in one year.

These reliefs form the most important document surviving from Seti 1's reign, being practically our only source for his wars. Their function was unfortunately religious and a glorification of the wars of Sethi I accompanied by a few modest explanatory inscriptions attached to the main actors in each scene. The inscriptions translationon of these reliefs was done by Breasted and subsequently by others such as Gardiner, and also, last but not least, in great details by the University of Chicago. The common source is the pictorial scenes published by Lepsius and Resellini, respectively. The most frequently cited Gardiner lists the names of 12 objects along the Way of Horus.

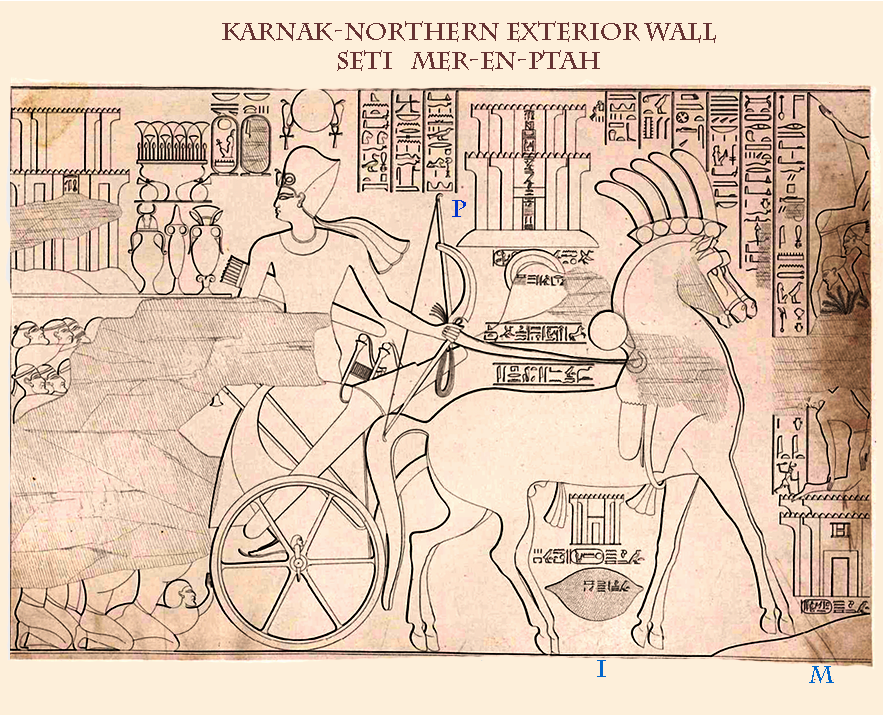
King Seti I. receiving tribute from asiatic Prince;, (I)The-Castle-of-Menmaꜣrēꜣ, (M)The well of Sety Meneptah, (P)-The well of Sety Meneptah

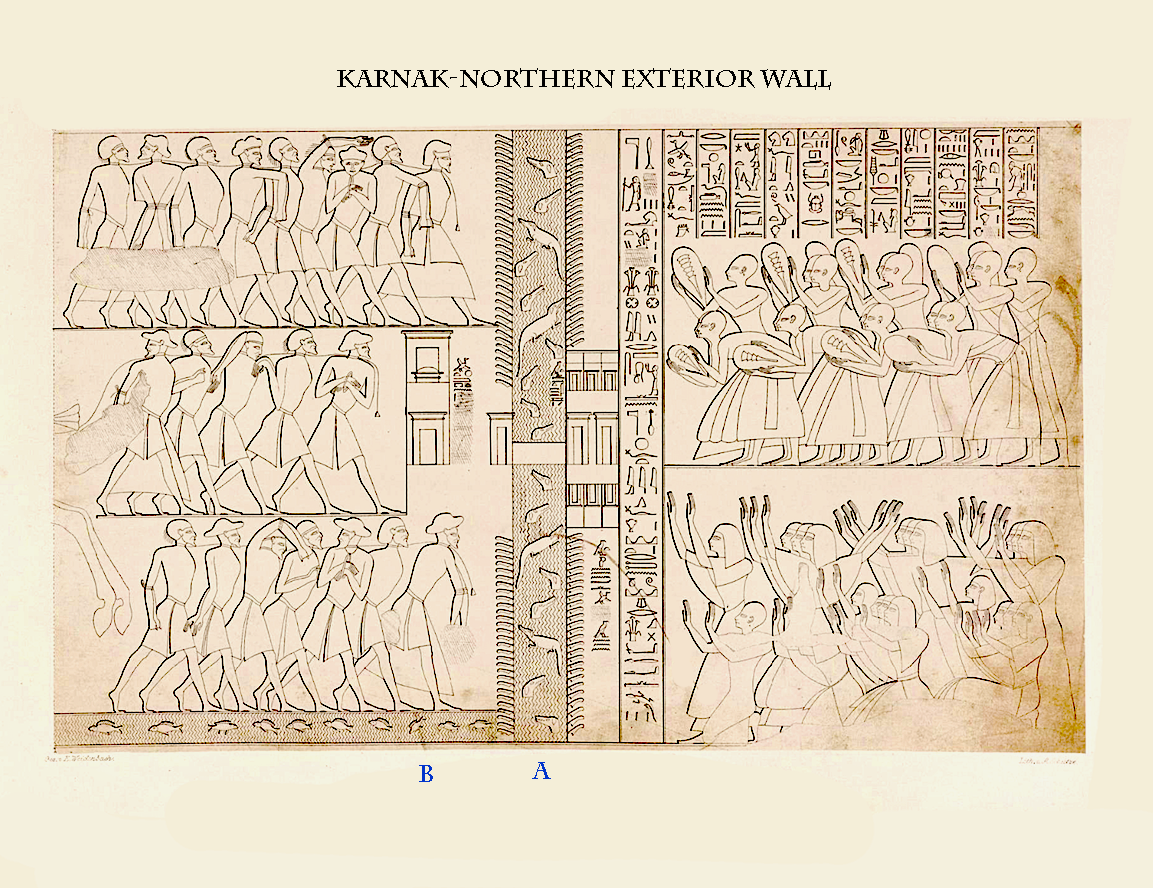
Shasu captives being brought to the fortress of Tjaru, priests welcoming King Seti; (B) Fortress Tjaru, (A) The dividing-waters (canal)

Paleo-environmental and geomorphological studies of the region have established that Tell Heboua I was located on a narrow strip of land, or isthmus, that marked the Mediterranean coast during the second millennium BC. In addition, at that time a branch of the Pelusium Nile passed between Tell el-Heboua I and II and flowed into the open sea.

== Modern assessment ==
Based on the new material and the previously known military nature of sites in the area, the excavators observed that clearly the Gaza region was of prime strategic military importance to the Egyptian New Kingdom empire in Syria and Palestine, and would have been crucial for the movement by land certainly and presumable also by sea of traded commodities and military and administrative personnel between Egypt and Palestine.

So the Way of Horus from the starting fortress of Tell Heboua II followed for about 4 km to the fortress of Tell el-Borg The dwelling of the Lion Ramesse II then skirted the southern tip of the lagoon and the fortress of The-Migdol-of-Menmaꜣrēꜣ Ramesse III further north-east to Tell Abyad Wedjet district of Ramesse II, passed Bir al-Abd to Tell el Herr and then headed towards to border town of Rafah.

In this context, the Way of Horus is an important part of Egyptian history, especially during rising the expansion of the New Kingdom era, but also of subsequent defeats, whether by the Achaemenids or in the late Greco-Roman era. However, it has retained its strategic importance until modern times, as the highway from El Qantara East, Al-Arisch to the Egyptian border at Rafah passes through it, which in fact almost copies the route of the historical Way of Horus.

== See also ==
- Via Maris
- Seti I
