= Hussein El Gebaly =

Egyptian artist (1934–2014)

Hussein El Gebaly, also known as Hussein El Gebali
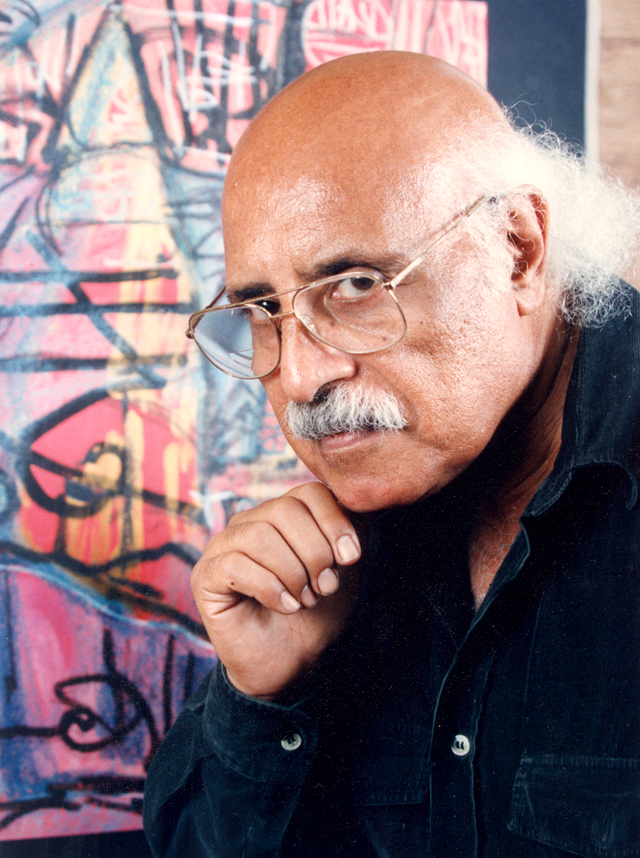

Personal details
- Born: May 18, 1934 Giza, Egypt
- Died: January 18, 2014 (aged 79)
- Occupation: Graphic Artist ex-president of Syndicate of Plastic Arts - Professor of Graphic Arts Department - Faculty of Fine Arts - ex-president of Graphic Arts Department- Faculty of Fine Arts

Hussein El Gebaly (Arabic: حسين الجبالي) (18 May 1934 – 18 January 2014) was an Egyptian artist.

== Artist Biography ==
He received his diploma from the Faculty of Fine Arts in Cairo in 1958, and his diploma of the Higher Institute for Artistic Education in 1959. Studies in the Faculty of Education in Ain Shams University in 1964. He optioned a scholarship from the Italian Government for three years from 1965 to 1968. He optioned the diploma of specialization in lithography from the state Institute for Fine Arts and Book Drawing Urbino in Italy, 1967.

A scientific mission from the Netherlands Government to study Lithograph Arts and Printing with the Silk screen for nine months in 1976. He received an invitation from the U.S. Government to spend a month to visit the ateliers, laboratories and special academies in graphic arts in 1980.

He worked as a professor in the Faculty of Fine Arts in Alexandria, Minya and Leonard Da Vinci Institute. He supervised many artists in Helwan and Minya Universities. He participated in the Ph.D. and MA assertions in the above-mentioned universities as well as the Academy of Arts.

Professor and ex-president of Graphic Arts Department - Faculty of Fine Arts – in Cairo - University of Helwan. Ex-president of Syndicate of Plastic Arts in Egypt. President of the National Association of Contemporary Egyptian Graphic Arts with Egyptian and Foreign Artistes.

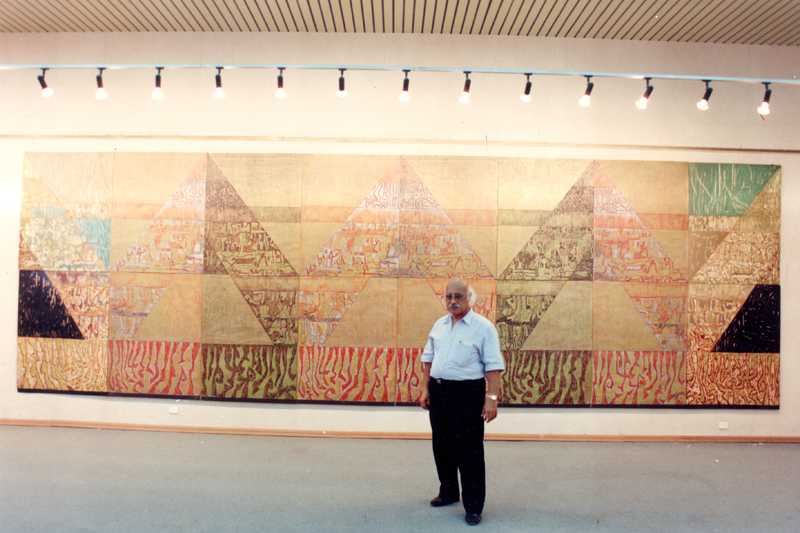
Hussein El Gebaly with his graphic art work

== Prizes ==
- The Silver Medal from the Organization of Activating Tourism, Anacin in Italy - 1976.
- Second Prize at Alexandria Biennial, Egypt - 1977.
- The Prize of the Collection from Organization of Activating Tourism, Alexandria Egypt - 1978.
- The State Prize for Encouraging Arts in 1979.
- Medal of Arts & Sciences, First Grade, Egypt - 1979.
- The Prize Collection for Biennial Lubjliana - 1987.
- The Second Prize in Biennial of Graphic Arts on Wood Cut in Czechoslovakia – 1991.
- The Golden Medal in the Trinali of Fredrick, Stad - 1989.
- He optioned many Diplomas & Certificates of appreciation.
- He was chosen to be a member in the international committee of Arbitration for the Biennial of Ukraine - 1991.
- He optioned the Triennial Prize of Cairo - 1993 1.g medal.
- He was chosen to be the guest of honor of the Third International Triennial for Graphic Art - 1999.
- The State incentive prize (state merit award) for his services to the arts – Egypt - 2000.
- Medal of Arts & Sciences, First Grade, Egypt - 2000 .
