= Shaware3na =

- Formation: 2012
- Type: Theatre group
- Purpose: Street Art
- Location: Cairo, Egypt
- Artistic director: Mahatat
- Website: http://www.mahatatcollective.com

Shaware3na (English: Our Streets) is the launch project for Mahatat; a newly founded arts organization that promotes art in public spaces. Shaware3na consists of four projects to be held between January 2012 and 23 June 2012: The Art of Transit, Cinema Sky, Stop and Dance and The Tree Project. Performances and events are held in public spaces such the Cairo Metro, coffeehouses, public buildings and squares including the Tahrir Square as well as in front of kiosks.

== History ==
Shaware3na is the launching project of Mahatat, a newly founded arts organization that started in 2011 as part of a post-revolutionary revival of the arts scene in Cairo. Mahatat describes itself as a "collective that arose from the passion, conviction, dedication and vision of individuals to encourage the mobility of art in public space." It was co-founded by five women: Astrid Thews, Heba El Cheikh, Marie Girod, Mayada Said, and Myriam Makhou.

== Projects ==
=== The Art of Transit ===
The Art of Transit is the first project of Shaware3na to take place and consists of pantomime performances taking place in Cairo Metro's underground lines. Participant artists wave between one metro wagon and another to hold short performances and silently communicate with commuters. Amr Abd El-Aziz, an Egyptian pantomime artist, has been known to perform mainly on Friday mornings. Further participants include the clown duo Kouta Hamra (Red Tomatoes) by Aly Sobhy and Ahmed Mostafa. A short theatre performance by Hani Taher, Dina El-Sayed, and Maha Monieb. The Bussy project consists of feminist monologues held inside the metro. Some women have become emotional upon hearing the monologues and have wanted to share their own stories. The issue of sexual harassment has prompted many audience members to get involved in the conversations.

=== Cinema Sky ===
Cinema Sky was announced as part of the Shaware3na project as screenings of short films. Like the Kazeboon campaign, Cinema Sky screens its videos on the street using projectors.

=== Stop and Dance ===
Stop and Dance refers to workshops for non-professional dancers held by modern dancers Karima Mansour, Paulina Almeida and Birgitt Bodingbauer. Dancing styles include breakdance, the Brazilian martial art and dance, capoeira, and parkour in public spaces.

=== The Tree Project ===
The Tree Project refers to participatory art project of creating artistic designs for tree in the Cairo neighborhood of Dokki.

== Reception ==
Shaware3na has been featured in the newspapers, such as the English-language version of Al-Ahram and the Arabic Al-Shorouk.
