= Tjaru =

Ancient Egyptian fortress

Coordinates: 30.9352°N 32.3746°E

G47 Z1 E23 Z1 O49 or G47 G1 D21 Z7 O49
ṯꜣr(l) or ṯꜣr(l)w
in hieroglyphs
Era: New Kingdom
(1550–1069 BC)

G47 E23 X1 N25 O49 or G47 E23 X1 O49
ṯꜣr(l)(t)
in hieroglyphs
Era: Ptolemaic dynasty
(305–30 BC)

Tjaru (Ancient Egyptian: ṯꜣrw) was an ancient Egyptian fortress on the Way of Horus or Horus military road, the major road leading out of Egypt into Canaan. It was known in Greek as Selē (Ancient Greek: Σελη), in Latin as Sile or Sele, and in Coptic as Selē or Slē (Coptic: Ⲥⲉⲗⲏ or Ⲥⲗⲏ). It has been suggested that its remains form the Tel el-Habua near Qantarah.

== History ==
The Horus of Mesen was worshipped at Tjaru in the form of a lion, and because of its close theological connections to Edfu, it is sometimes referred to as the Edfu of Lower Egypt.

Tjaru, being a frontier town in an inhospitable desert region, was a place of banishment for criminals. Horemheb in his Great Edict threatens as punishment for various crimes by officials disfigurement and banishment to Tjaru. This is the origin of why Tjaru was referred to as Rhinocorura by later Ancient Greek authors.

== References in the Amarna letters ==
Silu is referenced twice in one letter of the 382–Amarna letters correspondence of 1350-1335 BC. The letter refers to Turbazu, the presumed 'mayor'/ruler of Silu, who is "..slain in the city gate of Silu." Two other mayors are also slain at the city gate of Silu. Turbazu's death is also reported in one additional letter of the Amarna letters, EA 335, (EA for 'el Amarna').

=== Part of EA 288, letter of Abdi-Heba of Jerusalem ===
Abdi-Heba's letters, to the Egyptian pharaoh, are of moderate length, and topically discuss the intrigues of the cities, that are adjacent to Jerusalem.

A section of letter 288, title: "Benign neglect", (starting at line 17):

"[...]
".... I gave over [to his char]ge 10 slaves, Šuta, the commissioner of the king, ca[me t]o me; I gave over to Šuta's charge 21 girls, [8]0 prisoners, as a gift for the king, my lord. May the king give thought to his land; the land of the king is lost. All of it has attacked me. I am at war as far as the land of Šeru and as far as Ginti-kirmil. All the mayors are at peace, but I am at war. I am treated like an 'Apiru, and I do not visit the king, my lord, since I am at war. I am situated like a ship in the midst of the sea. The strong hand (arm) of the king took the land of Nahrima-(Mittani), and the land of Kasi, but now the 'Apiru have taken the very cities of the king. Not a single mayor remains to the king, my lord; all are lost. Behold, Turbazu was slain in the city gate of Silu-(Tjaru). The king did nothing. Behold, servants who were joined to the 'Api[r]u smote Zimredda of Lakisu, and Yaptih-Hadda was slain in the "city gate" of Silu. The king did nothing. [Wh]y has he not called them to account? May the king [pro]vide for [his land] and may he [se]e to it tha[t] archers [come ou]t to h[is] land. If there are no archers this year, all the lands of the king, my lord, are lost."
"...." -end of line 53 (lines 54-66(End), omitted)

== Identification as Tell Heboua ==
There has been historical argument over which archaeological site should be identified as Tjaru. Throughout the 20th century, Tjaru has been identified as Tel Abu-Seifa, 4 km east of Qantarah. After excavations in the late 20th and early 21st century, the current consensus is that Tell Heboua, near Qantarah, is the most likely site of the fortress. Tell Heboua is upon a kurkar ridge, giving it the strategic advantage of high ground.

Excavations by the Supreme Council of Antiquities at Tell Heboua began in 1988. Archaeologists first proposed that Tell Heboua, not Tel Abu-Seifa, was the Pharaonic-era fortress of Tjaru around 2000. In July 2007, the confirmation of the ancient fortress at Tell Heboua as Tjaru was announced, with graves of soldiers and horses, mud-brick walls, and a moat. Further discoveries were announced in 2008, including reliefs depicting Pharaohs Thutmose II, Seti I and Ramesses II. In January 2015, new discoveries at the site were announced that confirmed its identification as the fort of Tjaru.

== See also ==
- Walls-of-the-Ruler
