= North Sinai Archaeological Sites Zone =

The North Sinai Archaeological Sites Zone is composed of a collection of important ancient sites between the Suez Canal and Gaza along the Mediterranean coast of Egypt.

== Archaeology ==
In 2020, a limestone cave decorated with scenes of animals such as donkeys, camels, deer, mule and mountain goats was uncovered in the area of Wadi Al-Zulma by the archaeological mission from the Tourism and Antiquities Ministry. Rock art cave is 15 meters deep and 20 meters high.

== World Heritage Status ==
This site was added to the UNESCO World Heritage Tentative List on November 1, 1994, in the Cultural category.
