= History of agriculture in Palestine =

A 1924 survey of Palestinian land. The best agricultural land is colored purple and is near the coast from Haifa to south of Tel Aviv. Tan and brown shaded land is of medium quality. The poorest land is colored yellow.

The history of agriculture in Palestine dates back to 8000 BCE and some of the earliest agricultural settlements in the world. Several of the crops grown by the earliest farmers continued to be important throughout the long history of Palestinian agriculture. In the 19th century CE the Ottoman Empire discouraged, with limited success, the long-standing communal land system called musha'a practiced by the Palestinian Arab farmers living in the highlands. Wheat and barley were their most important crops and were grown primarily for subsistence rather than the commercial market. Olives are an important traditional crop. In the late 19th century Palestinians began to grow commercial and export crops such as citrus in the lowlands near the Mediterranean Sea coast. Large landowners, both resident and non-resident, owned a large part of the land, especially near the coast.

In 1882, Jewish immigrants, with financing and technical assistance from abroad, began to purchase land and establish agricultural settlements in the coastal area of the Holy Land. Jewish farmers focused on producing commercial and export crops such as vegetables and citrus. By 1941, Jews owned 24.5 percent of the cultivated land in Palestine. Most Palestinians continued to live in the highlands and practice subsistence agriculture.

The partition of Palestine into the country of Israel and the Palestinian territories in 1947–1948 resulted in a war in which most Palestinian farmers living in Israel were dispossessed of their land which was subsequently farmed by Israelis. More land farmed by Palestinians in the Palestinian territories (and subsequent State of Palestine) has since been gained by Israel as a result of wars and uprisings and Israeli settlements. Israeli policies limiting the supply of water and access to farmland by Palestinians have had deleterious impacts on Palestinian agriculture.

== Early agriculture ==
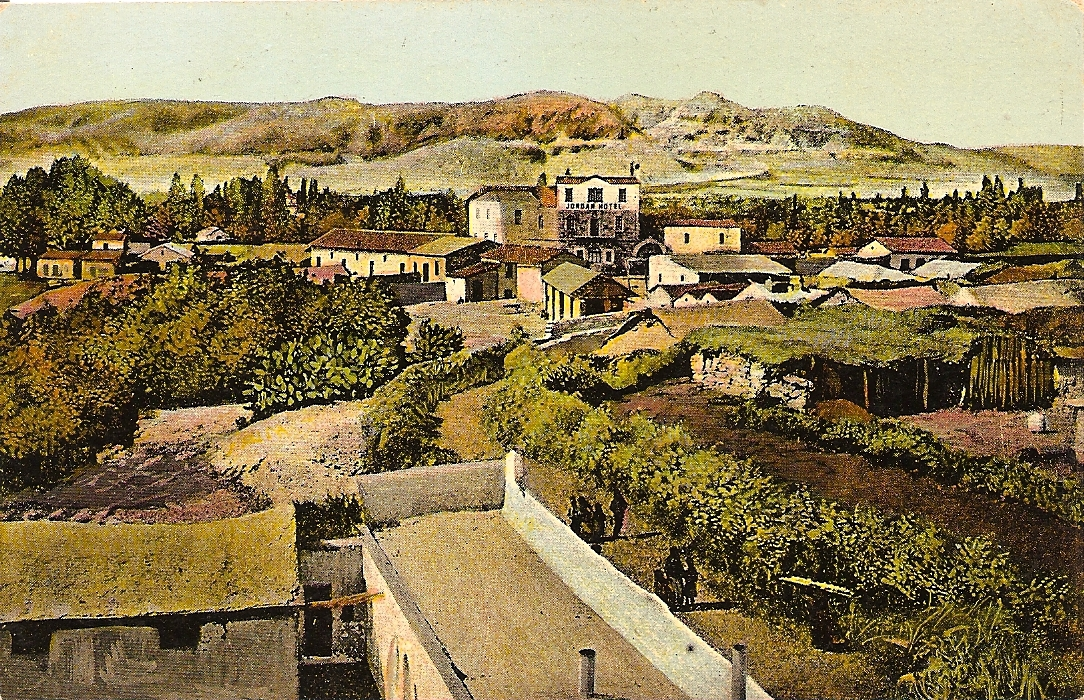
Jericho, c. 1900

Jericho, near the Jordan River in Palestine, is one of the oldest agricultural settlements in the world dating to 8,000 BCE or earlier. Eight founder crops were grown at that time or shortly thereafter: three cereals (Einkorn and emmer wheat and barley); four pulses (lentils, peas, chickpeas, and bitter vetch), and flax The fig tree may have been domesticated even earlier, possibly around 9000 BCE. The olive tree was domesticated about 6000 BCE. Citrus trees originated in Southeast Asia but were introduced into Palestine during the first millennium BCE. The early farmers of Palestine had four important domesticated animals: goats, sheep, oxen, and camels.

The importance of Palestinian agriculture was attested in the 10th century by the Palestinian geographer Al-Maqdisi who cited olives, cotton, grapes, and sugar cane among the crops of the region. In the 16th century, Franciscan priest Francesco Suriano added apples, citrus, and sesame to the list of important Palestinian crops. Cotton and sesame were exported to Europe from the 16th century onward.

== Ottoman rule ==
The Ottoman Empire conquered the Palestinian region in 1516 and ruled until World War I (1914–1918). Under pressure from European rivals and steeped in a traditional system, the Ottomans attempted a modernization and reform of their society during the Tanzimat period beginning in 1839. Among the reforms was a 1867 law which permitted foreigners to own land in the Ottoman Empire.

In the mid-19th century most Palestinians lived in the hills and mountains that run down the center of the region. This was due to the prevalence of malaria and the danger of Bedouin raids in the lowlands. The highlands were densely populated compared to the lowlands. Many highland villages also owned land in the lowlands and established satellite settlements there. The population in the lowlands increased towards the end of the 19th century as population pressure forced highland farmers to migrate and the Ottomans pushed the Bedouin tribes eastward beyond the Jordan River. Opportunities to profit from commercial agriculture for export also motivated highlanders to move toward the Mediterranean Coast on the west and the Dead Sea and Jordan River on the east. The years after 1856 were a period of economic growth for Palestine, especially for agricultural exports to Europe and regional markets.

Wheat and barley were the most important crops, grown on 75 percent of cultivated land. Yields were best in the northern Jordan valley and the lowland coast with many highland areas having poor yields. Most of the wheat and barley was consumed by the farmers rather than sold. Olive cultivation was common or poorer lands in the highlands both for home use and as a cash crop. Grapes were grown in the vicinity of Hebron. Citrus production expanded in the latter decades of the 19th century near the Mediterranean and was an important export.

In addition to farming in fertile plains and hill terraces, Palestinian villagers and nomadic groups also developed unique forms of agriculture in the coastal dunefields (rimāl). In regions such as Rimal Yibna, Rimal Isdud, al-Nabi Rubin, and Gaza's al-mawasi district, cultivators planted figs, vines, and olives among the dunes, while also establishing irrigated sunken gardens (mawāṣī) that tapped shallow groundwater. These practices, which combined orchard belts, seasonal field crops, and sunken plots, transformed marginal lands officially classified as uncultivable mawāt into productive agricultural landscapes. Research shows that by the 1930s and 1940s, villagers of Yibna and neighboring Bedouin groups had managed to cultivate up to 10 percent of the dunefield, though continuous maintenance was required to resist sand encroachment. Similar systems were documented further south around Ashdod-Yam (Isdud).

Theoretically, almost all the agricultural land in the empire was owned by the Ottoman state, but inheritable rights to use the land was granted to individuals and villages. The most important systems of land tenure for agriculture in Palestine were musha'a (also masha'a) and mafrouz, a land tenure system that roughly corresponds to the European concept of private property. Mafrouz land made up only a small percentage of agricultural land. The larger percentage of land called musha'a was allocated and utilized in common by a village or community and parceled out to individuals and peasant families. The land was divided into three fields, each then divided into portions equal in quality and conditions, and then further divided into strips distributed to each village household. The allotment of land would be made depending on the number of working animals each household had. Households without animals got stony ground that couldn't be ploughed as they had no means to do so. If they had acquired animals before the next allotment they could then participate. At intervals of one to five years the peasants redistributed the land usually by lot. Thus, a village farmer did not have rights to a single plot of land, but rather the plot of land he cultivated changed every few years. The redistribution process tended to equalize the economic possibilities of each peasant. A peasant allocated a poor plot of land might find himself with a better plot of land with the redistribution and vice versa.

The musha'a system is often criticized as inefficient and hindering agricultural progress. Given the periodic redistribution of land, the peasant had no incentive to improve the land he was cultivating. The opposite view is that no evidence proves that the musha'a system was less efficient than individual land-holdings and that the musha'a system reduced risks to peasant communities and encouraged communal cooperation and responsibility. In the late 19th century, the growing dependence of some farmers on selling to local and foreign markets for agricultural products and encouraged the increase in individual entrepreneurs who operated in a monetary economy rather than the collective and traditional nature of the musha'a. The Ottoman government attempted, without much success, to eliminate the musha'a with its land law of 1858. The Ottomans aimed to increase its revenue from taxation and to exert more control over land. Jewish settlers who wished to buy land in Palestine beginning about 1880 found the musha'a system inconsistent with their preference for clear titles and boundaries to land. The British continued the effort to eliminate musha'a after they overthrew Ottoman rule during World War I.

By the end of the Ottoman period, the small farmers of the musha'a system were impoverished by government policy hostile to the continuation of collective land tenure, higher taxes, indebtedness, and increased pressure on the land due to population growth. Land was increasingly owned by large investors, many of whom were not resident in Palestine.

== Fellaheen agriculture (1840-1914) ==
=== Fellah cultivation methods and crops ===
When the Ottoman rule ended, 75% of land was being used to harvest grains. Often, a two-field system would be used to grow winter crops wheat and barely on one side and summer crops sesame and Indian millet on the other. The next season, the second side would have the winter crop and the first side would be left unsown. The Ottoman government attempted to ban fallowing and repossess the untilled land but were unable to.

During this period farmers also grew dura, beans, fenugreek, chickpeas, olives, grapes, cotton, and oranges with citrus groves making up 3,000 hectares of land in 1910.

The fellah used a light nail plow so that the fields could be plowed sooner after it had rained compared to the use of animal led plows or heavy machinery.

=== 1858 land code ===
The Ottoman government attempted to establish policies to change how land was owned to eventually take more taxes from the fellaheen. They wanted to shift land ownership from collective holding to an individual land-holding system. The Land Code stated that a village could not own land communally and non-cultivated land would belong to the state.

=== 1876 land law ===
This law stated that Mulk land owned by notables that weren't servicing the Sultan would be taken away and put up for sale to Europeans. Baron Rothschild used 10 million pounds sterling on land plots, settlement constructions, establishing plantations and manufacturing plants. He provided Jewish settlers with a minimum income, helping them to become established in the land. Years later in 1897 the World Zionist Organization was established and in 1899 they created the Keren Kayemet fund which encouraged Jewish settlement and the buying of land.

=== Effects of these regulations ===
These changes resulted in Jewish-owned land rising from 25,000 dunums in 1882 to 1.6 millions dunums in 1941. Many of the fellah had to sell the titles to their land and work for the new owners due to an increased tax burden. By around 1900, six Palestinian families owned 23% of all cultivated land and 16,910 families owned just 6%.

== Beginnings of Jewish agriculture ==
The first Jewish agricultural settlements were established in 1882 after purchasing land from Palestinians. Their inhabitants were eastern European Jews who had little knowledge of agriculture and adopted local practices. The first settlements were in danger of failing, but were saved when banker Edmond de Rothschild invested in the settlements, encouraging and financing commercial rather than subsistence agriculture and the adoption of modern European technology. By the year 1900, more than 5,000 Jews were engaged in agriculture and they cultivated 5,500 ha (14,000 acres) of land mostly devoted to grains and vineyards. The settlements were located in the plains near the Mediterranean coast where Palestinian commercial agriculture was also expanding. This was the most fertile area of Palestine. The emphasis was on citrus production for export to Europe. By 1914, near the end of the Ottoman Empire, Jews owned an area of 42,000 ha (100,000 acres) of land, 6.4 percent of cultivated land in Palestine.

== British mandate ==
The dissolution of the Ottoman Empire after World War I led to the League of Nations giving Great Britain a mandate to administer Palestine. The mandate lasted from 1920 to 1948. The mandate "included the incompatible goals" of encouraging settlement of Jews while protecting the rights of the Palestinian Arabs and a small population of European Christians. According to 1922 census, Jews made up 11 percent of the population of 750,000 in the British mandate with Palestinians, both Muslims and Christians, making up almost all of the remainder.

The British conducted surveys and implemented policies to convert land cultivated in common by Palestinian communities into private property. As a consequence, the percentage of land cultivated by Palestinian communities in the musha'a system declined from 70 percent in 1917 to 25 percent in 1940. The mandate period is also characterized by the side-by-side existence of the indigenous agricultural systems of Palestinians and the imported technology of Jewish farmers, the rise of capitalism in the agricultural sector, the rapid increase in the Jewish population due to immigration, and the progress in growing and marketing cash crops by both Jewish and Palestinian farmers.

=== Palestinian Arab agriculture ===
During the mandate period, the typical Palestinian farmer in the highlands continued to practice subsistence farming of wheat, barley, and millet and continued to have problems of too-small holdings, debt, and uncertain tenancy. "They devoted their energies into holding on to what they had." Yields of the grain crops varied greatly from year to year and imports were necessary to make up deficits in the demand for grain for local consumption.

The share of farmland devoted to growing grain declined (as did the musha'a system of land tenancy in favor of privately owned land) as Palestinian agriculture increased in diversity. Palestinian production of export and commercial crops increased rapidly. Vegetables (including potatoes, a new crop), olives, and fruit, especially citrus, were the most important commercial crops. As opposed to grain production in the highlands, most commercial agriculture was on the plains near the Mediterranean Sea and irrigation was commonly used to make up deficits in precipitation. Inland Galilee was an area of increase in growing olives and producing olive oil. During the mandate period, Palestinian vegetable production increased more than ten-fold, olive production more than doubled, and acreage planted in citrus increased more than seven-fold. Citrus comprised about 40 percent of the value of the agricultural exports of the Palestinian Arabs. Despite the rapid increase in Palestinian citrus cultivation, by 1945, the acreage of Jewish-grown citrus had risen to slightly exceed Palestinian acreage. Palestinian vegetable production continued to be almost triple than of Jewish production. The production of wheat, barley, and olives was dominated by Palestinian farmers.

=== Jewish agriculture ===
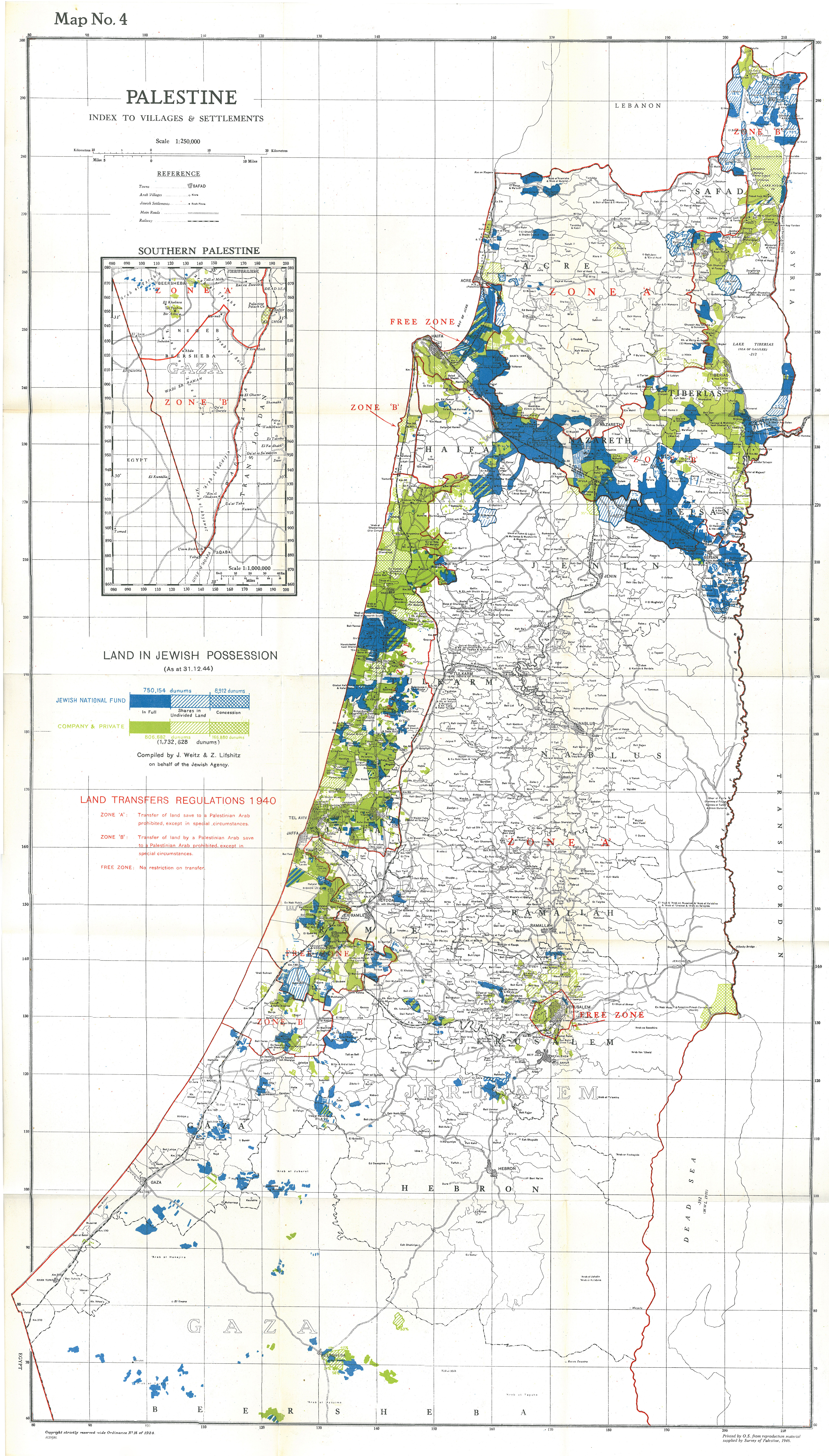
Jewish-owned land (blue and green) in Palestine as of 31 December 1944.

During the mandate period the Jewish population in Palestine increased much more rapidly than the Arab population. In 1918, the population of Palestine consisted of about 60,000 Jews and 630,000 non-Jews. By 1947, the population was 630,000 Jews as compared to 1,324,000 non-Jews. The increase in the Jewish population was mostly due to immigration. Jewish agriculture increased as the Jewish population did. The 6.4 percent of cultivated land owned by Jews in 1914 increased to 24.5 percent (160,480 ha (396,600 acres)) by 1941.

Agriculture and the acquisition of agricultural land served the Zionist objective of creating a Jewish state. The Jews mostly purchased land from large landowners on the plains rather than from the musha'a peasants in the highlands. In 1940, the colonial government banned land sales from Arabs to Jews everywhere except in Jerusalem and portions of the coastal plain and banned even land sales between Jews in the highland regions of Galilee and Judea and Samaria. The first Jewish settlements utilized Palestinian labor, but soon the standard was to employ only Jews on Jewish-owned land even although the cost was higher than when Palestinian labor was used. The Jews claimed that the money they spent for land stimulated the former landowners to invest in modernizing Palestinian agriculture. Charles S. Kamen doubts that view as many land owners were urban dwellers or not residents of Palestine, although some of the money may have been invested in Palestinian citrus plantations. Palestinians claim that the Jewish land purchases displaced many farmers. Kamen estimates that the displacement amounted to between 10,000 and 30,000 Palestinians.

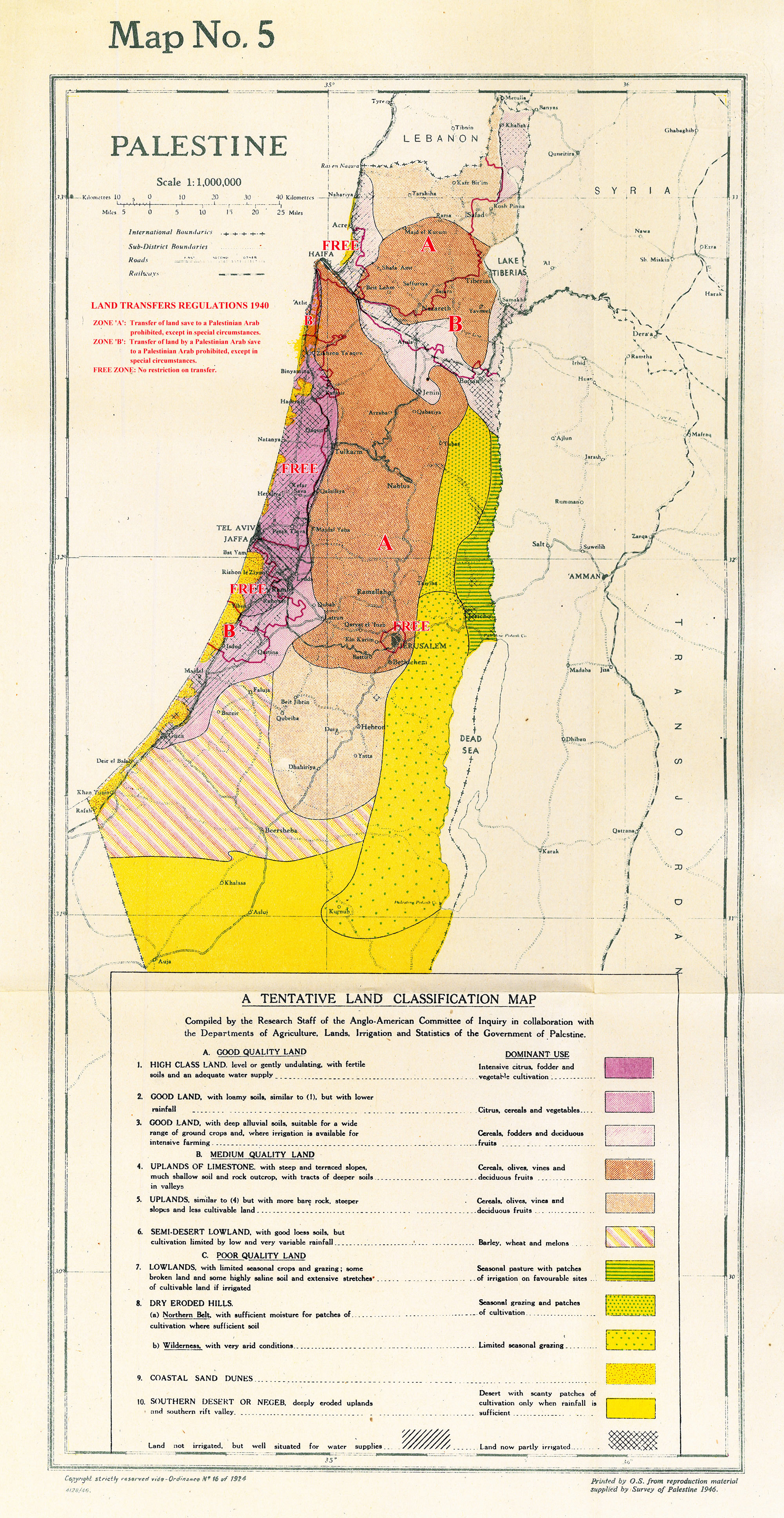
WhitePaper

==== Funding of Zionist labour settlements ====
The acquisition of land by Jewish settlers was possible through funding from the Jewish National Fund, whose capital mostly came from Zionist institutions like the Foundation Fund and Nir. By the end of 1941, 34,440 Jews populated these holdings with 10.7 dunums per person. At the same time an Arab fellah family of 6 owned an average of 30-35 dunams of land. In 1941 the 'labour settlements' were utilizing machinery at a higher level than the fellaheen with 251 tractors and 95 combines as well as lorries and threshing machines; Jewish settlements also invested in concrete buildings while many Arab farmers lived in mud houses. At the end of 1936 the capital of the farms came from Zionist institutions (66%), loans from other institutions (11.7%), and the capital of the settlement itself excluding land given entirely by Zionist institutions (22.3%).

=== Crops (1943) ===
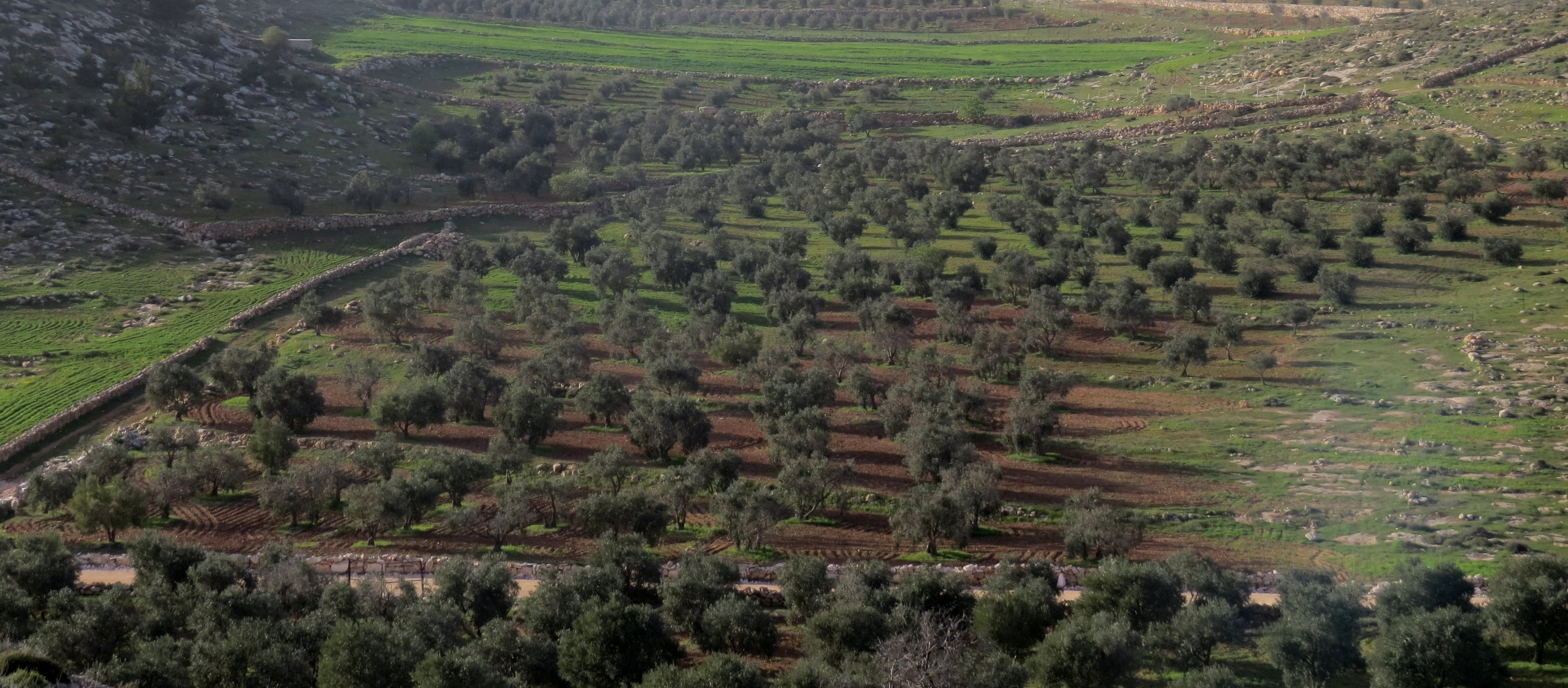
An olive orchard in as-Samu, Palestine (2015)

In 1943, 91.7 percent of crop land was rainfed and 8.3 percent was irrigated. Most of the Jewish land was cultivated in commercial and export crops while most Palestinians continued to practice subsistence farming growing wheat, barley, and olives. The acreage devoted to crops (including both Palestinian and Jewish land) was the following.

Crop	hectares cultivated (acres)	percentage of total acreage
Wheat	133,400 ha (330,000 acres)	30.6%
Barley	118,200 ha (292,000 acres)	27.1%
Orchards and vineyards	83,100 ha (205,000 acres)	19.1%
Vegetables	30,600 ha (76,000 acres)	7.0%
Citrus	26,700 ha (66,000 acres)	6.1%
Other	43,700 ha (108,000 acres)	10.0%
Total	435,700 ha (1,077,000 acres)	100.0%

== Partition and war ==
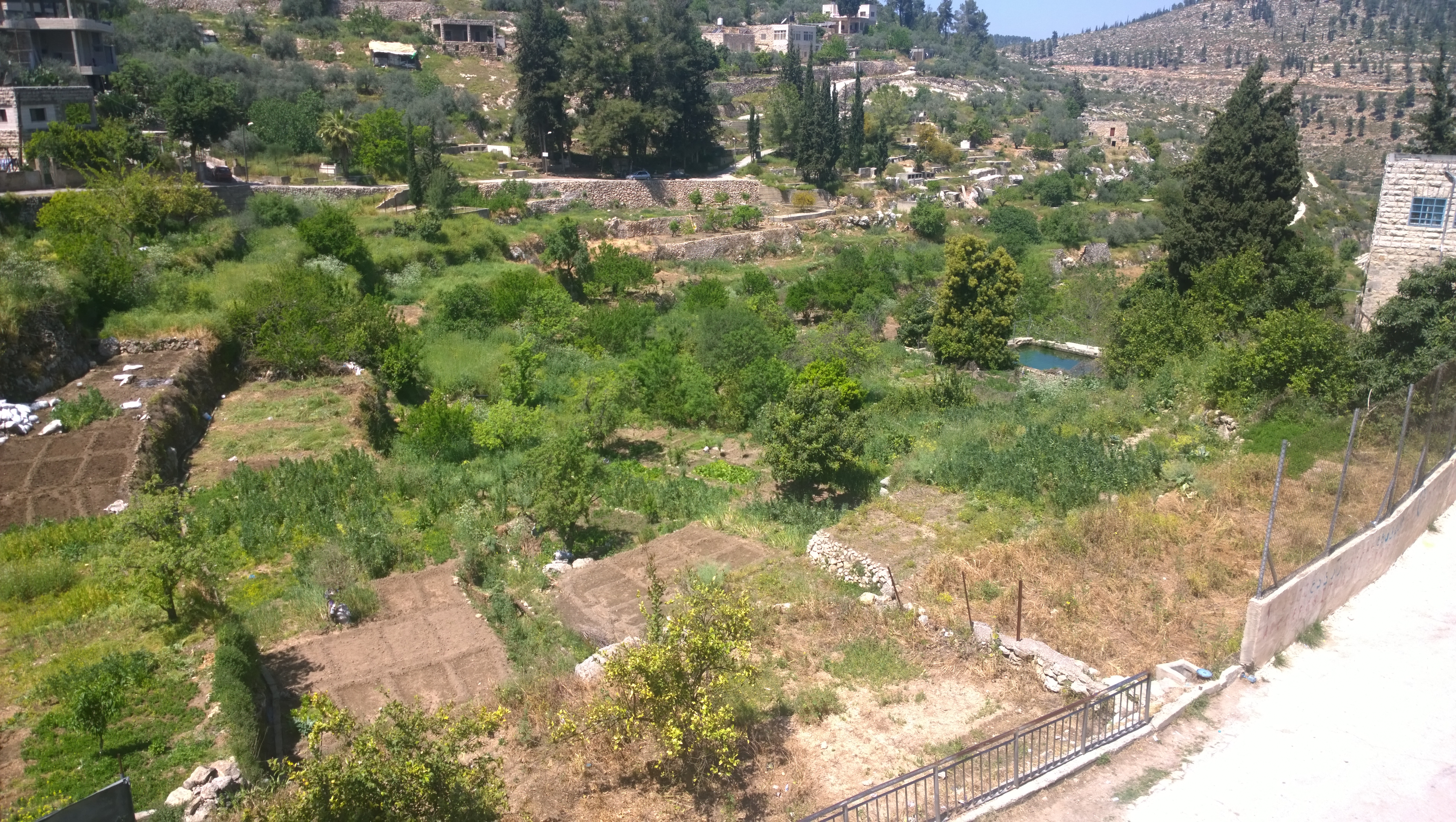
Garden plots and orchards in the State of Palestine in 2016.

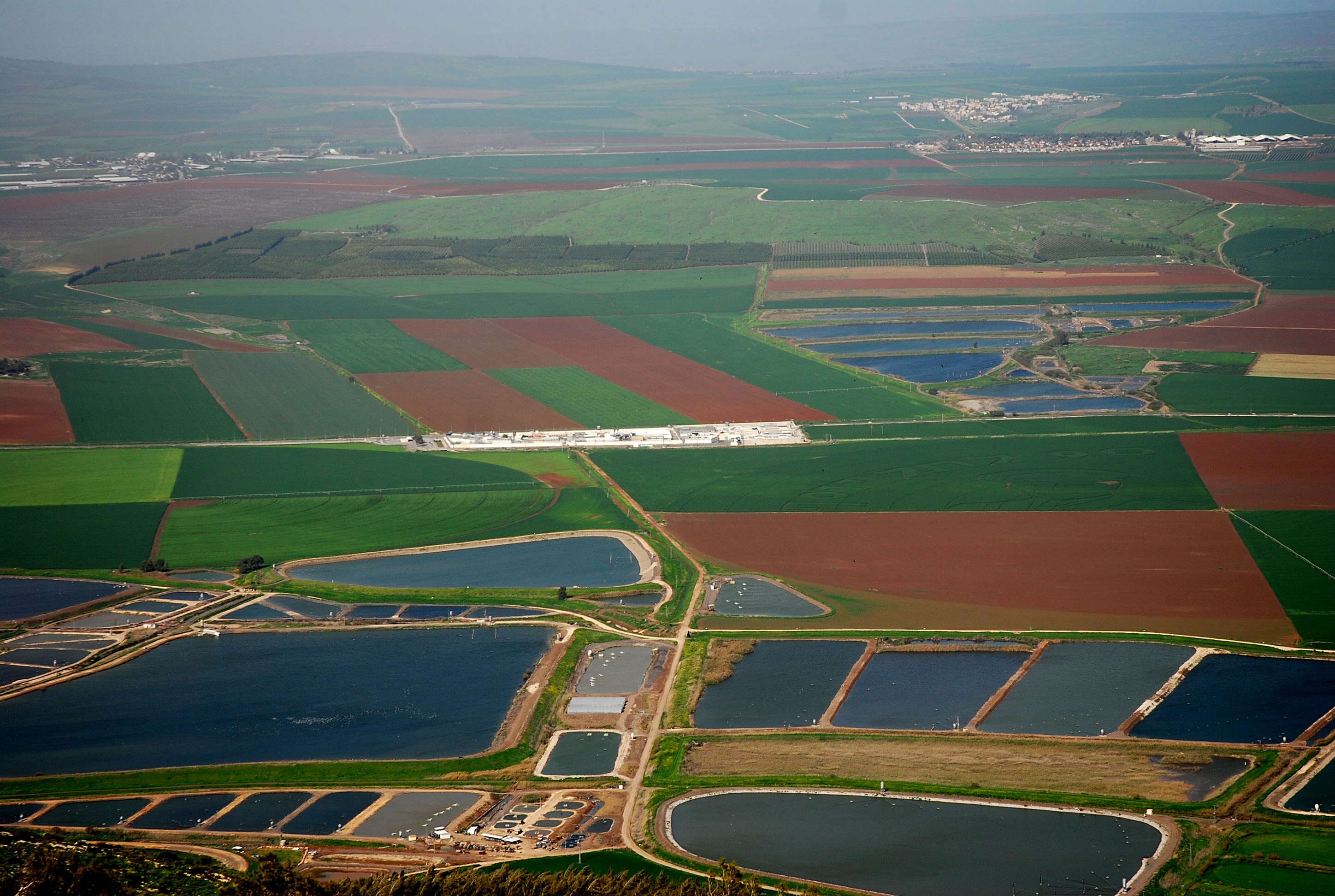
Fields in the Jezreel Valley of Israel in 2010.

The post-World War II civil war in Palestine and the 1948 Arab-Israeli War resulted in the partition of Palestine into the independent state of Israel, inhabited primarily by Jews, and the Palestinian territories, inhabited primarily by Palestinian Arabs. The wars resulted in 700,000 Palestinians (85 percent of the Palestinian population living within the borders of Israel), mostly farmers, being forced off or abandoning their land in what became Israel—and few of them have been able to return. For example, prior to the war about one-half of the commercially-important citrus orchards near the Mediterranean coast were owned by Palestinians. Palestinian and Israeli citrus-growers cooperated as members of a Citrus Board. In 1950, after the Palestinian owners had been expelled from their lands, several prominent Jewish citrus growers requested the Israeli government to allow four Palestinians who had been members of the Citrus Board to return and reclaim their property. The Israeli government turned down the request and the former Palestinian citrus orchards remained in Israeli hands.

The value of the agricultural land of the Palestinians lost to the Israelis was valued in 1996 at between 2.2 and 2.6 billion dollars (1993 dollars), about $5 billion in 2023. Eighty percent of the 2,185,000 dunums (221,000 ha (550,000 acres)) Israel claimed was brought into cultivation after the 1948 war was agricultural land that belonged to and had been cultivated by the Palestinians before their displacement from the land during the war.

This displacement and disruption caused the near disappearance of Palestinian agriculture in Israel and the replacement of Palestinian farmers by Israelis. In the Palestinian territories (and since 1988 the State of Palestine), much farmland has been occupied by Israeli settlers. Concurrently, Israeli policies limiting Palestinian access to land, water, markets, and technology have been detrimental to Palestinian Arab farmers and favorable to Israeli settlers in Palestine, a situation which endures into the 21st century.

== Effects on agriculture from Gaza War (2023-) ==
=== October 7th Attack ===
Gaza's invasion of Israel produced a severe acute agricultural crisis in Israel. Rocket attacks and arson caused extensive damage to agricultural land in the Gaza Envelope, and the devastation and continued rocket fire forced depopulation of the region. More consequentially, the flight of foreign workers, most from Thailand, and the expulsion of Palestinian workers at the start of the war caused a severe agricultural labor shortage. Civilian volunteers from Israel and abroad, mainly Jewish, filled in some of the labor deficit as production of fruits and vegetables declined by 80% in the first few months of the war.

=== War in Gaza ===
On the eve of the war, 32% of land in Gaza was used for agriculture, and agriculture contributed 11% of the territory's GDP and accounted for nearly half of its exports. Damage to farmland in Gaza has been severe, and most fields today lay abandoned with agricultural output insignificant.

During the war, Gaza has relied almost entirely on international aid for food. Even before the war, Gaza was heavily aid dependent, with over 75% of the population reliant on UN food assistance. Gaza experienced an acute malnutrition crisis in 2025 due to a months-long pause in aid deliveries imposed by Israel following the January 2025 ceasefire. An IPC report declared a famine in Gaza in August 2025 due to high levels of acute malnutrition. The finding was highly controversial and contested by supporters of Israel and the Israeli government, who noted that the report found no evidence of mass death, one of the prerequisites for such a declaration. Following resumption of food aid, malnutrition levels reverted to the very low levels found in Gaza before the war, and evidence of mass starvation death never emerged following an October 2025 ceasefire.

== Role of women in agriculture in Palestine ==
=== Ottoman era ===
During the Ottoman period, rural women participated in farming and herding, which were primarily subsistence based. Studies of Sharia court records in the Ottoman Empire have shown that women could own private property and acquire the usufruct (landlord) rights to public agricultural lands, but laws largely favored men in inheritance. Women often used these court systems to dispute inheritance claims to land. These women were part of the middle class. The traditional Masha'a system supported communally owned and managed agricultural lands, as opposed to private or state-owned land. With the increasing participation of late Ottoman Palestine in the global economy, agricultural products as commodities became more common. Women played a role here as well. Olive oil, a key cultural and economic product of Palestine, was used in cooking, in lieu of money, and to make soap. This soap was a massive export both regionally and internationally.

=== British era to present ===
Urban economic growth led many Arab men to work as day laborers in the cities beginning in the British Mandate era, leaving women to take on a greater share of subsistence farming in rural villages. This trend in division of labor continues to today even as agricultural employment declines with economic modernization. In 1970, 57 percent of the total Palestinian female labor force worked in agriculture, compared to just 33% of the male labor force; these figures were 21% and 9%, respectively, in 2014. Land ownership is extremely unequal between the sexes in Palestinian society, with women representing only about 7.2% of agricultural land owners as of 2010. Women's access to agricultural training and education has been limited. Due to resource and mobility restrictions by Israel, the amount of time agricultural practices, largely done by women, take has doubled in some instances. The Al Qarara Baladi Seed Bank set up by Hanadi Muhanna is an example of a woman-led organization Palestinian agricultural organization.
