= Rimal Yibna =

Cultivated area of Palestinian village

Rimāl Yibnā (Arabic: رمال يبنا, lit. "the sands of Yibnā") refers to the dune fields west of the Palestinian village of Yibna, on the southern coastal plain of Ottoman and British Mandate Palestine. The area became the theater for interaction between sedentary villagers, nomadic Bedouin groups, and colonial authorities during the nineteenth and twentieth centuries. The area is considered a key study case of traditional Palestinian dune agriculture.

== Geography ==
Rimāl Yibnā formed the western hinterland of Yibna, bounded by the Mediterranean Sea to the west and the fertile Soreq Valley to the east. To the south it bordered the lands of ʿArab Suqrīr, and to the north the shrine and dunefield of al-Nabi Rubin. Like similar dunefields further south, it consists of Holocene quartz sands blown from the Nile, intermixed with shell fragments. Seasonal interdune depressions sometimes held fresh water near the surface, enabling cultivation in otherwise marginal conditions.

== Historical context ==
The area has been cultivated for dune agriculture since the Early Islamic period using the plot-and-berm irrigation technique.

During the Late Ottoman period, Yibna was one of the most populous villages of the Gaza sub-district, with nearly 300 households recorded in 1871. Bedouin tribes like the Malāliḥa, Rumaylāt, and Sawārika camped seasonally in the dunes, grazing livestock and cultivating small patches of land. Land tenure was shaped by Ottoman land codes that classified dunes as mawāt ("dead land"), formally state-owned but revivable through continuous cultivation.

Before the late nineteenth century, the dune field was largely uncultivated and used mainly for grazing. In 1818, the explorers Charles Leonard Irby and James Mangles noted the dunes of al-Nabi Rubin and Yibna as sandy wastes dotted with brush and nomadic camps. In 1863, the French scholar Victor Guérin described crossing "high dunes, composed of an extremely fine and loose sand" around Nabi Rubin and Yibna, remarking that although they were barren, irrigation could render them suitable for cultivation, as evidenced by scattered clumps of mastic trees (Pistacia lentiscus). Similarly, Conder and Kitchener's memoirs to the Palestine Exploration Fund observed the dunes as marginal land occupied by Bedouin encampments rather than settled agriculture.The British Survey of Western Palestine (1870s) recorded no significant cultivation within the sands.

== Agricultural practices ==
During the late Ottoman and British Mandate periods, Yibna landholders partnered with Bedouin groups to cultivate, guard and improve sandy tracts in Rimāl Yibna. This continued agricultural use turned some Bedouin groups into long-term possessors of dune lands, and encouraged their transition toward a semi-sedentary lifestyle.

Agriculture in the dunes of Yibna was part of Palestinian dune agriculture. Oral testimonies and archival sources describe how villagers and Bedouin cultivated figs, grapevines, and other fruit trees in interdune plots, alongside seasonal crops such as barley, wheat, and melons. Despite the poor sandy soils, cultivation was made possible by exploiting shallow groundwater tables and by enriching the sand with manure and organic matter.

One important practice was mawāṣī (plot-and-berm cultivation), in which cultivators cleared small sunken plots, constructed embankments, and irrigated the soil from shallow wells or natural springs. These gardens were typically planted with vegetables such as cucumbers, spinach, and melons for local consumption and nearby markets.

In addition, villagers established tree plantations (kurūm or bustān), planting figs, olives, mulberries, pomegranates, and grapevines. According to Islamic law, trees were regarded as private property (mulk), even when planted on state land (mīrī). These orchards often marked claims of ownership and were sometimes supported by small irrigation pools and wells.

Interdune depressions were also used for field agriculture (ḥuqūl), where villagers sowed cereals such as barley and wheat. These areas were frequently held in mushāʿ (communal tenure), with members of the village rotating rights of cultivation.

By the early twentieth century, no more than 2–3 percent of the dunefield was under cultivation. The expansion of cultivation accelerated during the 1920s–30s, spurred by Mandate land-tax reforms and the drive to secure landownership during cadastral survey operations. Despite repeated failures due to dune encroachment, neglect, or overgrazing, by the 1940s villagers and Bedouin collectively cultivated up to 10–17% of Rimāl Yibnā.

== British Mandate period ==
Under the Mandate, Rimāl Yibnā was administered as part of the Ramla sub-district, while Nabi Rubin's lands were managed as a waqf by the Supreme Muslim Council. Land settlement hearings in the 1930s–40s registered hundreds of claims, though colonial officials frequently dismissed cultivation as insufficient, classifying much of the area as government property. Nevertheless, the people of Yibna became leading cultivators in the district, maintaining extensive citrus groves and more than 11,000 dunams of tree plantations by the 1940s, among the largest in Palestine.

== Decline and legacy ==
Dune agriculture at Rimāl Yibnā was inherently unstable. Many plots reverted to sand after neglect or encroachment, yet the surviving fruit trees and orchards testify to the scale of adaptation attempted before 1948. By the time of the depopulation of Yibna and neighboring villages, Rimāl Yibnā had become one of the most developed examples of dune cultivation in southern Palestine.

== See also ==
- Palestinian dune agriculture
- Yibna
- Nabi Rubin
- Ashdod-Yam
