= Palestinian dune agriculture =

Traditional Palestinian cultivation system in sandy dunefields

- Regions: Palestine, southern coastal plain (from Sinai to Yibna)
- Period: Early Islamic period – 1948
- Types: Interdune sunken gardens (mawāṣī), orchards (kurūm), field crops (ḥuqūl)
- Crops: figs, grapes, olives, sycamore-figs, melons, cucumbers, tomatoes, cereals
- Status: Largely disappeared after 1948

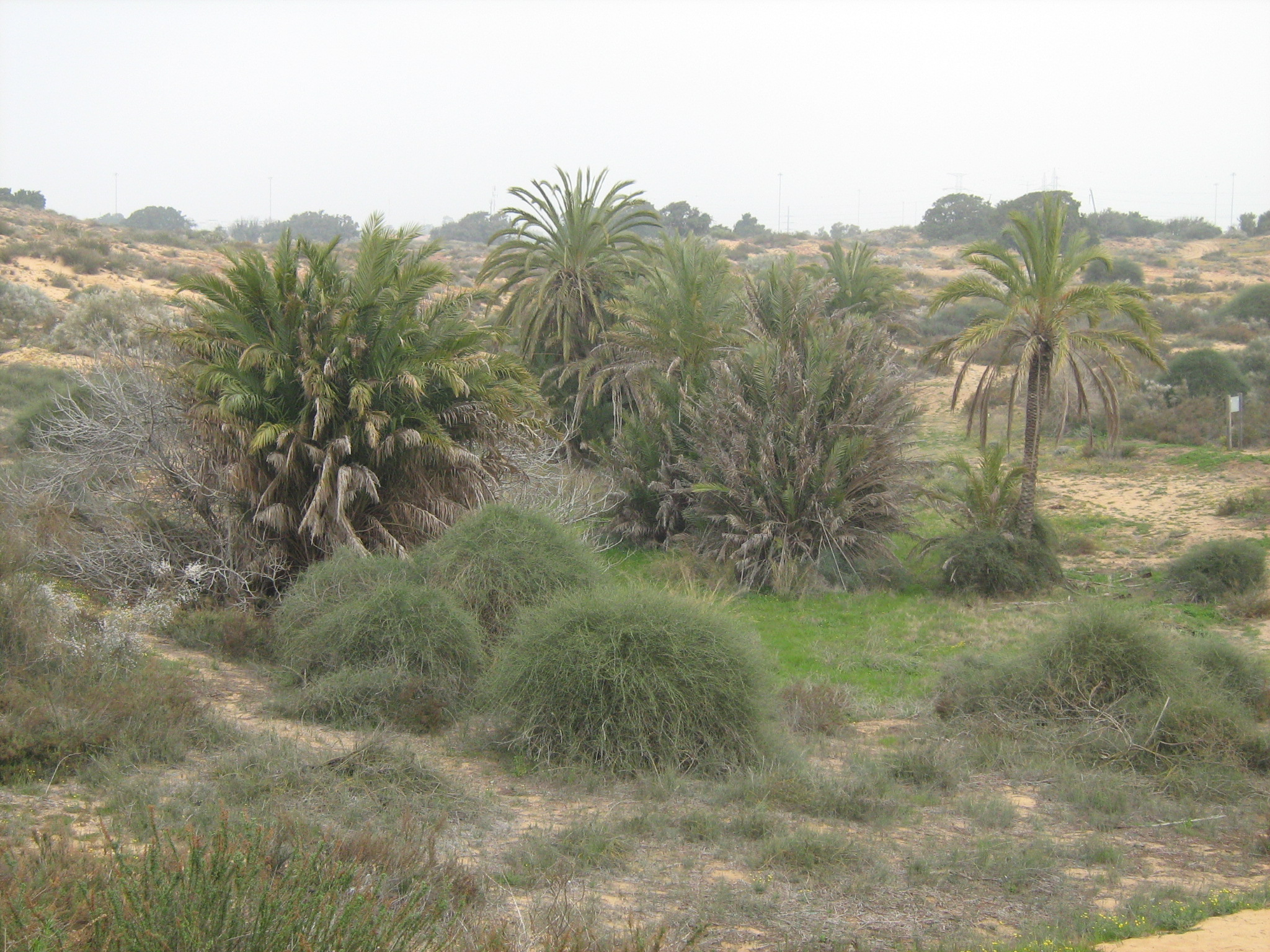
Palestinian dune agriculture in Rimal Isdud

Palestinian dune agriculture (Arabic: الزراعة الفلسطينية في الرمال) comprises the traditional methods of cultivating the dunefields (rimāl) of the southern Levant along the coastal plain of Palestine from Sinai to Yibna. These techniques, locally known as mawāṣī (مواصي), helped to transform marginal sandy environments into productive gardens and orchards. Revived during the Late Ottoman and British Mandate periods, cultivated dunefields provided subsistence crops, fruit, and vegetables for the neighboring villages, while also integrating them into regional markets.

== Historical background ==
The practice of interdune cultivation in Palestine originated during the Early Islamic period (8th–11th centuries CE). Excavations near Caesarea revealed a distinctive plot-and-berm agroecosystem, constructed by farmers who excavated shallow plots into the dunes and surrounded them with raised berms that acted. These berms intercepted rainfall runoff and rising groundwater, while the depressed plots created a moist microenvironment to support vines, vegetables, and fruit trees. In the Rimal Yibna dunefield, a similar inter-settlement complex of intersecting berms and pits existed, which archaeologists suggested that neighboring communities cultivated together.

The berms were often filled with refuse, ash, and building debris, enriching the sterile sands with organic material and creating what is professionally termed "anthropogenic soils". Botanical remains, including seeds and pollen, indicate cultivation of vegetables, cereals, and orchard crops in line with the moisture regime of the plots. Optically stimulated luminescence (OSL) dating and ceramic finds place the expansion of these systems the late Abbasid and early Fatimid periods.

The plot-and-berm fields had gone through phases of expansion and decline. Initial dune stabilization and intensive cultivation were often followed by gradual abandonment, likely due to hydrological changes, climatic variability, or socio-political disruptions. By the 19th century, migration from Egypt and demographic growth in villages such as Isdud (modern Ashdod) and Ḥamāma encouraged renewed exploitation of sandy soils. British Mandate cadastral records and aerial surveys document extensive planting of vines, figs, sycamores, olives, and vegetables in interdune depressions between the 1920s and 1940s.

== Techniques ==
The characteristic method was mawāṣī (also transcribed mawasi): farmers excavated shallow plots into the sand until reaching clayey layers above the groundwater table, bordered them with berms to resist drifting sand, fertilized with animal dung or household refuse, and irrigated from shallow wells or natural seepage springs (nazzāzāt). Oral traditions describe the initial clearing as jaldihā ("stripping the land"). Crops included tomatoes, cucumbers, melons and seasonal vegetables, alongside fruit trees. Seasonal huts (akhsās) were often used for summer residence near the plots.

== Regional examples ==
- Rimāl Isdūd (Ashdod-Yam): Between the 1920s and 1940s, grid-like vineyards and fig orchards were planted in dunes west of Isdud.
- Rimāl Yibnā (near modern Yavne): Villagers of Yibnā and al-Nabī Rūbīn cultivated interdune patches, balancing improvement with constant sand encroachment..
- Hamama: Between Isdud and al-Majdal, extensive mawāṣī gardens developed near Wādī al-ʾAbṭaḥ, with high levels of cultivation along thee dune margins by the 1930s.
- Al-Mawasi, in the Gaza Strip.

== Social and economic role ==
Dune agriculture underpinned subsistence and market integration. Produce from the rimāl was sold in Isdud, al-Majdal, and Gaza markets. During the Mandate, demand from Allied camps and urban centers boosted profitability. Investment in artesian wells and roads further expanded output in villages such as Ḥamāma. Scholarship argues that these practices challenge colonial-era portrayals of dunefields as barren wastelands, highlighting indigenous environmental knowledge and dynamic adaptation to marginal landscapes.

== Legacy ==
Most dune agricultural landscapes were disrupted or erased following the Nakba (1948) and subsequent afforestation and urban development programs. Nonetheless, surviving vines, figs, and sycamore-figs among the dunes testify to their agricultural utalisation.
