= Ashdod Sand Dune =

Coastal sand-dune ecosystem near Ashdod, Israel

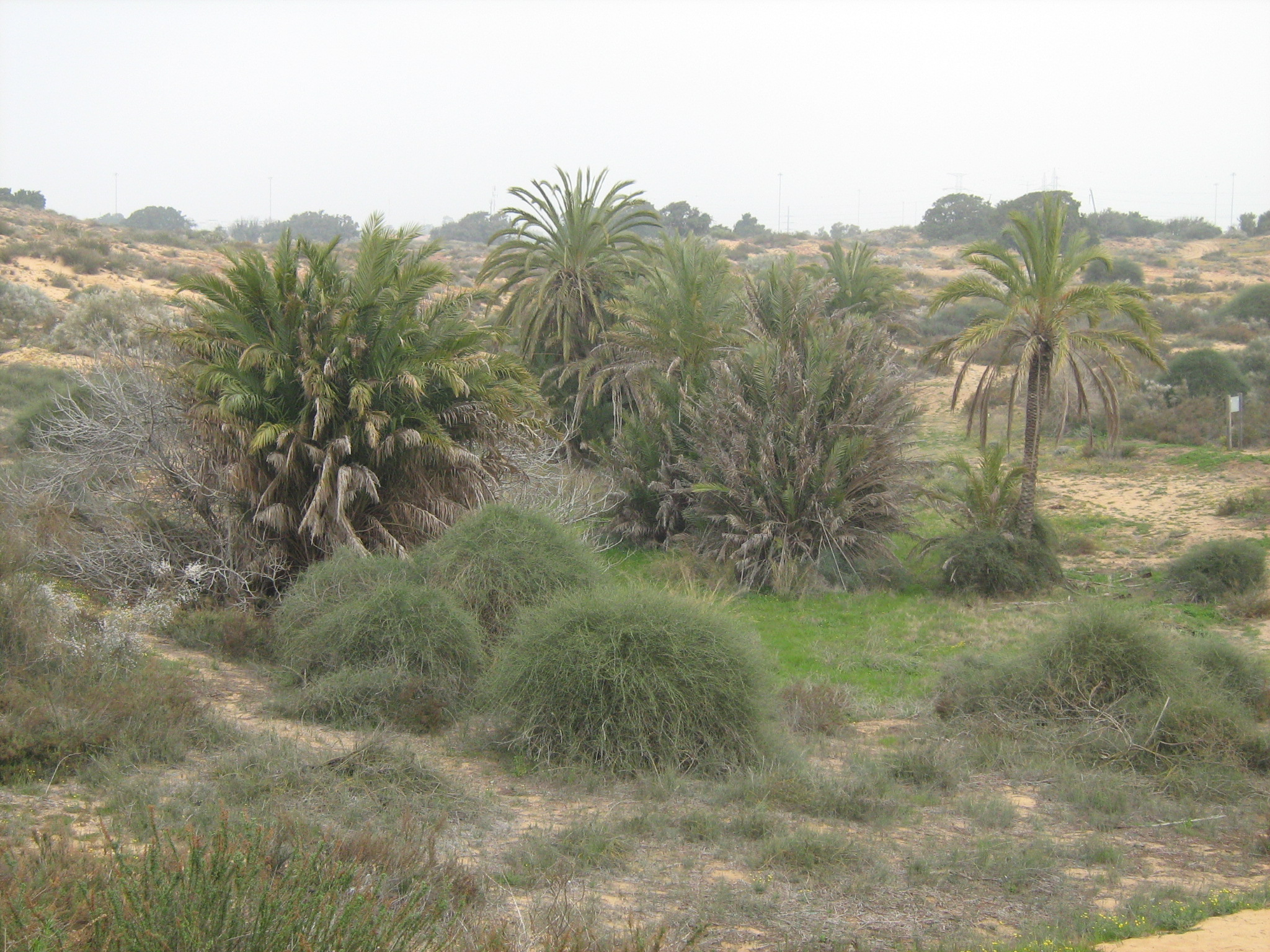

- Location within Ashkelon region of Israel Location within Israel
- Location: Ashdod, Israel
- Coordinates: 31.761852°N 34.615259°E

Ashdod Sand Dune (Hebrew: חולות אשדוד; Arabic: رمال اسدود, romanized: Rimāl Isdūd) is a psammosere ecosystem near the city of Ashdod, on the Israeli Coastal Plain along the Mediterranean Sea, south of Tel Aviv.

The dunes form part of the coastal sand-dune system extending between Ashdod and Ashkelon. The area contains shifting and semi-stabilised dunes, vegetation, wildlife habitats and archaeological remains. Parts of the landscape were cultivated during the late Ottoman and British Mandate periods, while the remaining dunes have been the subject of conservation initiatives and urban development proposals.

== Background ==
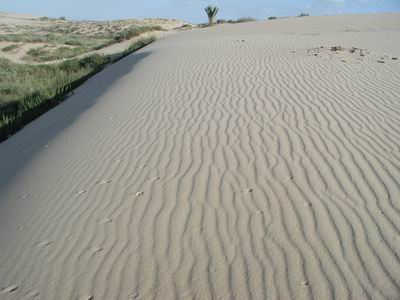
Sand dunes in the Ashdod area

Coastal sand dunes formerly covered an estimated 462 square kilometres (178 sq mi) of Israel's Mediterranean coastline, more than three-quarters of which lay south of Tel Aviv. Urbanisation, industrial development, infrastructure construction and other land-use changes have substantially reduced the extent of the original dune landscapes.

One of the largest surviving concentrations of coastal dunes is located between Ashdod and Ashkelon. This landscape retains areas of mobile sand, associated plant and animal communities, and archaeological evidence of earlier settlement and land use.

The dunes are important for their ecological, geological and cultural characteristics. They provide habitats for species adapted to sandy environments and offer opportunities for scientific research, environmental education and public recreation.

The remaining dune landscapes also form open spaces between expanding urban areas. Their preservation has therefore become an important consideration in regional land-use planning.

=== Sand/dune agriculture in Rimāl Isdūd ===
Rimāl Isdūd (Arabic: رِمَال إِسْدُود, lit. 'The Sands of Isdūd') refers to the coastal dunefields west of the historical village of Isdud, in the area surrounding Ashdod-Yam.

During much of the nineteenth century, these dunes were used primarily for grazing, while agricultural cultivation was concentrated on the more fertile plains and eastern margins of the dunefields.

Historical maps and other records indicate that orchards and cultivated land existed around the margins of Rimāl Isdūd during the late Ottoman period. However, the central dunes remained largely uncultivated until agricultural expansion during the late Ottoman and British Mandate periods, particularly between the 1920s and 1940s.

==== Agricultural development and methods ====
Farmers from Isdud and neighbouring communities developed agricultural plots within the dunes, taking advantage of exposed soil and the relatively shallow groundwater table.

A 2025 study by Roy Marom and Alexander Fantalkin documents several forms of Palestinian dune agriculture used in the area, including:

- Mawāsī: sunken agricultural plots formed by removing surface sand to reach cultivable soil and shallow groundwater, sometimes protected by surrounding embankments.
- Kurūm and basātīn: vineyards, orchards and other plots planted with perennial crops.
- Huqūl: arable fields cultivated in suitable areas between the dunes, including land used for cereal production.

These practices formed part of wider agricultural traditions in the southern coastal plain. Similar methods were documented in the Ashkelon region, where farmers cultivated exposed ground between dunes while attempting to prevent moving sand from covering their crops.

Agricultural expansion was influenced by demographic changes, increasing demand for produce, improvements in transport and the development of agricultural infrastructure during the late Ottoman and British Mandate periods.

During the British Mandate, additional areas of the dunes were converted into cultivated plots. By the 1930s and 1940s, vineyards, fig plantations and other agricultural fields occupied portions of Rimāl Isdūd. Historical maps, aerial photographs and administrative records document the extent of this cultivation.

==== Dune stabilisation and land administration ====
Agricultural development took place alongside efforts by the British Mandatory authorities to control the movement of coastal sand.

Advancing dunes threatened both cultivated land and infrastructure, including the Al-Qantara–Lydda railway. Sand repeatedly accumulated along sections of the railway, requiring removal to maintain operations.

British authorities also undertook dune-stabilisation measures, including afforestation and the planting of vegetation intended to restrict sand movement.

During the 1930s, continued stabilisation work reduced the threat of sand encroachment in certain areas and enabled additional land east of the railway to be cultivated with figs and vines.

Land ownership and cultivation rights were nevertheless subjects of administrative disagreement.

British authorities classified substantial portions of the dunes as government land, including areas cultivated by local inhabitants. Land settlement records examined by Marom and Fantalkin document competing claims concerning the status of cultivated plots.

The records include discussions of proposed leases to existing cultivators, government ownership claims and individual claims based on earlier agricultural use.

Administrative decisions were not uniform. In a documented case from 1943, a British land settlement officer recognised an inherited property claim after examining evidence of established cultivation and surviving fruit trees.

Marom and Fantalkin interpret these records as evidence of tensions between local cultivation practices and British land administration. Their research also documents the contribution of government dune-stabilisation measures to the protection and expansion of agricultural land.

==== Environmental and archaeological effects ====
The expansion of agriculture altered the landscape of Rimāl Isdūd, replacing some areas of sandy vegetation with cultivated fields, vineyards and orchards.

These changes were neither uniform nor necessarily permanent. Shifting sand continued to threaten cultivated land, requiring ongoing maintenance and reclamation work.

Research into the southern coastal plain has documented instances in which advancing dunes buried orchards and fields, while farmers maintained small cultivated plots within depressions between the dunes.

Agricultural expansion also affected archaeological remains at Ashdod-Yam. Vegetation clearance, erosion, cultivation and the reuse of building materials contributed to disturbances at parts of the archaeological site.

Archaeological investigations, historical aerial photographs and botanical evidence have subsequently helped researchers reconstruct agricultural activity in the area.

A 2025 study by Motti Zohar, Yuval Ben-Bassat and Guy Bar-Oz examined the historical development of horticulture across the wider southern coastal plain, identifying evidence of agricultural expansion and the survival of heritage fruit-tree varieties.

== Geography ==
The dunes are part of a belt of Holocene coastal aeolian dunefields extending along the Eastern Mediterranean.

The landscape is bounded by the Mediterranean Sea to the west and fertile alluvial plains to the east. It includes semi-consolidated dunes, kurkar ridges, interdune depressions and areas of exposed soil.

The relatively shallow groundwater table in some depressions, together with seasonal pools and local variations in soil composition, historically allowed cultivation in areas otherwise dominated by sand.

The movement and accumulation of sand have repeatedly modified the local landscape. Coastal winds transport sand inland, while vegetation and topographical features influence the formation and stability of individual dunes.

The surviving dunefields between Ashdod and Ashkelon include mobile dunes and associated habitats that have become increasingly fragmented as urban and industrial development has expanded along the coast.

== Proposed Sand Dune Park ==
=== Conservation initiatives ===
The Society for the Protection of Nature in Israel (SPNI) has campaigned for the establishment of a Sand Dune Park to protect the remaining landscape for scientific research, environmental education, hiking and public recreation.

The original park proposal covered approximately 11 square kilometres between the Mediterranean Sea to the west and agricultural areas to the east, extending from the city of Ashdod in the north to the Avtach waterway in the south.

The proposed park encompassed land within three municipal jurisdictions:

- The northern section, within the municipality of Ashdod.
- The central section, within the Be'er Tuvia Regional Council.
- The southern section, within the Hof Ashkelon Regional Council.

The three authorities had considered various development proposals affecting parts of the dunefields, including residential construction and transport infrastructure.

Other historical proposals and potential uses identified in conservation discussions included:

- Tourism development, including proposals for coastal hotels and resort facilities.
- Sand extraction by the Israel Lands Authority.
- Military training activities associated with the Israel Defense Forces.
- Construction of a nuclear power station in the Nitzanim area.

These proposals reflected competing demands for land during the development of the southern coastal plain. They should not necessarily be understood as projects that remained active in later years.

Until the early 1980s, part of the area was considered for a nuclear power plant. Engineering-geological investigations of the proposed Nitzanim site were published in 1981.

The power plant was never constructed. The period during which the site was reserved for the project delayed other forms of development, contributing to the survival of portions of the dune landscape.

Following the cancellation of the nuclear power project, conservation organisations sought to preserve the area against competing development proposals.

=== Environmental education and planning ===
In 1983, SPNI established the Shiqmim (Shikmim) Field School at Nitzanim to encourage public awareness and appreciation of the region's natural environment.

The school occupied a historic building formerly used by the original settlers of Nitzanim.

SPNI also initiated a survey to identify and map the area's ecological and landscape features.

On the basis of this work, SPNI, in cooperation with the Jewish National Fund (JNF), developed a conceptual plan for the Sand Dune Park.

In 2015, the Israel Nature and Parks Authority and the Jewish National Fund submitted a proposal for a nature reserve encompassing the Ashdod dunes and associated sycamore-tree landscape.

The proposal subsequently encountered delays in the regional planning process. In 2022, Ynet reported that it had remained under consideration for seven years, with disagreements concerning the potential effects of a nature reserve on future urban development.

=== Urban development proposals ===
The expansion of Ashdod has generated competing demands for residential construction, infrastructure and the conservation of the remaining coastal dunes.

In 2021, Ashdod municipal planning authorities advanced proposals for residential development in the southern part of the city. Contemporary reporting described plans for approximately 6,600 housing units, alongside a decision not to proceed with a nature-reserve proposal at that stage.

Subsequent planning discussions considered alternative development boundaries and the designation of protected areas.

In September 2025, a proposal for Ashdod's southern districts included approximately 8,000 residential units together with measures intended to preserve part of the dune landscape.

The proposal included a nature reserve of approximately 2,500 dunams, together with additional woodland and public open space.

In October 2025, the Southern District Planning and Building Committee required an environmental impact assessment for the proposed southern-district development.

The assessment was intended to examine the environmental effects of construction, alternative planning boundaries and the proposed relocation of the Elta industrial facility.

The committee's decision formed part of the ongoing planning process and did not constitute final approval of the residential development or formal declaration of the proposed nature reserve.

== See also ==
- Ashdod-Yam
- Nitzanim
- Nitzanim Nature Reserve
- Palestinian dune agriculture
