= Nabi Rubin =

al-Nabi Rubin النبي روبين al-Nebi Rubin
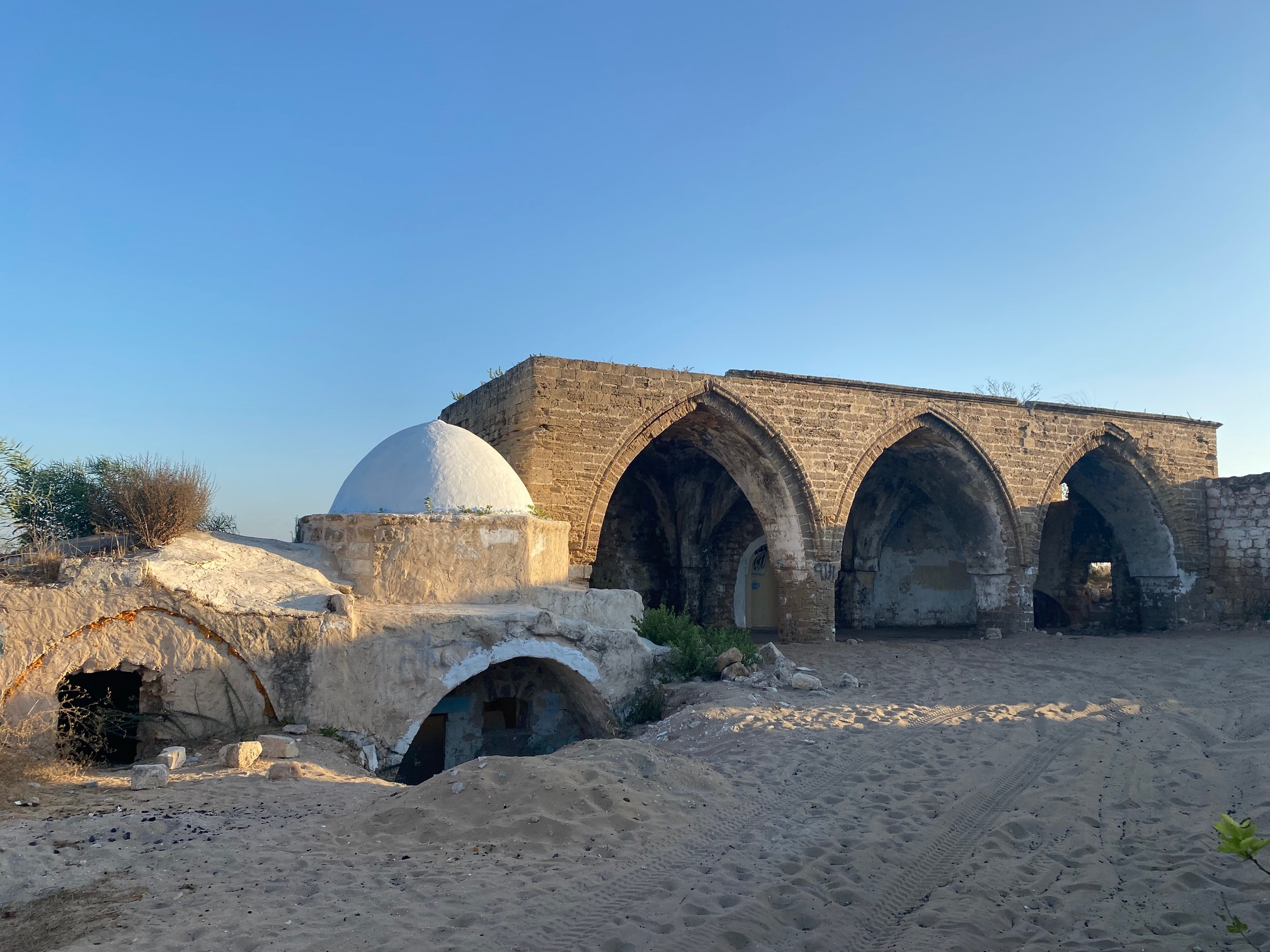
- The shrine of Nabi Rubin in 2021
- Etymology: "The Prophet Reuben"
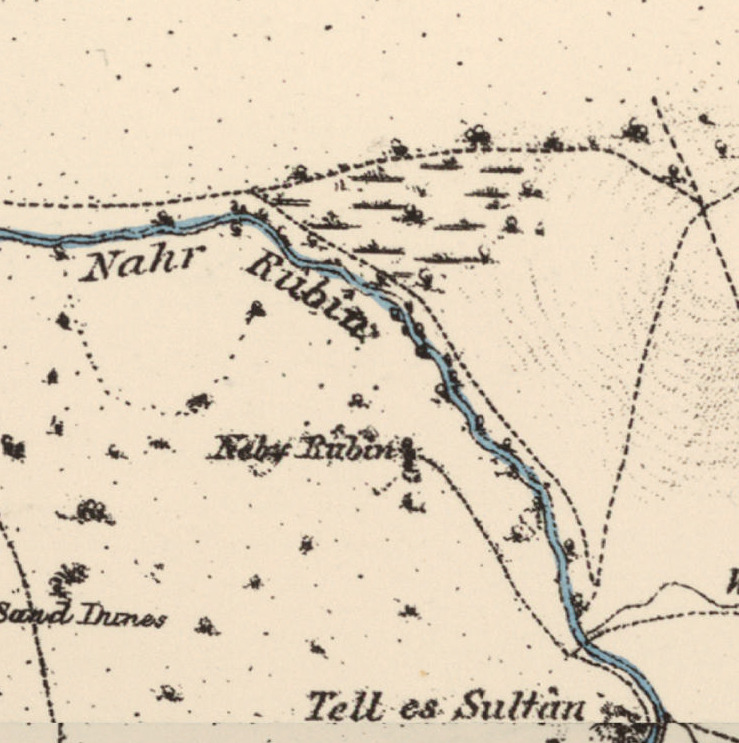
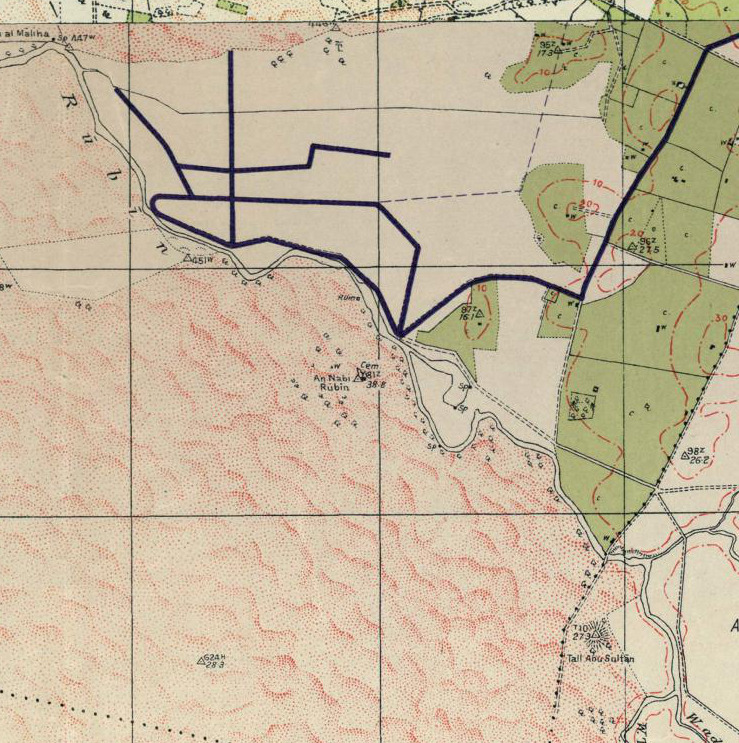
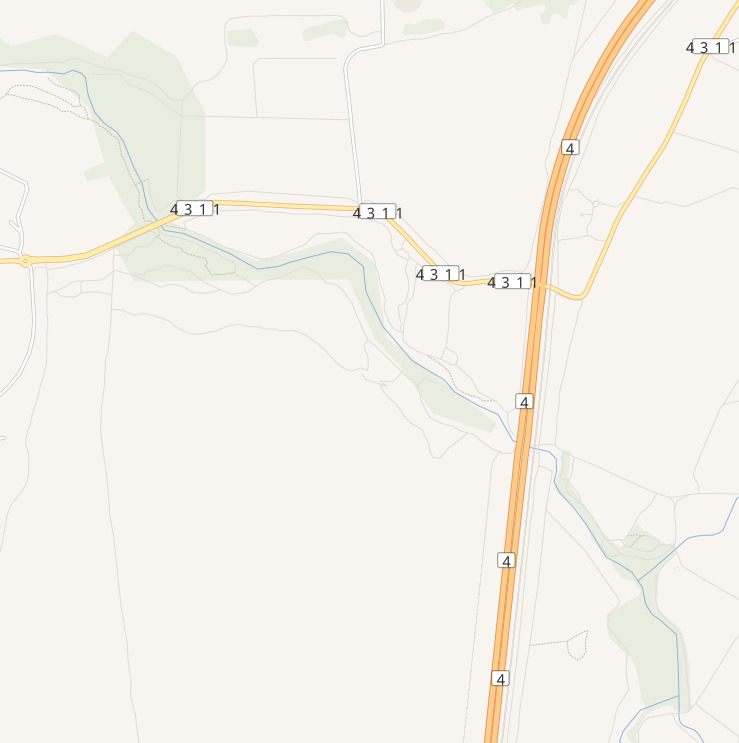
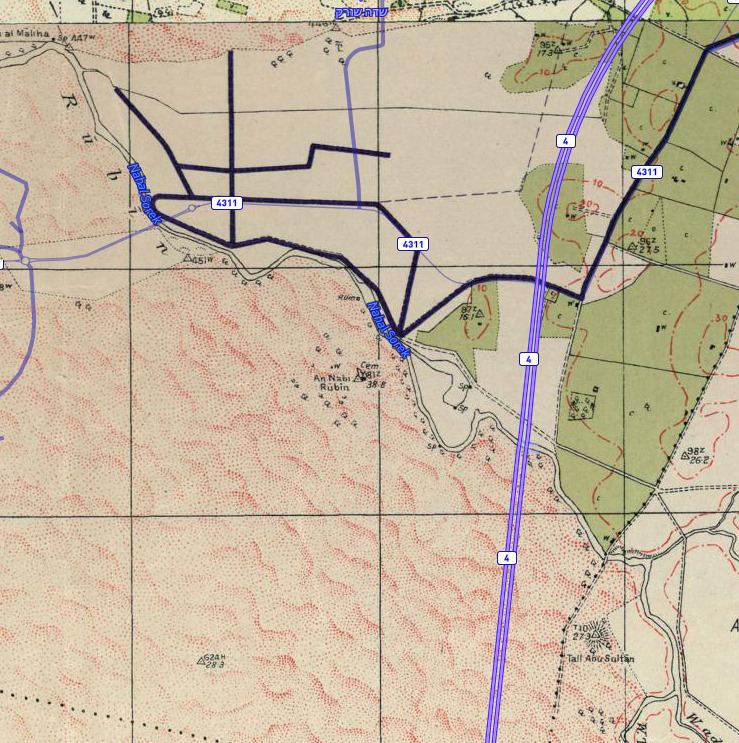
- 1870s map 1940s map modern map 1940s with modern overlay map A series of historical maps of the area around Nabi Rubin (click the buttons)

- Location within Mandatory Palestine
- Coordinates: 31°55′46″N 34°44′02″E
- Palestine grid: 124/148
- Geopolitical entity: Mandatory Palestine
- Subdistrict: Ramle
- Date of depopulation: June 1, 1948

Area
  - Total: 31,002 dunams (31.002 km^{2}; 11.970 sq mi)

Population (1945)
  - Total: 1,420
- Cause(s) of depopulation: Expulsion by Yishuv forces
- Current Localities: Palmachim, Gan Sorek

Nabi Rubin (from Arabic: النبي روبين, romanized: an-Nabī Rūbīn) was a town depopulated during the 1947–1949 Palestine war in Palestine, now Israel, located 14.5 kilometers (9.0 mi) west of Ramla, just northeast of Yibna, and 18 kilometers (11 mi) south of Jaffa. The village was situated on the southern banks of the Nahal Sorek/Wadi al-Sarar at an elevation of 25 meters (82 ft) above sea level.

Nabi Rubin is named after a maqam (shrine) in the village, believed by Muslims to be the tomb of biblical Reuben, first son of Jacob. A Bedouin village of the Malalkha tribe, it evolved into a permanent settlement in the early 20th century. It was captured by the Israel Defense Forces during the 1948 Arab-Israeli War, and the inhabitants were expelled.

== Name ==
The Arabic name, means "the prophet Rubin", with Rubin being the Arabic form of the Biblical Hebrew name Re'uven or Re'uben.

== History ==
Walid Khalidi writes that it is believed that the shrine for al-Nabi Rubin was built in the same place where a Canaanite temple had once stood, and that the mawsim ("religious festival") itself was pagan in origin.

=== Crusader period ===
Nabi Rubin was a place of trade between Crusaders and Muslims before it being inhabited. In 1184, it held a fair where Arab merchants from Damascus traded slaves, Persian and Kurdish-bred horses, weapons, and blades from Yemen and India, with Christians from Acre. This trade continued until wars between the Mamluks and Crusaders commenced in the 13th century.

=== Mamluk period ===
The Nabi Rubin mawsim was one of two prominent mawsims for Biblical prophets in Palestine—the other being dedicated to Nabi Musa "the prophet Moses" near Jericho.

The site comprised a mosque, a minaret, (now demolished), and a maqam (shrine), as well as at least nine wells dispersed in the sand dunes nearby. The oldest part of the present structure is the maqam, which, according to an inscription, was built under the orders of a Mamluk governor of Gaza, Timraz al-Mu'ayyadi, between 1436 and 1437.

The qadi Mujir al-Din wrote in 1495 it "is a tomb of our Reuben," thereon crystallizing in local Muslim tradition that the site is the burial place of Reuben, son of Jacob and Leah. Despite popular belief, the tomb may possibly be that of an Arab sheikh. Mujir ad-Din noted it was a place of pilgrimage.

=== Ottoman period ===
Naby Rubin was not mentioned in 16th century records.

A cross-vaulted room to the east was built slightly later, possibly in the 16th century. The rest of the complex was built in the later Ottoman period, probably in the 19th century. Since at least the 17th century, Muslims from Jaffa, Ramla, Lydda, and the towns and villages surrounding these cities, flocked to Nabi Rubin to celebrate the mawsim.

During the Ottoman period, it was inhabited by the Bedouin tribe of 'Arab al-Sawarika (عرب السواركة). These nomadic people, who inhabited the sand dunes, depended on livestock, transportation, and basic agriculture for survival. Due to their transient lifestyle and modest material possessions, their presence has left only faint marks in the archaeological record.

In 1816, an English traveler, Charles Leonard Irby, visited "Sheik Rubin's tomb, surrounded by a square wall, inclosing some trees". He also describes that [local] people paid vows at the shrine and celebrated festivals there.

In 1863, Victor Guérin noted: "A square compound wall encloses a courtyard planted with about ten old mulberries, which form, in this desert and sandy place, a kind of small oasis. Cisterns provide water for those who come to venerate the memory of Neby Roubin. This person, according to a Moslem tradition, was none other than the patriarch Reuben, the eldest of the twelve sons of Jacob. It rests at the bottom of the courtyard under a cupola which rises above a large sarcophagus covered with a carpet. Another tradition, on the contrary, is that this pretended prophet is simply a sheikh who lived in the course of the last century. At any rate, at the feast of Neby Roubin, a crowd of Muslims hastened on pilgrimage to this place, and this solitary koubbeh becomes the rendezvous of a multitude of more or less considerable pious visitors."

In the late nineteenth century, the lands surrounding the Nabi Rubin shrine were endowed as a waqf by the Shāhīn family. Bedouin and fellahin were brought to cultivate the sandy plots, introducing orchards and vegetable gardens (mawāṣī) that relied on shallow groundwater. The mawāṣī (seasonally cultivated plots) were concentrated west of the shrine, near the Mediterranean shoreline, in an area locally known as al-Ḥilwa. The name is linked to a freshwater spring called ʿAyn al-Ḥilwa, which provided the site with abundant groundwater close to the surface. Contemporary descriptions indicate that this was a low-lying interdune depression, likely situated in the trough between aeolianite ridges, where winter rainfall caused groundwater to emerge and allowed for agricultural use.

The village of Nabi Rubin was first settled by members of the Abu Sawayrih tribe who are descendants of the al-Maliha Bedouin tribe who used dwell in the Sinai Peninsula.

An Ottoman village list of about 1870 showed that Nabi Rubin had 44 houses and a population of 109, whereby the population count included only men. It also noted that there was a tomb there, and that it was a pilgrimage site.

However, when Clermont-Ganneau visited in 1873–4, he found the place "utterly deserted." In 1881, he had "the good fortune" to be present at the festival, and observed "the very curious ceremonies connected to them."

=== British Mandate ===
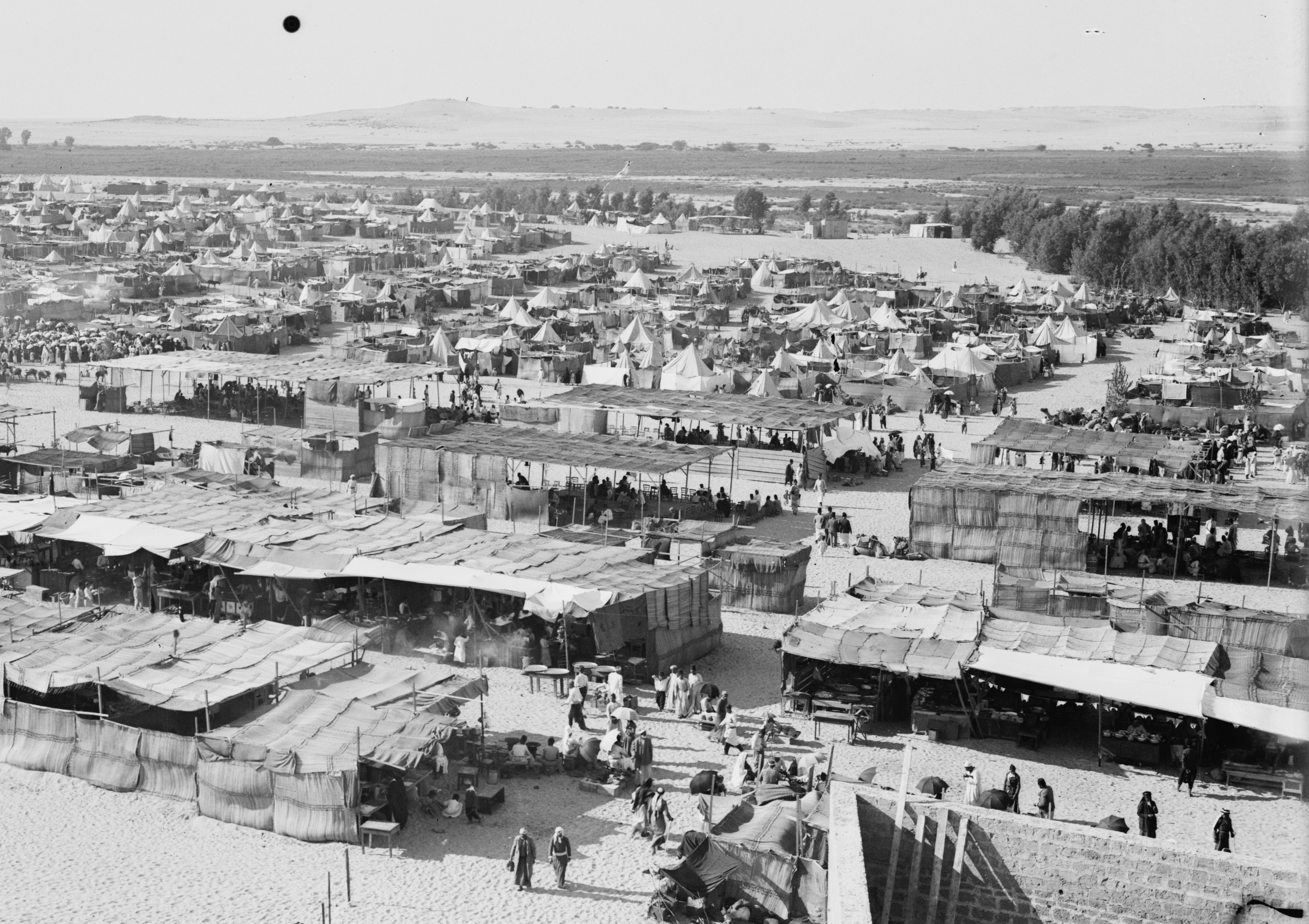
Pilgrim encampments in Nabi Rubin, 1920

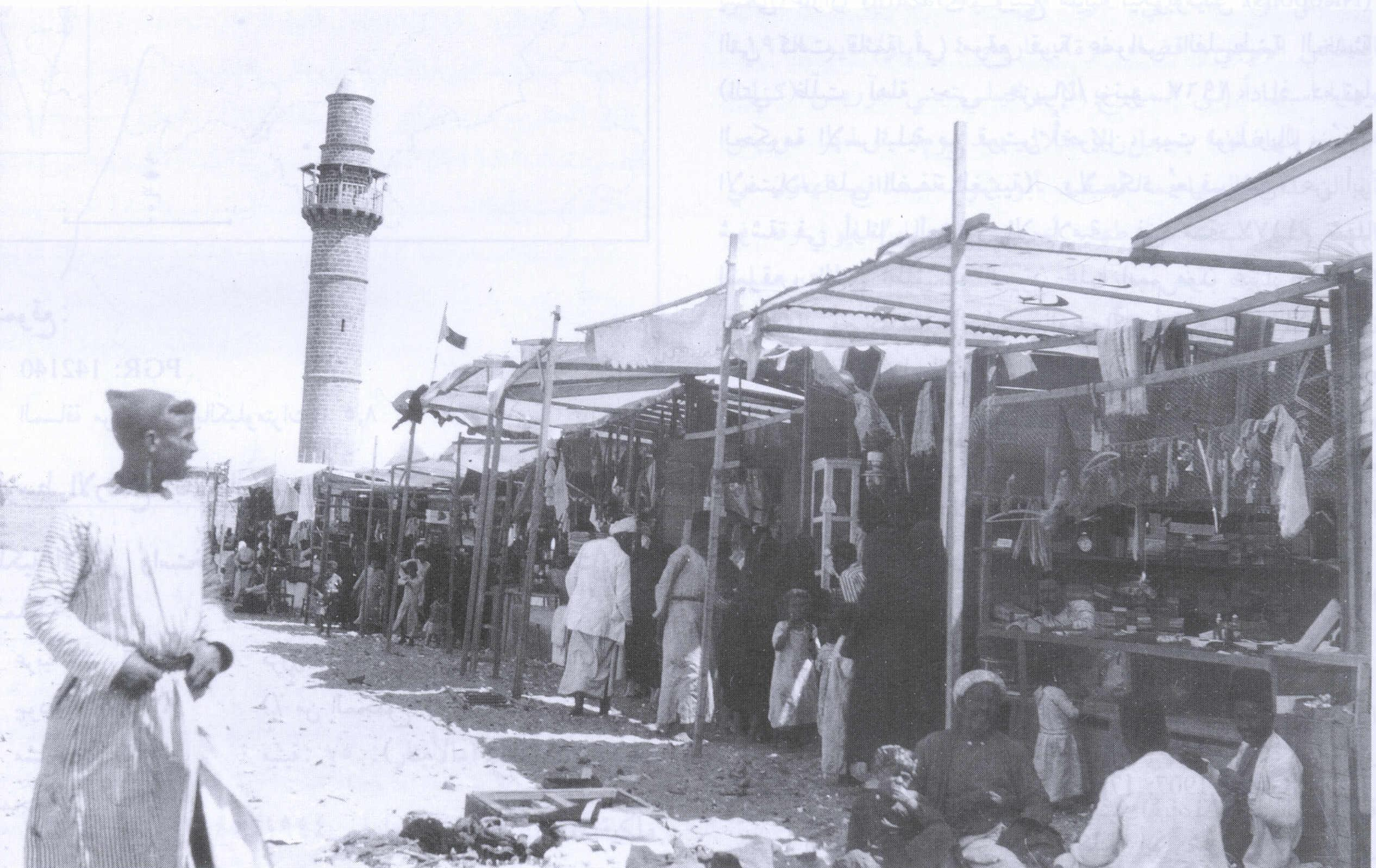
The annual mawsim ("religious festival") at Nabi Rubin in 1935

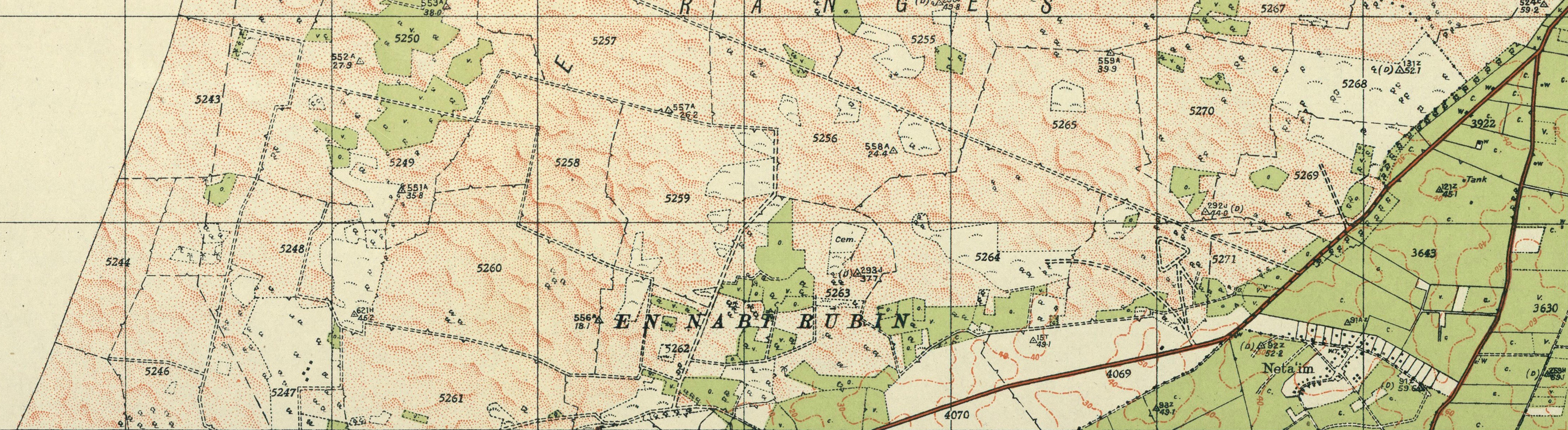
Nabi Rubin 1942 1:20,000

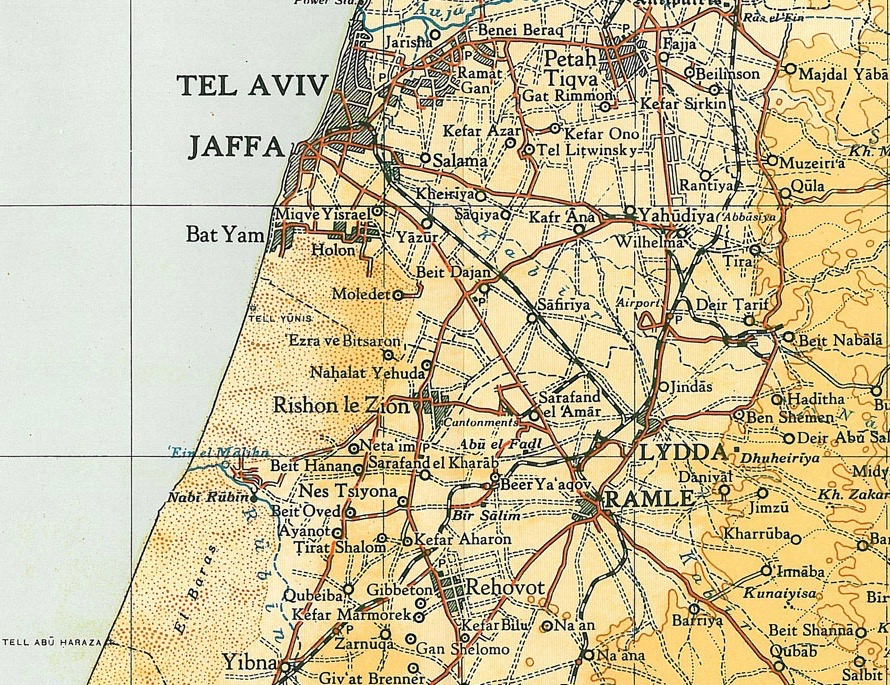
Nabi Rubin 1945 1:250,000 (lower left)

In the 1922 census of Palestine, conducted by the British Mandate authorities, Nabi Rubin, tribal area had a population of 120, all Muslims.

In 1933, during the Nabi Rubin celebrations, Arabs went on strike and rioted against British Mandatory rule. The first Palestinian film, a 1935 documentary, was also presented at the Nabi Rubin festivals. Up to 30,000 people made the pilgrimage annually throughout the month of August. Temporary coffeehouses, restaurants, and stalls selling food and other merchandise were set up, and people sang popular songs, — both religious and nationalist — and danced the traditional dabka. Sufi dervishes held dhikr sessions, and pilgrims also watched horse races, magic shows and listened to sermons from imams and poets. City wives, who virtually never socialized outside households, in particular "craved participation in the festival," and Tawfiq Canaan writes that they would announce to their husbands "Either you take me to Nabi Rubin, or you divorce me."

The writer S. Yizhar, who as a child sneaked over the sands from his home in Rehovot, later described:

"One finally arrives at Nabi Rubin and its mosque in the center, to watch by the light of bonfires...or even electricity from portable generators, the performance of the dances, the whirling of the dervishes, the colorful candy wrappers,...the pot-bellied swaying Gypsy woman ....while on the side, the singing keeps sawing away all time, not ceasing until the depths of night..."

The village's land area, most of which was covered by sand dunes, was the second largest in the district after that of Yibna, and was designated as an Islamic waqf ("pious endowment"). The Supreme Muslim Council attempted to further develop the area, and land settlement records show that local families maintained seasonal agriculture despite the challenges of encroaching dunes.

Some houses, scattered across the site without any discernible nucleus, were also built inside the fruit orchards. Shops, as well as a movie theater, were built in the neighborhood of the shrine. The villagers worked in agriculture and animal husbandry; they also catered to the visitors during the mawsim. They cultivated mainly grain, followed by citrus and other fruits, such as figs and grapes.

In the 1945 statistics the population was 1420, all Muslims, while the total land area was 31,002 dunams, according to an official land and population survey. Of this, a total of 683 dunums was devoted to citrus and banana cultivation, 4357 dunums were allocated to cereals, 184 dunums were irrigated or used for orchards, while 25,770 dunams were classified as non-cultivable land.

In 1946, a boys' school was started, with an enrollment of 56 pupils.

=== State of Israel ===
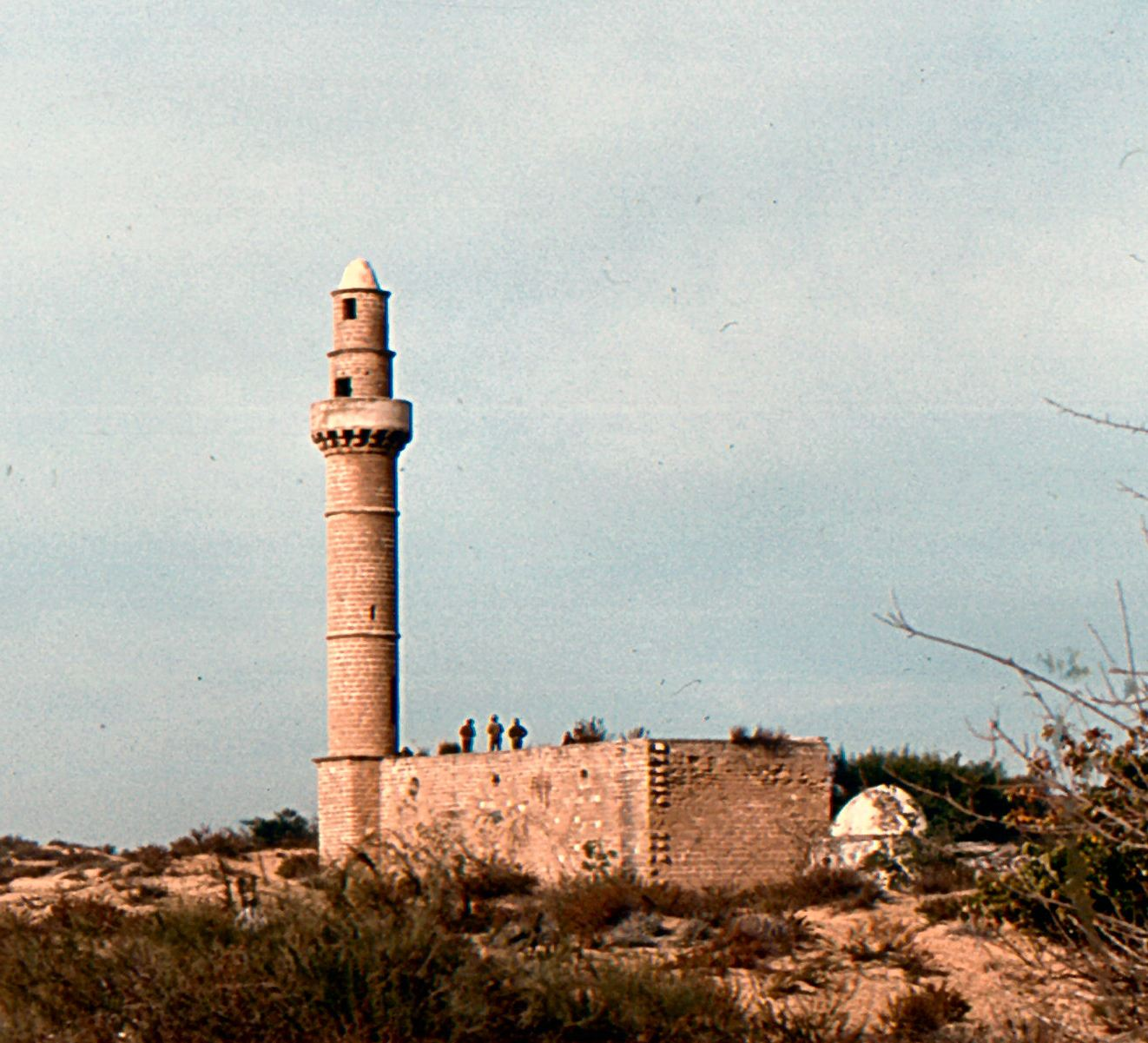
Nabi Rubin in 1985, with minaret still standing

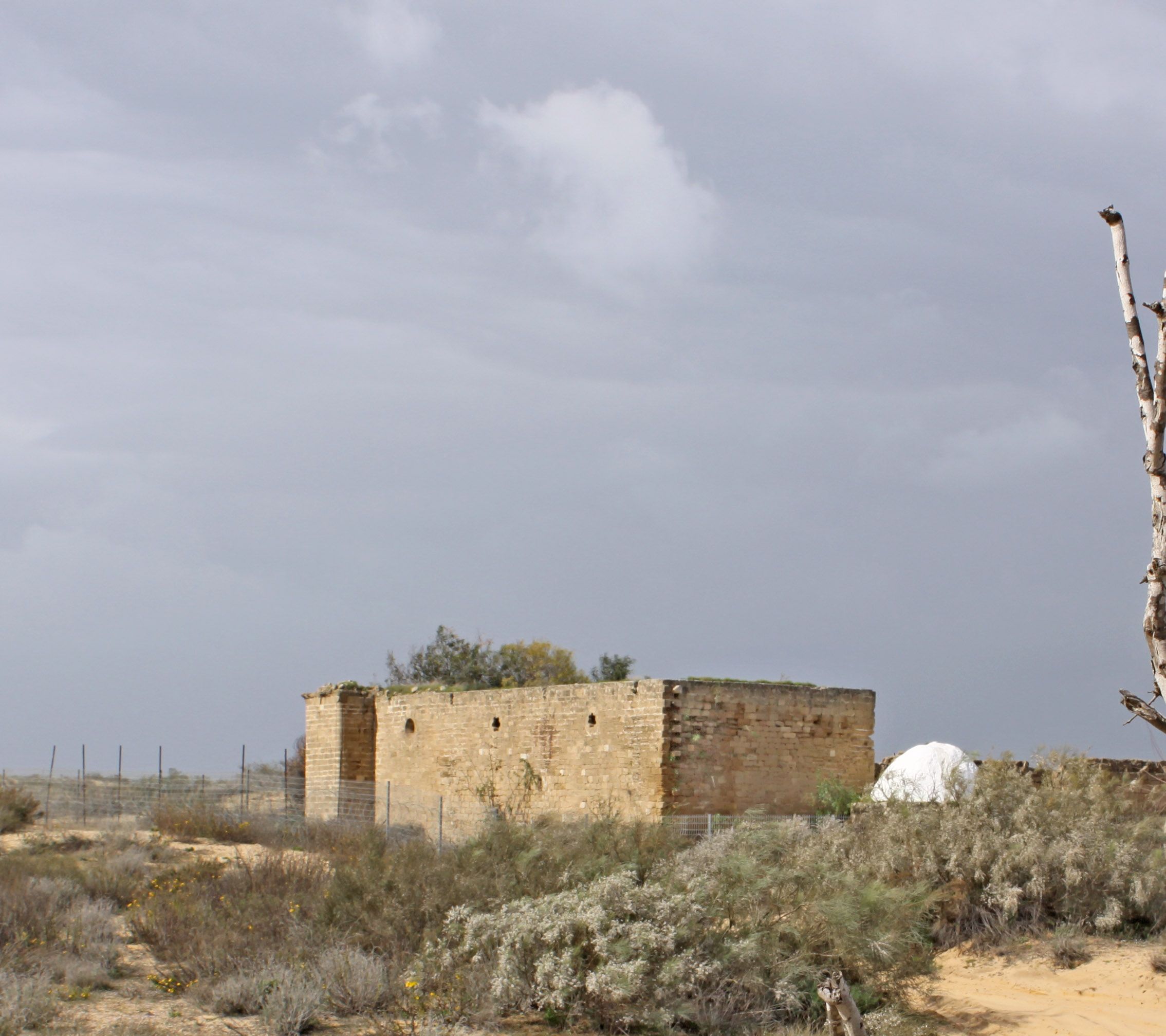
Nabi Rubin in 2012, with minaret gone

Nabi Rubin was located in a region which was targeted by Haganah's Operation Barak during the 1948 Arab–Israeli War, which aimed to force the Arab inhabitants to move. During the 10–12 May 1948, units of the Ephraim subdistrict, apparently without success, repeatedly mortared and raided Nabi Rubin, to force evacuation.

On June 1, 1948, Israel's Givati Brigade captured the village in the second stage of Operation Barak. Upon its capture, most of its inhabitants were expelled, except for a few who stayed until the harvest season to collect oranges, but they, too, were later expelled. On 24 August, the Giv'ati Brigade HQ issued the order for Operation Cleaning, aiming at 'cleansing' [letaher] the newly conquered area, which included Nabi Rubin. Any armed units were to be destroyed, and any Arab civilians were expelled. The operation took place on 28 August, and they "killed 10 Arabs, wounded three and captured 3". There were no Israeli army (IDF) casualties.

According to Salman Abu Sitta, in 1998, there were 10,116 Palestinian refugees from Nabi Rubin or their descendants.

In 1992, Walid Khalidi wrote, "The shrine of al-Nabi Rubin stands amid shrubs and other wild vegetation. A minaret that has three lancet-arched entrances stands at one end of it. A number of minor shrines built of large stones also remain. Near the shrine is a deserted, free-standing cement structure that consists of a single, box-shaped room."

The shrine of Reuben remained abandoned by most of the 20th century and deteriorated gradually; by 1991, the minaret of the mosque was torn down, as were centuries-old mulberry trees that had been located in the courtyard. Eventually, the shrine was reconsecrated as a Jewish holy site. In 2000, the green curtain with the Arabic inscription "There is no god but God, and Rubin is his prophet", which had been laid on the tomb, was replaced by a red one with a quotation in Hebrew from Genesis 49:3, "Reuben, thou art my firstborn, my might, and the beginning of my strength".

== See also ==
- Depopulated Palestinian locations in Israel
- List of villages depopulated during the Arab–Israeli conflict
- Nabi Musa
- Nabi Salih

== Bibliography ==
- Barron, J.B., ed. (1923). Palestine: Report and General Abstracts of the Census of 1922. Government of Palestine.
- Benvenisti, M. (2000). Sacred Landscape: The Buried History of the Holy Land Since 1948. University of California Press. p. 274. ISBN 978-0-520-23422-2. "Nabi Rubin Ramla."
- Clermont-Ganneau, C.S. (1896). [ARP] Archaeological Researches in Palestine 1873-1874, translated from the French by J. McFarlane. Vol. 2. London: Palestine Exploration Fund.
- Conder, C.R. (1886). Syrian Stone-lore. R. Bentley and Son.
- Conder, C.R.; Kitchener, H.H. (1882). The Survey of Western Palestine: Memoirs of the Topography, Orography, Hydrography, and Archaeology. Vol. 2. London: Committee of the Palestine Exploration Fund.
- Department of Statistics (1945). Village Statistics, April, 1945. Government of Palestine.
- Gertz, N.; Khleifi, George (2008). Palestinian Cinema: Landscape, Trauma, and Memory. Indiana University Press. ISBN 978-0-253-22007-3.
- Gonen, Rivka (2000). Biblical Holy Places: An Illustrated Guide. Paulist Press. ISBN 978-0-8091-3974-3.
- Gorzalczany, Amir; Lester, Ayala (2011-12-27). "Holot Yavne, Bedouin Jewelry". Hadashot Arkheologiyot – Excavations and Surveys in Israel. Vol. 123.
- Guérin, V. (1869). Description Géographique Historique et Archéologique de la Palestine (in French). Vol. 1: Judee, pt. 2. Paris: L'Imprimerie Nationale.
- Hadawi, S. (1970). Village Statistics of 1945: A Classification of Land and Area ownership in Palestine. Palestine Liberation Organization Research Center.
- Hartmann, M. (1883). "Die Ortschaftenliste des Liwa Jerusalem in dem türkischen Staatskalender für Syrien auf das Jahr 1288 der Flucht (1871)". Zeitschrift des Deutschen Palästina-Vereins. 6: 102–149.
- Irby, C.L.; Mangles, J. (1852). Travels in Egypt and Nubia, Syria, and the Holy Land: including a journey round the Dead Sea, and through the country east of the Jordan. J. Murray.
- Khalidi, W. (1992). All That Remains: The Palestinian Villages Occupied and Depopulated by Israel in 1948. Washington D.C.: Institute for Palestine Studies. ISBN 0-88728-224-5.
- Liebreich, Fritz (2005). Britain's Naval and Political Reaction to the Illegal Immigration of Jews to Palestine, 1945-1948 1948. Routeledge. ISBN 978-0-7146-5637-3.
- Mayer, L.A. (1933). Saracenic Heraldry: A Survey. Oxford: Oxford University Press.
- Morris, B. (2004). The Birth of the Palestinian Refugee Problem Revisited. Cambridge University Press. ISBN 978-0-521-00967-6.
- Palmer, E.H. (1881). The Survey of Western Palestine: Arabic and English Name Lists Collected During the Survey by Lieutenants Conder and Kitchener, R. E. Transliterated and Explained by E.H. Palmer. Committee of the Palestine Exploration Fund. p. 217
- Petersen, Andrew (2001). A Gazetteer of Buildings in Muslim Palestine: (British Academy Monographs in Archaeology). Vol. I. Oxford University Press. ISBN 978-0-19-727011-0.
- Socin, A. (1879). "Alphabetisches Verzeichniss von Ortschaften des Paschalik Jerusalem". Zeitschrift des Deutschen Palästina-Vereins. 2: 135–163.
