= Rehovot Natural Region =

Coordinates: 31°53′40″N 34°48′41″E

- Natural Region
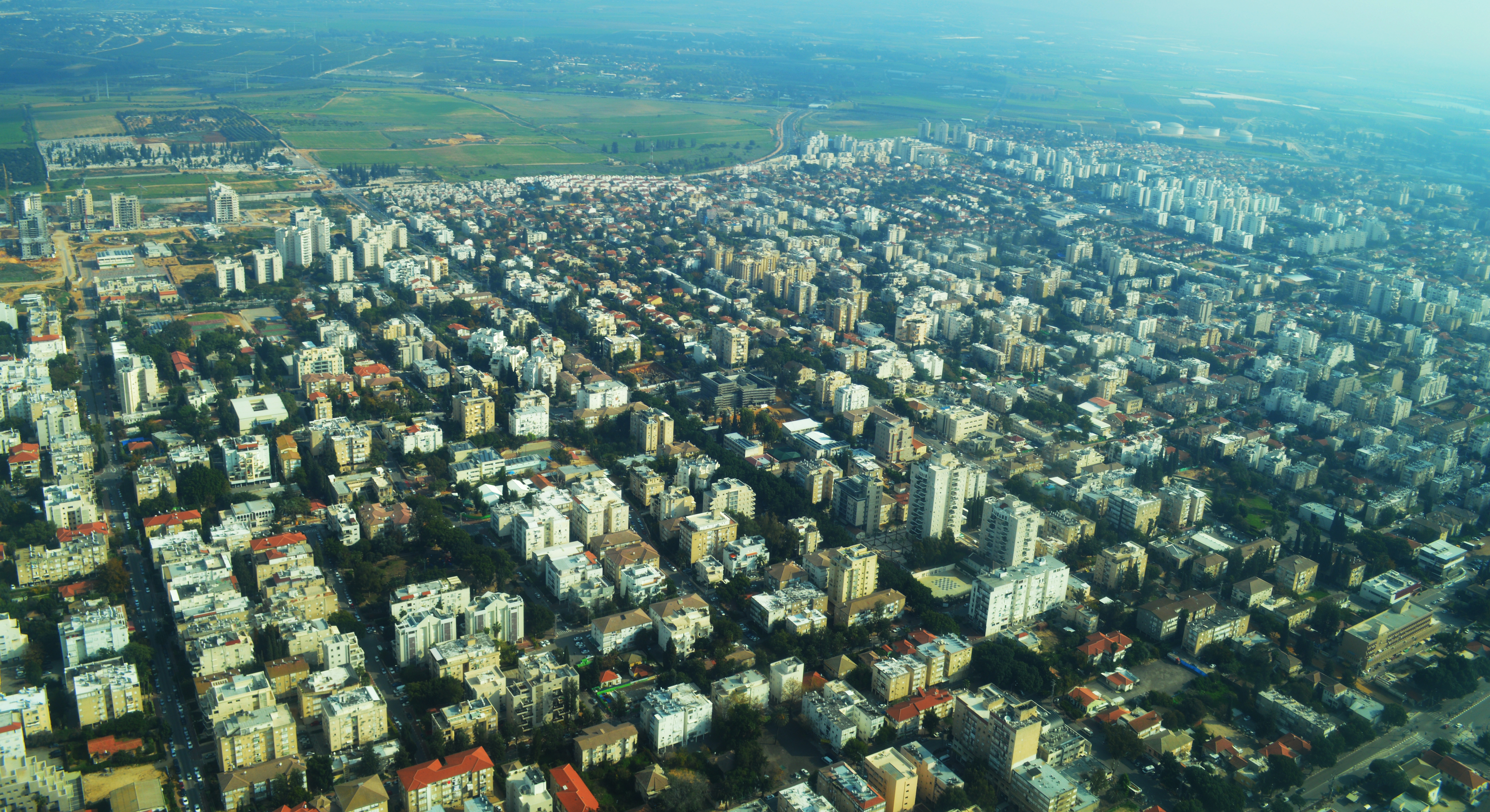
- View of Rehovot, the largest city of the Rehovot Natural Region
- Country: Israel
- District: Central
- Subdistrict: Rehovot
- Largest City: Rehovot

Area
  - Total: 207 km^{2} (80 sq mi)

Population (2024)
  - Total: 336,065

Ethnicity
  - Jews and others: 97.5%
  - Arabs: 0.4%

The Rehovot Natural Region is a natural region in the Rehovot Subdistrict, in the Central District of Israel. Rehovot is the largest city in the natural region.

== Geography ==
Districts, Subdistricts and Natural Regions of the State of Israel, 2018

The natural region consists of a portion of the Israeli coastal plain, north and east of Ashdod and south of Tel Aviv. It extends from Gan Yavne in the southwest to Mazkeret Batya in the east and Rehovot in the north. It has an area of 207 km^{2}. The largest city in the natural region is Rehovot, which contains 46 percent of the natural region's population. Two other major towns in the natural region are Yavne and Gedera. The natural region contains the Brenner, Gederot, Hevel Yavne, and Nahal Sorek regional councils along with a portion of the Gezer Regional Council.

== Demographics ==
The vast majority of the residents of the Rehovot Natural Region are Jewish. There are no Arab towns in the natural region.

Historical population
Year	Pop.	±%
1972	73,500	—
1983	109,800	+49.4%
1995	155,300	+41.4%
2008	228,820	+47.3%
2022	323,776	+41.5%
2024	336,065	+3.8%

== Administrative local authorities ==
Cities	Local Councils	Villages
Rehovot; Yavne	Bnei Ayish; Gan Yavne; Gedera; Kiryat Ekron; Mazkeret Batya	Brenner: Benaya; Beit Elazari; Gan Shlomo; Gibton; Givat Brenner; Kidron; Gederot: Aseret; Gan HaDarom; Kfar Aviv; Kfar Mordechai; Meishar; Misgav Dov; Shdema; Gezer: Ganei Yohanan; Kfar Bilu; Hevel Yavne: Beit Gamliel; Ben Zakai; Bnei Darom; Givat Washington; Kerem B'Yavneh; Kvutzat Yavne; Nir Galim; Nahal Sorek: Bnei Re'em; Beit Hilkia; Ganei Tal; Hafetz Haim; Netzer Hazani; Yad Binyamin; Yesodot

== Voting Patterns ==
In the 2022 election, 53 percent of voters in the natural region voted for the parties of the right-wing coalition led by Benjamin Netanyahu, while 43 percent voted for the parties of the center-left coalition led by Yair Lapid and 0.2 percent voted for the Arab parties.

In the 2026 election, 48 percent of voters in the natural region voted for the parties of the right-wing coalition led by Benjamin Netanyahu, while 45 percent voted for the parties of the center-left coalition led by Gadi Eisenkot and 0.3 percent voted for the Arab parties. An additional 4 percent voted for the Reservists, and 2.2 percent voted for Amcha Yisrael. Voter turnout increased 14 percent from the 2022 election.
