= Aseret =

Community settlement in central Israel

Aseret: עשרת (Hebrew)
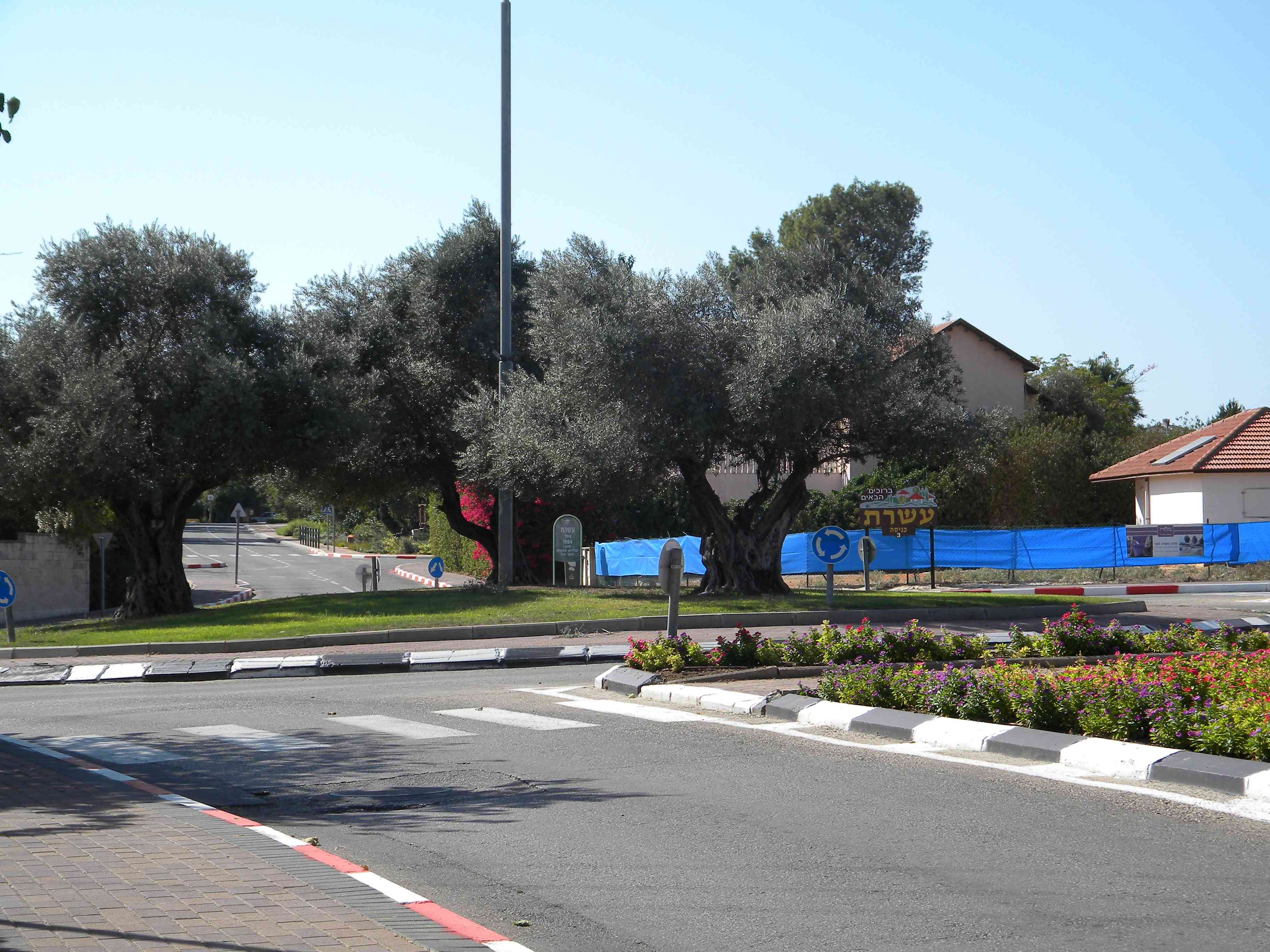
- Etymology: Ten (after ten members of Bilu)
- Location within Central Israel Location within Israel
- Coordinates: 31°49′29″N 34°44′49″E
- Country: Israel
- District: Central
- Subdistrict: Rehovot
- Council: Gederot
- Region: Shephelah
- Founded: 1954
- Population (2024): 1,009

Aseret (Hebrew: עשרת, lit. 'Ten') is a community settlement on the coastal plain of south-central Israel. Located near Gedera, it falls under the jurisdiction of Gederot Regional Council. In 2024 its population was 1,009.

It was founded in 1954 on the ruins of the depopulated Palestinian village of Bashshit. The word "Aseret" means ten, and the community is named after the ten members of Bilu who founded Gedera.

== History ==
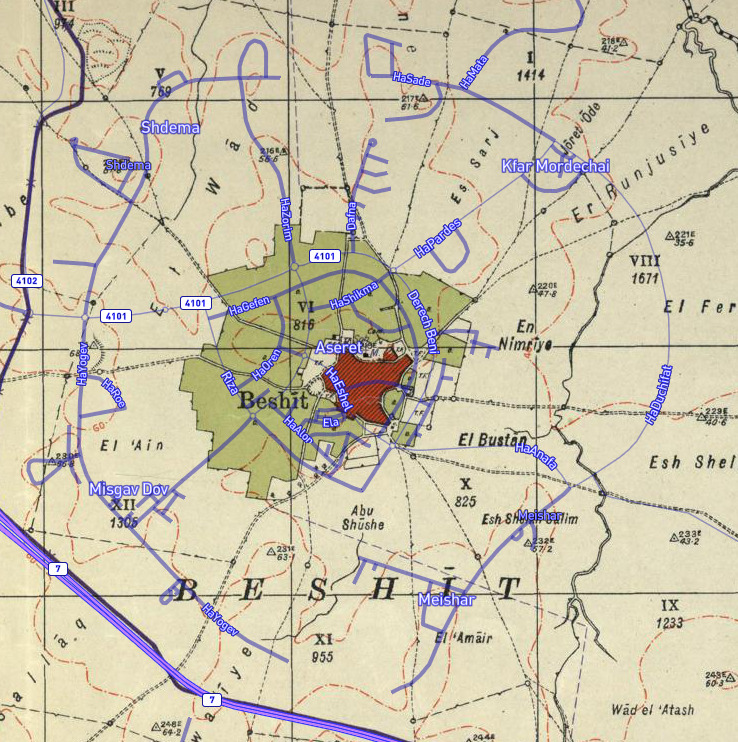
Modern Aseret overlaid on the historical area of Bashshit.

Aseret was founded in 1954 as the municipal center of Gederot Regional Council. It continues to serve this function today. Aseret is the center, both geographically and municipally, of the other six communities in the council: Meishar, Misgav Dov, Kfar Aviv, Kfar Mordechai, Shdema and Gan HaDarom.

Aseret was built on the lands of Bashshit, a Palestinian village depopulated in the 1948 Arab–Israeli War. There is an old tomb associated with Seth, the son of Adam in the Hebrew Bible. According to scholars of the Palestine Exploration Fund, the name Bashshit was derived from Beit Shit, meaning the "house of Seth. The tomb lies within a triple-domed mosque located on the side of a hill.
