= Kiryat Ekron =

Kiryat Ekron קִרְיַת עֶקְרוֹן
- Local council

Hebrew transcription(s)
  - ISO 259: Qiryat ʕeqron
  - Also spelled: Qiryath Eqron (official)
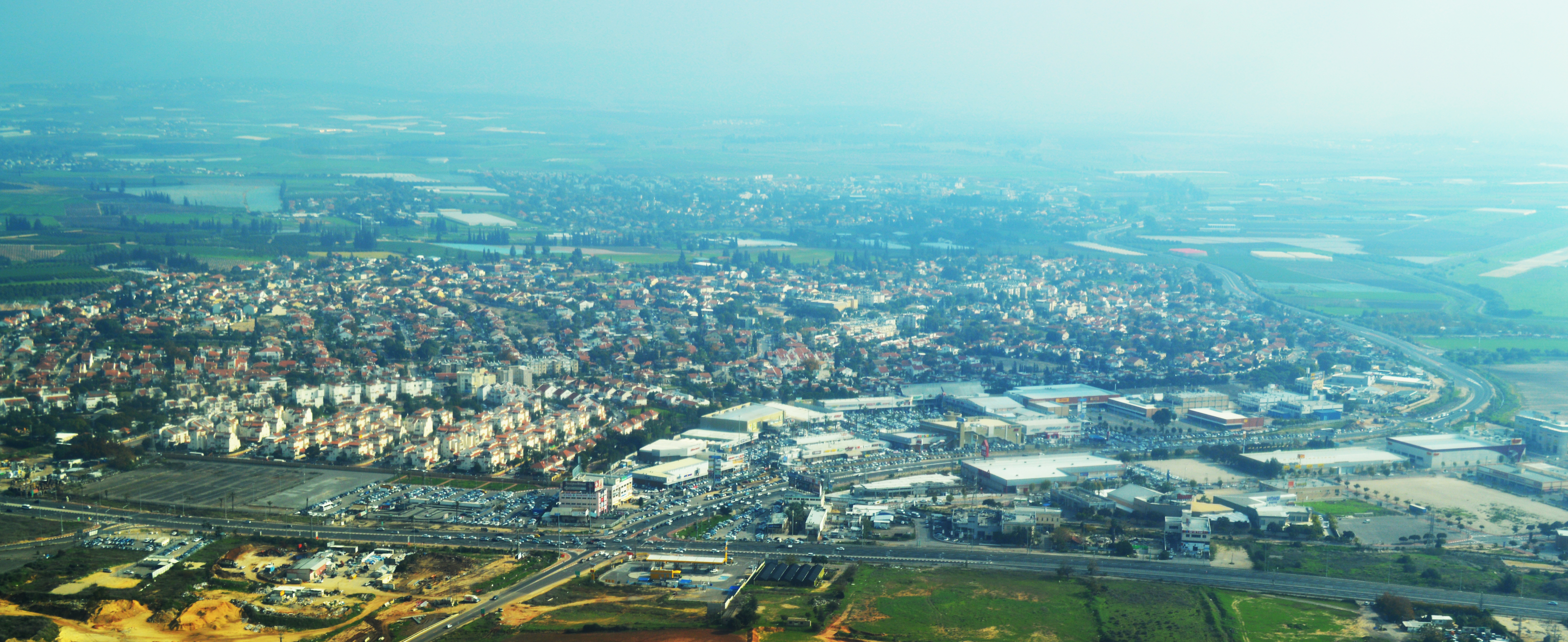

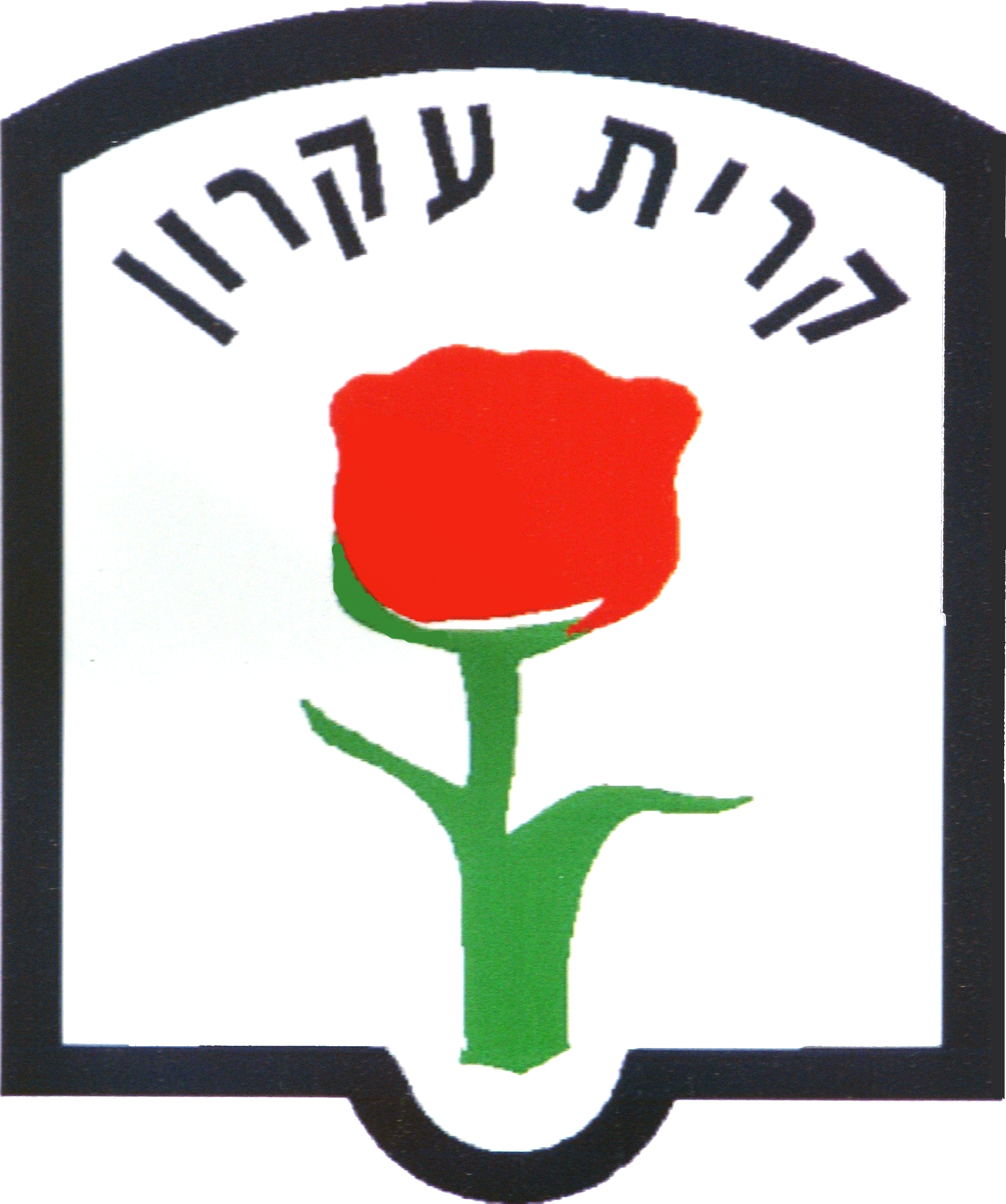
- Coat of arms

- Location within Central Israel
- Coordinates: 31°51′39.48″N 34°49′23″E
- Country: Israel
- District: Central
- Subdistrict: Rehovot
- Natural Region: Rehovot
- Founded: 1948

Government
  - Head of Municipality: Ilan Yarimi

Area
  - Total: 2,313 dunams (2.313 km^{2}; 0.893 sq mi)

Population (2024)
  - Total: 11,283
  - Density: 4,878/km^{2} (12,630/sq mi)

Ethnicity
  - Jews and others: 99.3%
  - Arabs: 0.7%

Kiryat Ekron or Qiryath Eqron (Hebrew: קִרְיַת עֶקְרוֹן, Arabic: كريات عكرون) is a town located on the coastal plain in the Central District of Israel. Located immediately south of the city of Rehovot on Highway 411 next to the Bilu Junction, in 2024 it had a population of 11,283.

== History ==
Kiryat Ekron was founded in 1948, as Kfar Ekron, on the site of the former Palestinian village of Aqir, and was named after the biblical Ekron, a major Philistine city that is believed to have once existed at nearby Tel Mikne. After the war, new immigrants from Yemen and Bulgaria settled in the remaining houses. In November 1948, two ma'abarot were established on the village's lands; the Aqir ma'abara, and the Givat Brenner ma'abara. In 1953, the Aqir ma'abara was officially made part of Kfar Ekron, followed by the Givat Brenner ma'abara in 1955. From 1954 to 1963, Kfar Ekron belonged to the Givat Brenner regional council. In 1963, the name of the town was changed to Kiryat Ekron, and it became an independent local municipality.

Attempts to unite Kiryat Ekron with the much larger municipality of Rehovot in 2003 failed after popular protest from residents of the town, as did similar attempts to unite Kiryat Ekron's municipality with that of the town of Mazkeret Batya due to opposition from the smaller town's residents the same year (Mazkeret Batya was originally called Ekron; its name was changed in 1887).

== Economy ==
A large outlet mall, "Bilu Centre", is located in Kiryat Ekron. The centre was built up in the late 1990s on land that was formerly agricultural, particularly citrus groves.

== Voting Patterns ==
In the 2022 election, 78 percent of voters in Kiryat Ekron voted for the parties of the right-wing coalition led by Benjamin Netanyahu, while 20 percent voted for the parties of the center-left coalition led by Yair Lapid and 0.3 percent voted for the Arab parties.

In the 2026 election, 74 percent of voters in Kiryat Ekron voted for the parties of the right-wing coalition led by Benjamin Netanyahu, while 19 percent voted for the parties of the center-left coalition led by Gadi Eisenkot and 0.4 percent voted for the Arab parties. An additional 4.5 percent voted for the Reservists, and 1.2 percent voted for Amcha Yisrael. Voter turnout increased 7 percent from the 2022 election.

== Notable residents ==
- Dudu Aharon, music artist

== Twin towns ==
Kiryat Ekron is twinned with:

- Bussy-Saint-Georges, France
- Akron, Ohio, United States
