= SPYDER =

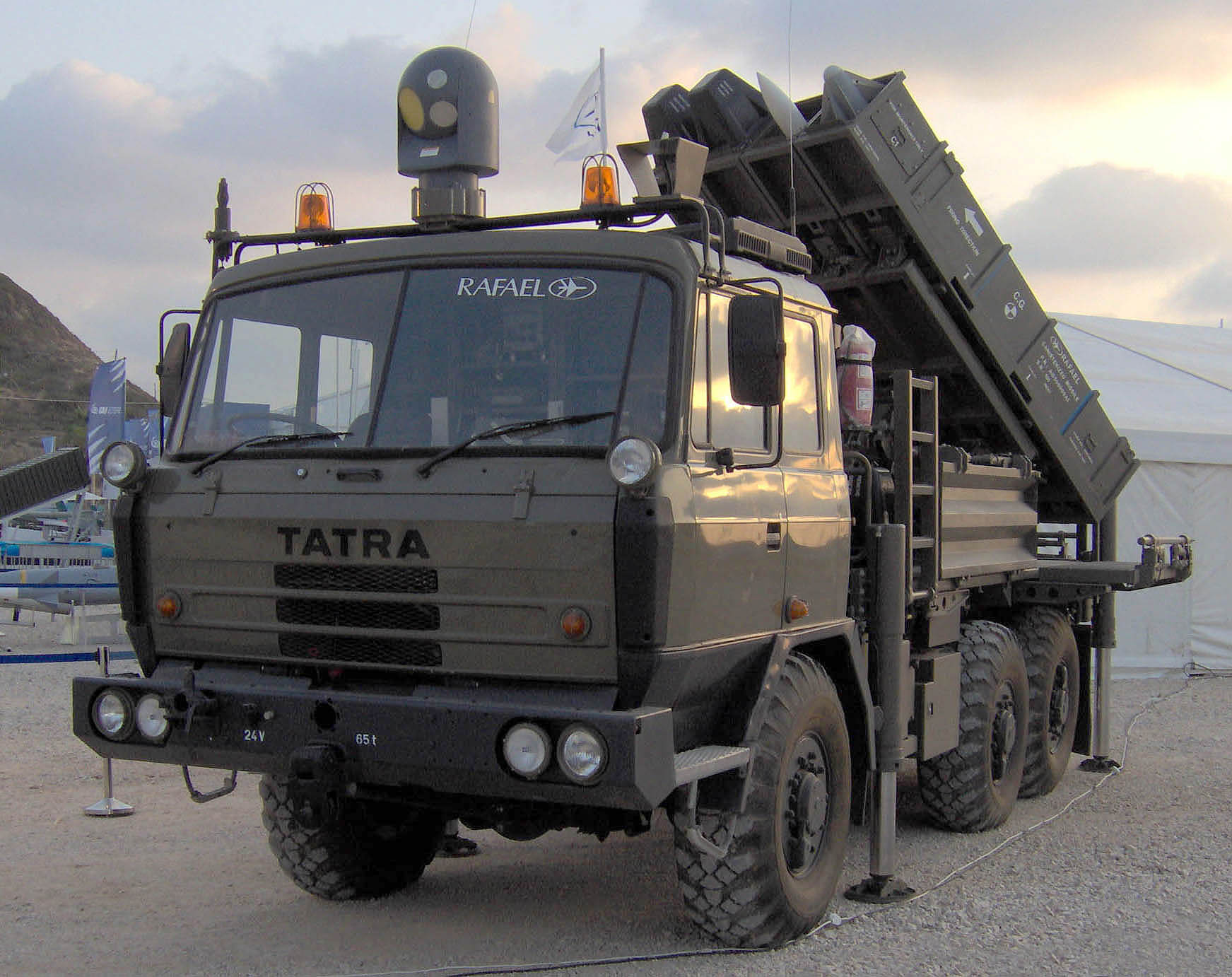
- A missile firing unit (MFU) of the SPYDER-SR system
- Type: Short and medium range air defence system
- Place of origin: Israel

Service history
- Used by: See Operators
- Wars: Russo-Georgian War; 2019 India–Pakistan border skirmishes

Production history
- Designer: Rafael Advanced Defense Systems
- Manufacturer: Rafael Advanced Defense Systems
- Produced: 2005–present
- Variants: SPYDER-SR; SPYDER-MR, SPYDER LR (counter TBM)

Specifications (SPYDER-SR)
- Mass: 105 kg (231 lb) (Python-5); 118 kg (260 lb) (Derby)
- Length: 3.1 m (10 ft 2 in) (Python-5); 3.62 m (11 ft 11 in) (Derby)
- Diameter: 160 mm (6.3 in) (both)
- Wingspan: 640 mm (2 ft 1 in) (both)
- Warhead: 11 kg (24 lb) (Python-5); 23 kg (51 lb) (Derby)
- Detonation mechanism: Active laser and electromagnetic proximity fuse with back-up impact fuse
- Main armament: ×4 Python-5 or Derby missiles in any combination per MFU
- Operational range: Python-5: 40 km (25 mi); Derby: 80 km (50 mi)
- Flight altitude: Python-5: 9,000 m (30,000 ft); Derby: 16,000 m (52,000 ft)
- Maximum speed: Mach 4
- Guidance system: Infrared homing and electro-optical imaging (Python-5); Active radar homing (Derby)
- Launch platform: Tatra 817 truck Mercedes-Benz Actros truck RMMV HX truck MAN TGS truck Scania P-series truck Dongfeng truck TELAR

The SPYDER ("Surface-to-air Python and Derby") is an Israeli short and medium range mobile air defence system developed by Rafael Advanced Defense Systems with assistance from Israel Aerospace Industries (IAI). Rafael is the prime contractor and IAI is the major subcontractor for the SPYDER program. This system achieved a notable milestone in 2005 when missiles were fired against test targets in Shdema, Israel and scored direct hits. Since then, it has been showcased in multiple military exhibitions throughout the world.

The SPYDER is a low-level, quick-reaction surface-to-air missile system capable of engaging aircraft, helicopters, unmanned air vehicles, drones, cruise missiles and precision-guided munitions. It provides air defence for fixed assets and for point and area defence for mobile forces in combat areas. The system is compatible and has been mounted on Tatra, Mercedes-Benz Actros, MAN TGS truck, Scania P-series, Dongfeng trucks and TELAR. It implements the Python-5 and Derby missiles of the same company. The SPYDER launcher is designed to fire Python-5 and Derby surface-to-air missiles which share full commonality with the air-to-air missiles. There are two variants of the SPYDER: the SPYDER-SR (short range) and the SPYDER-MR (medium range). Both systems are quick reaction, all weather, network-centric, multi-launchers, and self-propelled. A typical battery consists one central command and control unit, six missile firing units, and a resupply vehicle. The SPYDER-SR uses the EL/M-2106 ATAR radar while the SPYDER-MR incorporates the EL/M-2084 MMR radar. The latter is the same radar used by the Iron Dome system currently in service with the Israel Defense Forces.

Current operators of the SPYDER missiles system include Azerbaijan, Czech Republic, Ethiopia, Georgia, India, Philippines, Singapore, Vietnam, UAE, and Kenya. Peru's order for the SPYDER was pending as of 2012. There are reports that claim that Georgia operated the SPYDER-SR during the 2008 Russo-Georgian War but these allegations and assumptions have never been verified.

== Development ==
In 2005, the SPYDER successfully fired the Python 5 and Derby in a test range located in Shdema, Israel. The results were two direct kills against multiple targets. At the trial, the radar and command and control unit engaged the targets at both long and short ranges. The trial was part of a greater series of missile firings.

== Description ==
=== Command and control ===
==== EL/M-2106 ATAR ====
The Elta EL/M-2106 Advanced Tactical Acquisition Radar (ATAR) 3D Active electronically scanned array (AESA) surveillance radar is the Command and Control Unit (CCU) for the SPYDER-SR. This radar can track and engage multiple targets simultaneously and can control the missile firing units at a distance of up to 10 km away from the CCU. The E/LM-2106 ATAR is a fourth generation defence radar designed by Elta and operates in the L-band wavelength. It is a field proven design that has operated in undesirable environments according to the designers and manufacturers. The range of detection for a fighter aircraft is 70–110 km. It can detect hovering helicopters at a range of 40 km and UAVs at 40–60 km.

==== EL/M-2084 MMR ====
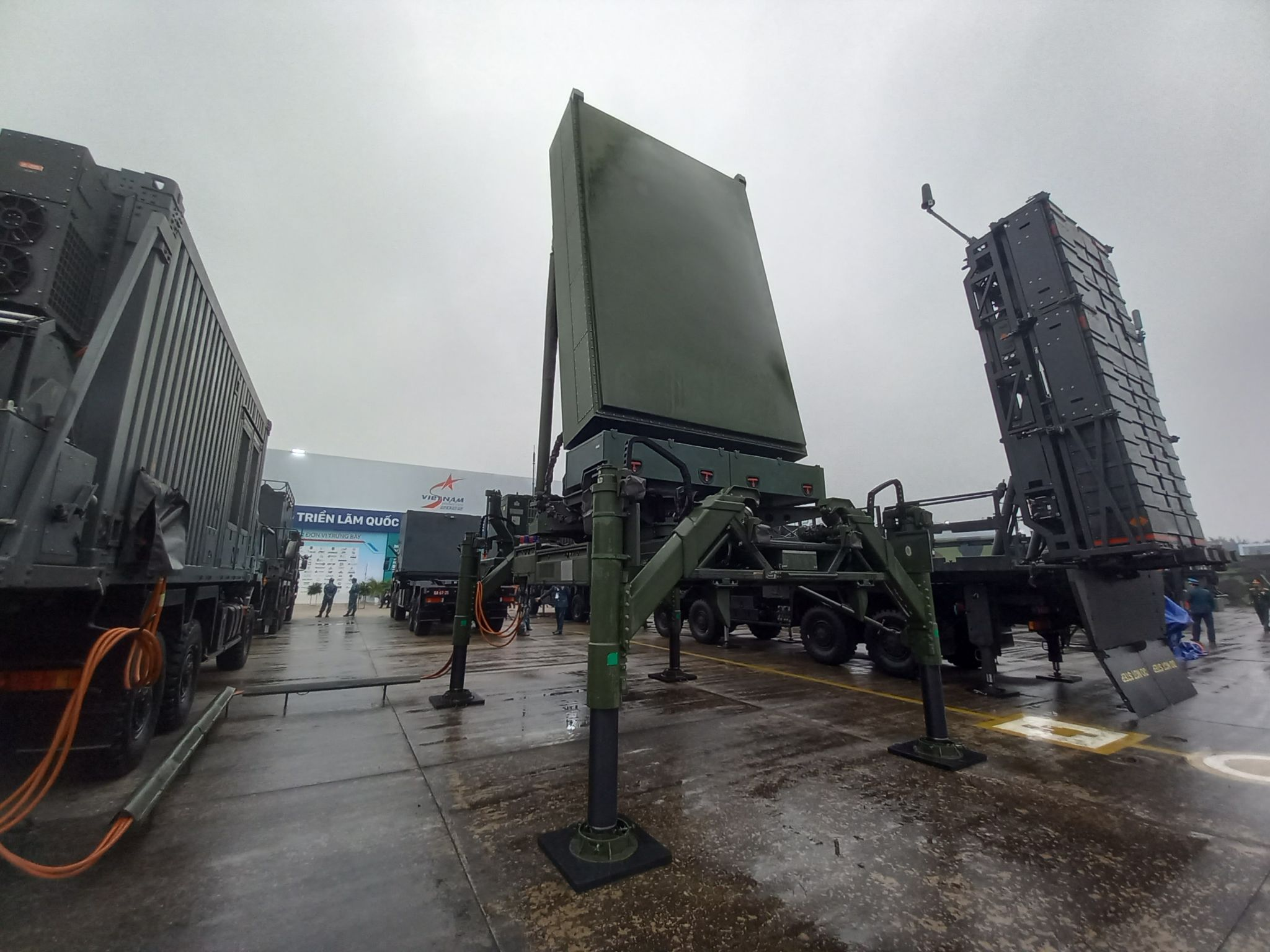
An EL/M-2084 multi-mission radar besides a SPYDER-MR MFU of Vietnam.

The radar sensor unit of the SPYDER-MR comprises the EL/M-2084 Multi Mission Radar (MMR) 3D AESA radar. The EL/M-2084 operates in the S-band. It can process up to 1200 targets when in air surveillance mode and also detects targets located 250 km away. When the radar is static, it covers 120° in the azimuth.

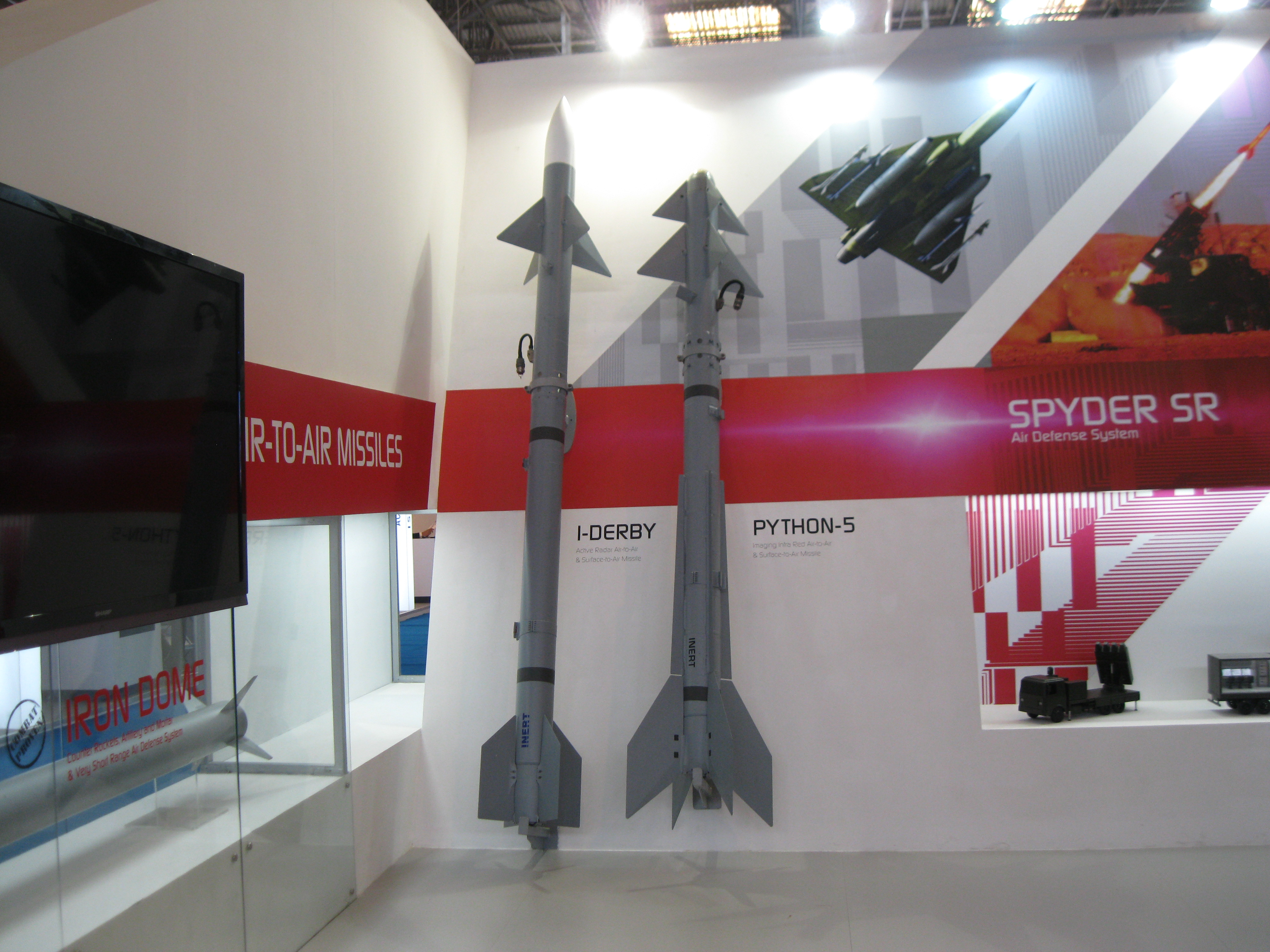
A pair of Python-5 and I-Derby missiles without boosters for SPYDER-SR.

=== Surface-to-air missiles ===
==== Ranges of Interception ====
As a short range air defence system, the SPYDER-SR has a short range of interception. The maximum altitude of interception is 9 km and the maximum range of interception is 15 km. The SPYDER-MR has a greater operation range of 35 km and an altitude engagement of 16 km due to the missiles being equipped with boosters. (Note: The official brochure of the SPYDER missile system by Rafael Advanced Defense Systems contradicts the figures for the interception range for both the SPYDER-SR and SPYDER-MR. The brochure mentions that the interception range of the SPYDER-SR is 20 km instead of the 15 km and 50 km instead of 35 km for the SPYDER-MR.)

==== Python-5 ====
The Python-5 is currently the most capable air-to-air missile (AAM) in Israel's inventory. It is capable of "lock-on after launch" (LOAL), and has all-aspect/all-direction (including rearward) attack ability. The missile features an advanced electro-optical infrared homing (with imaging infrared) seeker which scans the target area for hostile aircraft, then locks-on for terminal chase.

- Length: 310 cm
- Span: 64 cm
- Diameter: 16 cm
- Weight: 105 kg
- Guidance: infrared homing + electro-optical imaging
- Warhead: 11 kg
- Speed: Mach 4

==== Derby ====
The Derby is an active radar homing AAM that provides the SPYDER missile system with a fire-and-forget option due to its active radar guidance.

- Length: 362 cm
- Span: 64 cm
- Diameter: 16 cm
- Weight: 118 kg
- Guidance: Active radar homing
- Warhead: 23 kg
- Speed: Mach 4

In January 2023, Rafael announced that they had upgraded the Spyder to be able to counter tactical ballistic missiles by performing hardware and software upgrades to the Derby LR missile interceptor.

== Variants ==
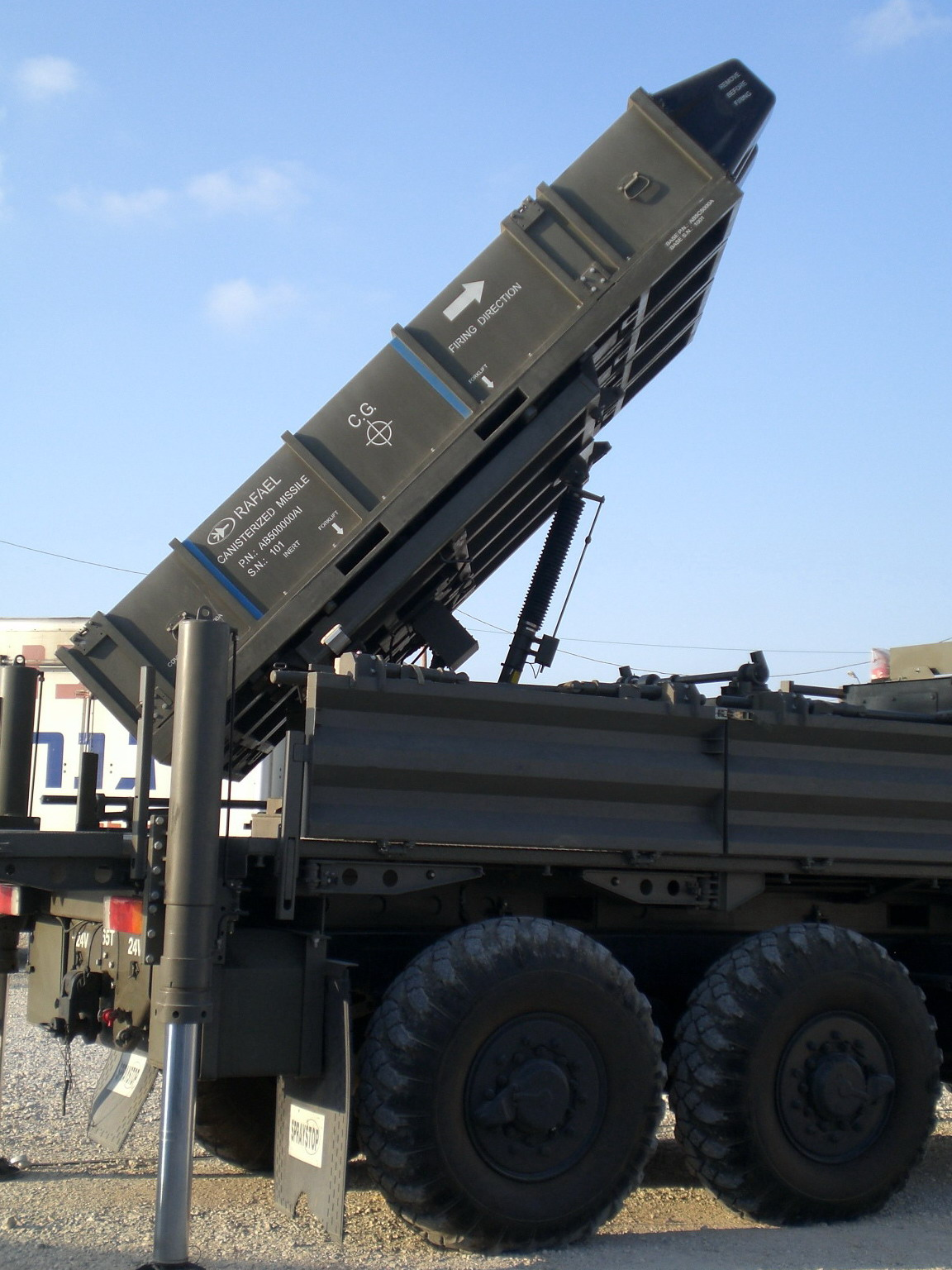
The inclined, rotatable launcher used by the SPYDER-SR and SPYDER-ER variants.

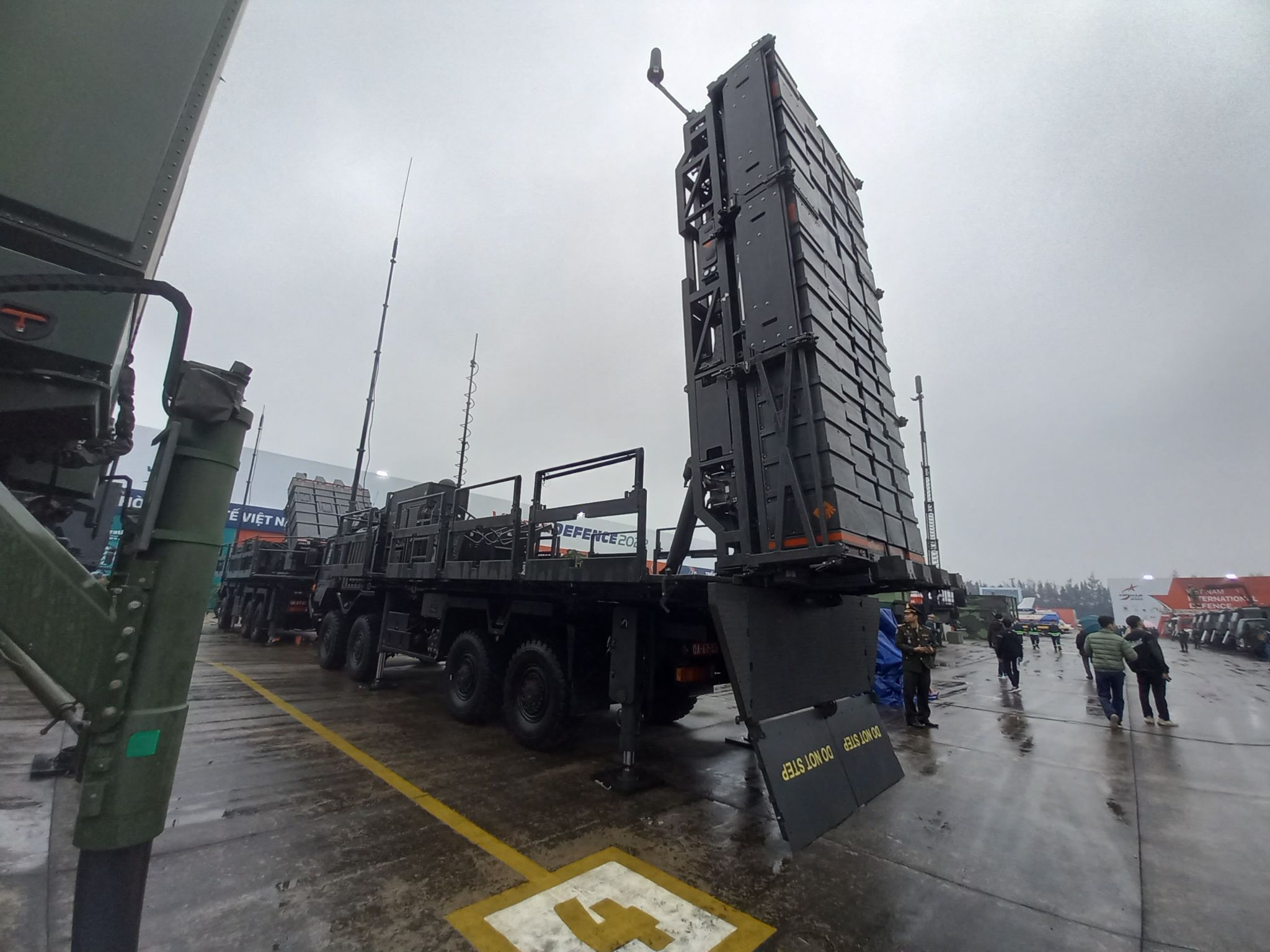
The vertical, non-rotatable launcher of the booster-featured SPYDER-MR and SPYDER-LR. An inclined SPYDER-SR launcher is also visible in the background.

SPYDER-SR and SPYDER-ER 360° slant launching missile systems provide quick reaction, lock-on-before-launch (LOBL) and lock-on-after launch (LOAL) capabilities, while extending the range of defense to up to a 40 km radius.

SPYDER-MR and SPYDER-LR offer medium & long range target interception through vertical launch while pushing the defense envelope up to an 80 km radius.

Both systems enable a 360° launch within seconds of the target being declared hostile ‒ and provide all-weather, multi-launch, and net-centric capabilities.

The SPYDER systems have advanced ECCM capabilities and use electro-optical observation payloads as well as wireless data link communication.

The SPYDER All-in-One (AiO) configuration integrates the radar, command and control, and missile launchers onto a single 8×8 high-mobility vehicle chassis, rather than relying on a distributed battery structure. Designed for rapid deployment and independent operation against maneuvering forces or drone swarms, the AiO features "search-on-the-move" capabilities and carries up to eight canisterized Python-5 or I-Derby interceptors. In January 2024, the system successfully demonstrated a live-fire interception of a UAV during testing by the Israeli Ministry of Defense.

== Operational use ==
- During the Russo-Georgian War of 2008, it was believed that Georgia operated the SPYDER-SR. The Georgian air force could have operated up to four launchers of the SPYDER-SR.
- On 26 February 2019, after the Balakot Airstrike, India used a SPYDER system to shoot down a surveillance drone of the Pakistan Armed Forces at the Indo-Pakistan Border at Gujarat.
- On 27 February 2019, during the 2019 Jammu and Kashmir airstrikes, Indian SPYDER system shot down an Indian Air Force (IAF) Mil Mi-17 in Budgam, Kashmir. All six IAF personnel on board the helicopter and one civilian on the ground were killed. After 6 months of investigation, IAF confirmed that shooting down of Mi-17 was a friendly fire and 5 IAF personnel were held guilty.

== Operators ==
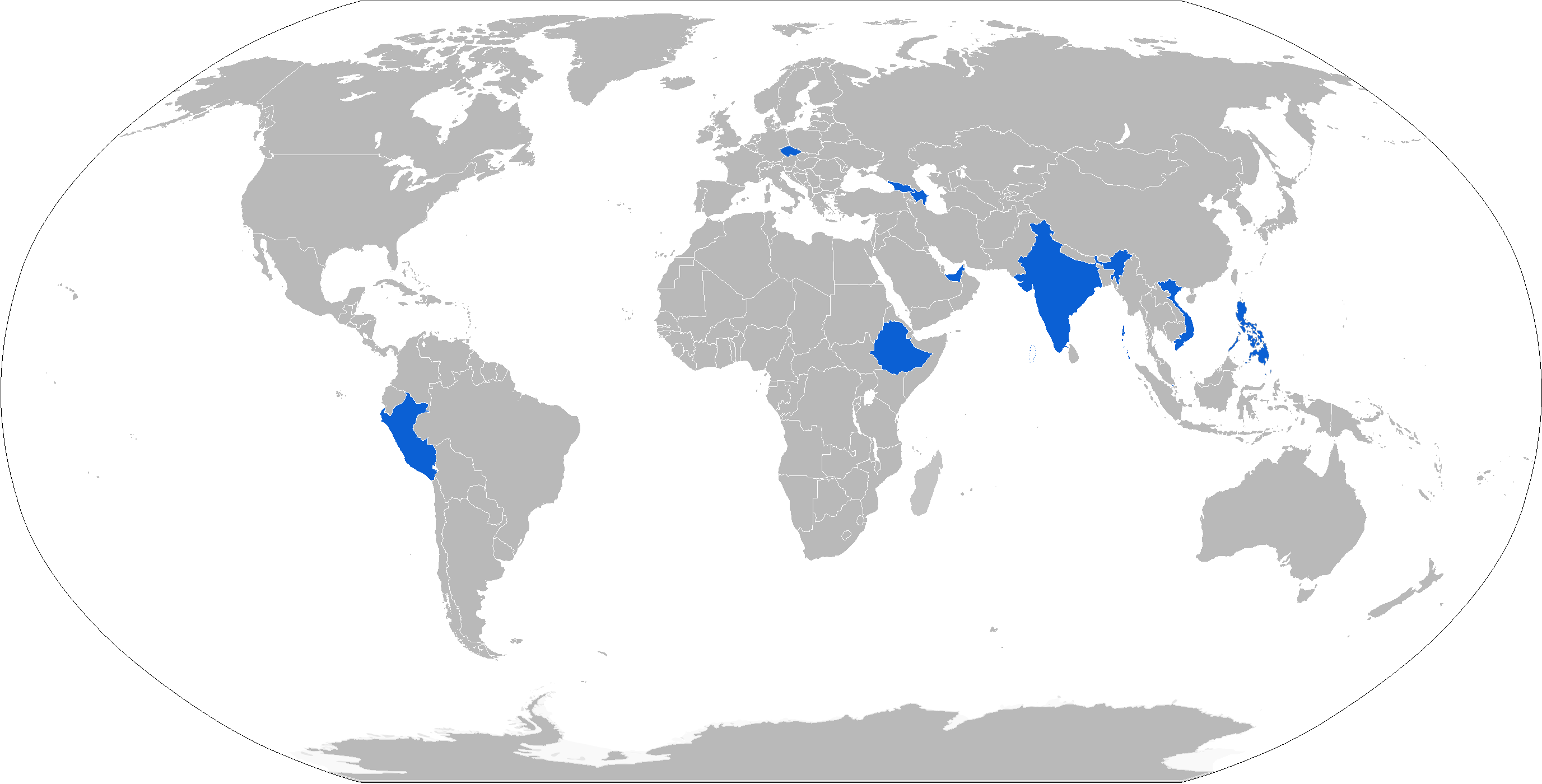
Map with SPYDER operators in blue

=== Current operators ===
Azerbaijan
In 2012, Azerbaijan and Israel signed a $1.6 billion contract to supply an unknown quantity of Spyder and Barak-8 SAM to Azerbaijan.

Czech Republic
Czech Armed Forces – On 27 September 2021, the Czech government announced that it had signed an agreement to purchase four SPYDER batteries. The Czech Ministry of Defense said that the value of the deal was $627 million, and that delivery of the systems was scheduled to be completed by 2026. Under the contract, the Czech defense industry would take part in the program, supplying products and services worth more than 30 percent of its value. In July 2024 the first battery arrived in the Czech Republic, with full operational capability expected by 2026.

Ethiopia
Ethiopian Air Force bought the SPYDER-MR air defense system to protect the Grand Ethiopian Renaissance Dam from possible air strikes. The amount is not exactly reported but sources have confirmed it is in Ethiopia. The Arab Weekly reported it in 2019. The African Intelligence also reported on the SAM systems arriving to the Grand Ethiopian Renaissance Dam. Debka also reported on the SPYDER-MR air defense systems arriving in Ethiopia.

India

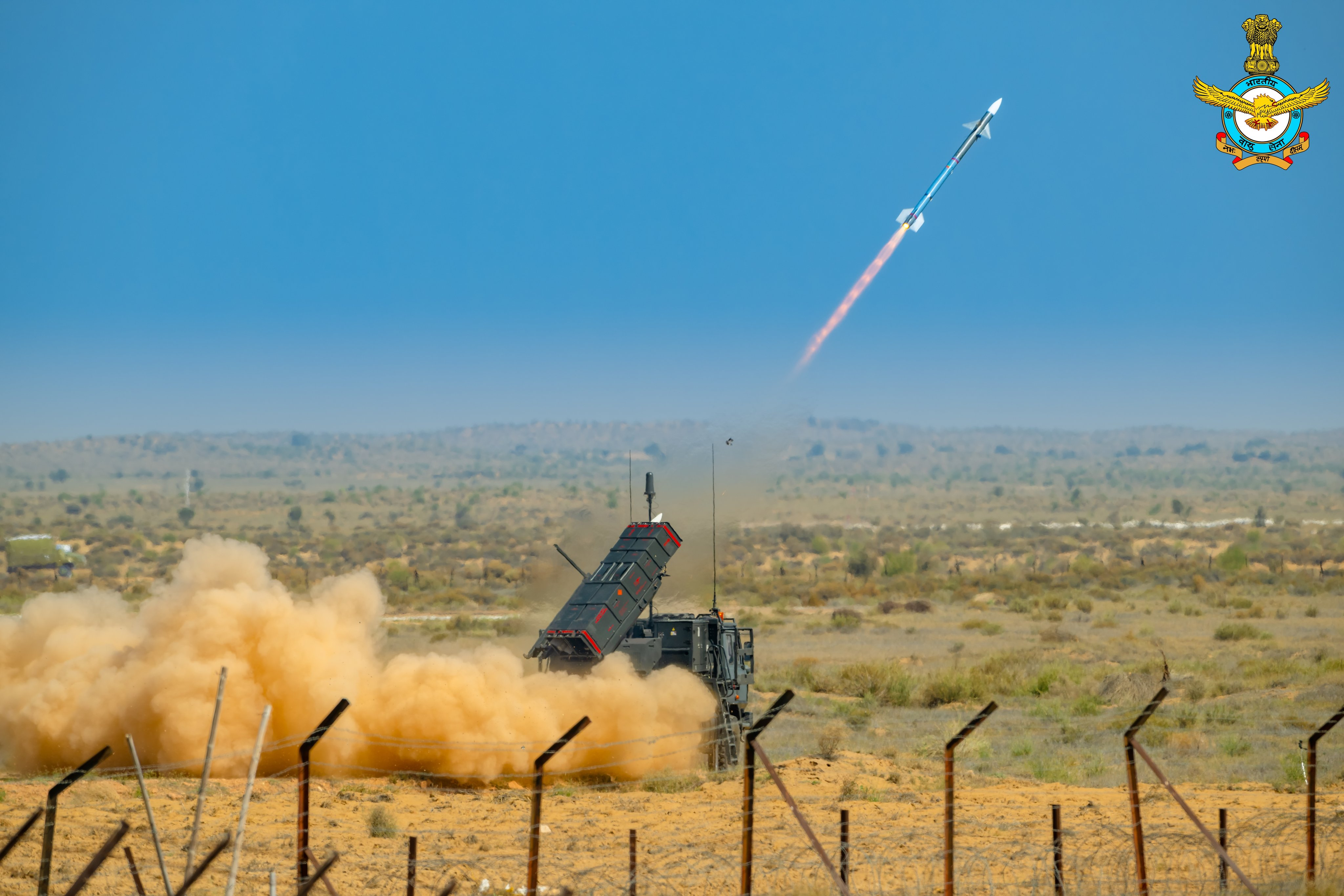
SPYDER quick reaction air defence system of Indian Air Force firing a Derby missile

Indian Air Force – In 2006, India planned to acquire 18 SPYDER-MR systems at a cost of $395.2 million (₹1,800 crore) for its air force. The contract was reviewed by the Central Vigilance Commission, the Government’s anti-corruption agency, before the agreement was signed in September 2008. In August 2009, the multibillion-dollar contract for Israeli anti-aircraft missiles was cleared by the Defence Acquisition Council headed by defence minister AK Antony. Although previous estimates of the contract's value was ₹1,800 crore ($395.2 million), recent reports indicate a lower value of $260 million. The Jerusalem Post contradicted these figures and mentions a price of $1 billion for the purchase of the surface-to-air missiles. The SPYDER systems were delivered starting in 2012. 18 batteries of SPYDER-MRs along with 750 Python-5 surface to air missiles (SAMs) and 750 Derby SAMs have been delivered. In August 2025, the Defence Acquisition Council (DAC) had cleared the project for upgradation of Saksham anti-air missile system, the local name of SPYDER system, along with its integration into the IACCS.

Kenya
Kenya Defence Forces – In 2024, Kenya received a KSh1 billion loan from Israel to acquire the Spyder missile defence system. In 2025, Kenya received an additional KSh3.4 billion (approximately $26 million) loan from Israel. The funding would support the procurement of advanced military hardware, SPYDER, including repayment of the previous Sh1 billion loan used to acquire the air defense system. Disbursement to the Ministry of defense was expected in July 2025. The Sh3.4 billion loan from Israel would cover 69% of the Defense Ministry’s development budget for the 2025-26 fiscal year. The system was delivered in December 2025.

Morocco
Royal Moroccan Army – Morocco signed a contract to buy SPYDER from Israel.

Peru
Peruvian Armed Forces – In March 2012, Peru chose the winners of a $140 million competition meant to upgrade its ageing air defence systems out of the group of 20 defence companies. Amidst the presence of Russia's Rosoboronexport and Chinese firms, the winners were Poland's Bumar Group, Israel's Rafael Advanced Defence Systems, and the USA's Northrop Grumman. Rafael industries is expected to supply six SPYDER-SR systems in this deal. Status of the deal in unclear.

Philippines
Philippine Air Force – Three batteries of the SPYDER-MR air defense system were purchased in a deal said to be worth over $141 million (or around PHP 7,996,351,276). Two batteries called SPYDER Philippine Air Defense System (SPADS) were formally inducted into service in November 2022 and are assign and operated by the 960th Air and Missile Defense Group. The 3rd and last battery was delivered in November 2024. The systems are mounted onboard Czech Tatra T815-7 High Mobility Trucks.

Singapore
Republic of Singapore Air Force – In 2008, the Ministry of Defence ordered two SPYDER-SR batteries along with 75 Python-5 SAMs and 75 Derby SAMs. They were all delivered during 2011 and 2012. Some SPYDER-SRs were operated by the 165 Squadron in 2011, it is also reported that more SPYDER-SRs are on order. The RSAF SPYDER is mounted on MAN RMMV TG-MIL trucks. The SPYDER system achieved full operational capacity on 4 July 2018.

United Arab Emirates
United Arab Emirates Army – In 2022, the United Arab Emirates bought an undisclosed number of SPYDER missile systems.

Vietnam
VPA Air Defence – In 2015, Vietnam chose the SPYDER missile system as its new medium-range air defense missile system. First deliveries were highlighted in July 2016. Vietnamese systems are mounted on RMMV HX range trucks. Five systems including 375 Python missiles and 375 Derby missiles were reportedly acquired.

=== Potential operators ===
Georgia
Defense Forces of Georgia – There were reports that a battery of the SPYDER missile system was operated in 2008. No official confirmation exists and the Stockholm International Peace Research Institute (SIPRI) arms transfer database cannot confirm this. Jane's Missiles & Rockets magazine previously cited a Rafael representative claiming that one of the two export customers of the SPYDER missile system already has theirs deployed.

=== Future operators ===
Romania
Romanian Land Forces – €3.85 billion for 41 launchers, to be purchased in two phases as part of the SHORAD/VSHORAD program. It was in competition against the NASAMS from Kongsberg, the VL Mica from MBDA France, the KM-SAM from Hanwha and the IRIS-T SLM. SPYDER was selected as the winner of the program in July 2025. The contract was officially signed in June 2026. The SHORAD component is covered by the base Python 5 and Derby missiles, while the VSHORAD component will be covered by Piorun missiles integrated for SPYDER.

Greece
In August 2026, Greece ordered SPYDER, along with Barak MX and David's Sling, as part of the Achilles' Shield layered air defense system.

== See also ==
- Iron Dome – (Israel)
- Arrow – (Israel)
- Barak 1 – (Israel)
- David's Sling – (Israel)
