= Dudu Aharon =

Israeli musical artist

Dudu Aharon דודו אהרון
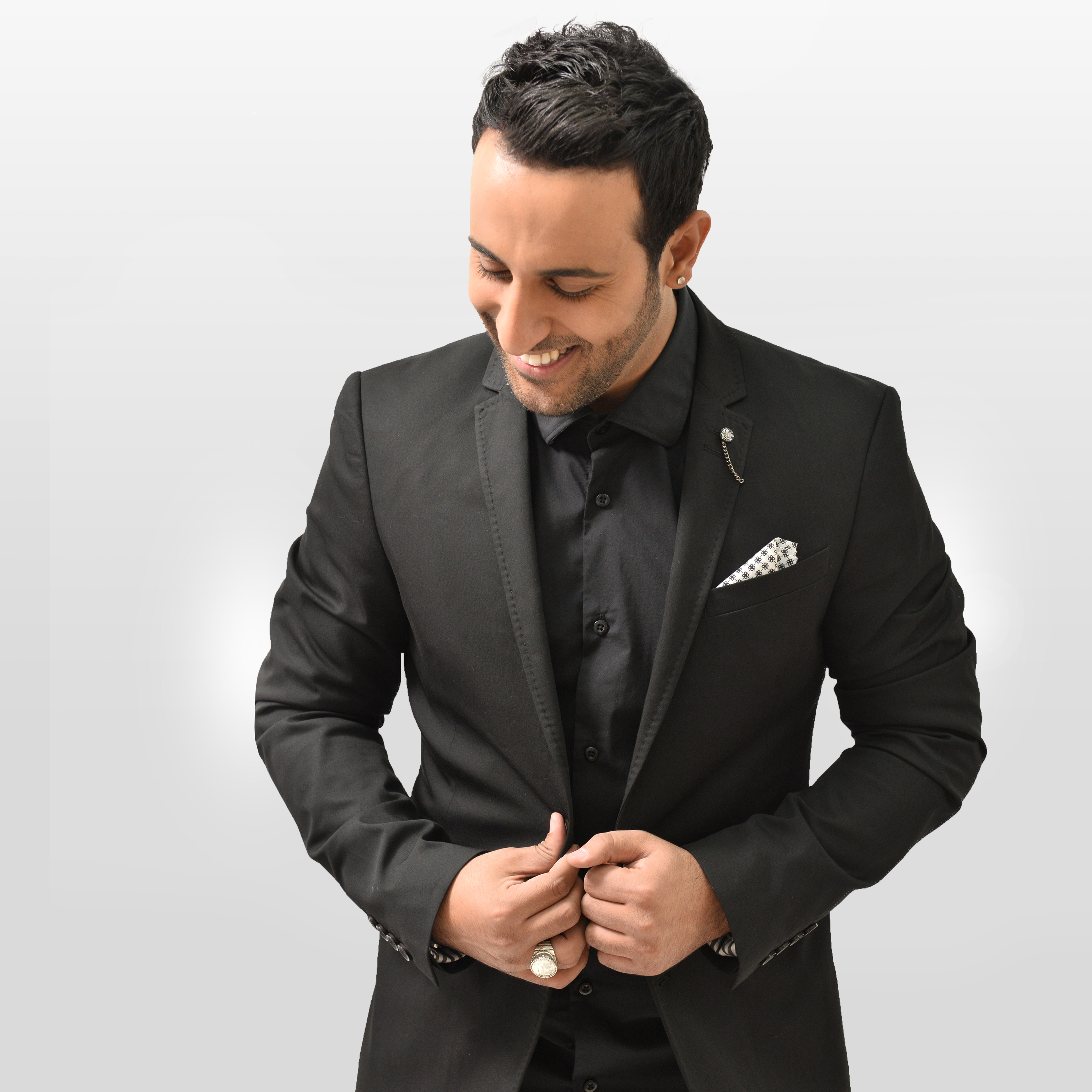
- Dudu Aharon in 2015

Background information
- Born: 23 December 1984 (age 41); Kiryat Ekron, Israel
- Origin: Israel
- Genres: Pop; Hebrew; Mizrahi
- Occupations: Singer-songwriter; Musician; Composer
- Years active: 2007–present
- Website: dudu-aharon.co.il

Dudu Aharon (Hebrew: דודו אהרון; born on 23 December 1984) is a singer-songwriter, musician, and composer from Israel.

== Biography ==
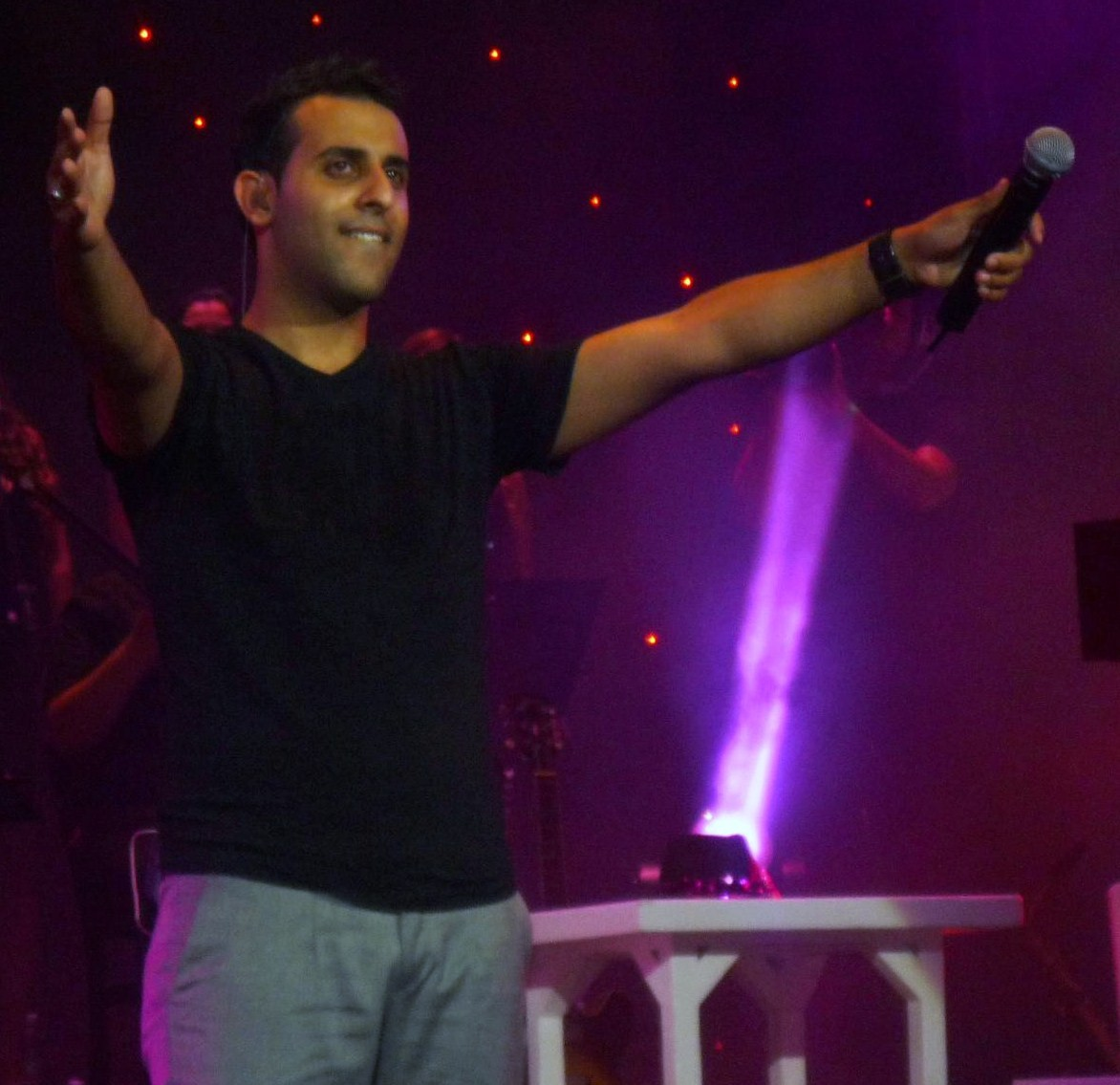
Dudu Aharon in concert

David (Dudu) Aharon was born in Kiryat Ekron, and is of Yemenite-Jewish origin. He began his musical career as a child, singing in the Har Yosef Synagogue in Kiryat Ekron. Aharon later began to perform at various clubs and events around Israel. During his national service, Aharon served in the Israel Border Police, and began performing in the Red 6 club in his free time. In 2007, after he completed his service, he released his first single, which was a success and became a hit on Mizrahi music radio programs. He produced more singles and increased his appearances at clubs and events. In 2007, he released his debut album, First Love. He subsequently released five more albums and numerous singles, becoming one of Israel's leading singers of Mizrahi Music.

In 2011, Aharon took part a television reality show called "Live in LA LA Land," in which he and five other singers sought their fortune in Los Angeles. In 2013, Aharon was the second Bachelor in HaRavak, the Israeli version of The Bachelor.

Aharon became engaged to Shir Rosenblum in 2015, a union of which his mother, Tzipporah, did not approve. After they broke up, he met accessories designer Natalie Levi (or Levy), whom he married in 2018. Shortly afterward, Levi gave birth to a daughter, Renee (or Rena), but by June 2020, their marriage was on the verge of divorce, as Levi also did not get along with Aharon's mother, as well as his manager. They reconciled, and in August 2021, announced they were expecting their second child, a daughter, who was born in January 2022 and named Tamar.

== Discography ==
=== Albums ===
Date released	Title	Transliteration	English translation	Notes
November 2007	אהבה ראשונה	Ahava Rishona	First Love	60,000 Mobile legal downloads
July 2009	הכל זה מלמעלה	HaKol Zeh Milemala	It's All From Heaven	Sales over 80,000 copies
August 2010	מילים פשוטות	Milim Pshutot	Simple Words	Double Platinum Album – Sales over 150,000 copies
December 2011	אין כמו אהבה	Ein Kmo Ahava	There's Nothing Like Love	Platinum Album – Sales over 120,000 copies
June 2012	גיבור	Gibor	Hero	Platinum Album – Sales over 80,000 copies
September 2013	ימים טובים	Yamim Tovim	Good Days	Platinum Album – Sales over 60,000 copies
June 2015	טרמינל 3	Terminal 3	Terminal 3	
May 2019	השמחה שלנו	HaSimha Shelanu	Our Joy	

== See also ==
- Music of Israel
