= Meishar =

Moshav in central Israel

Meishar: מֵישָׁר (Hebrew)
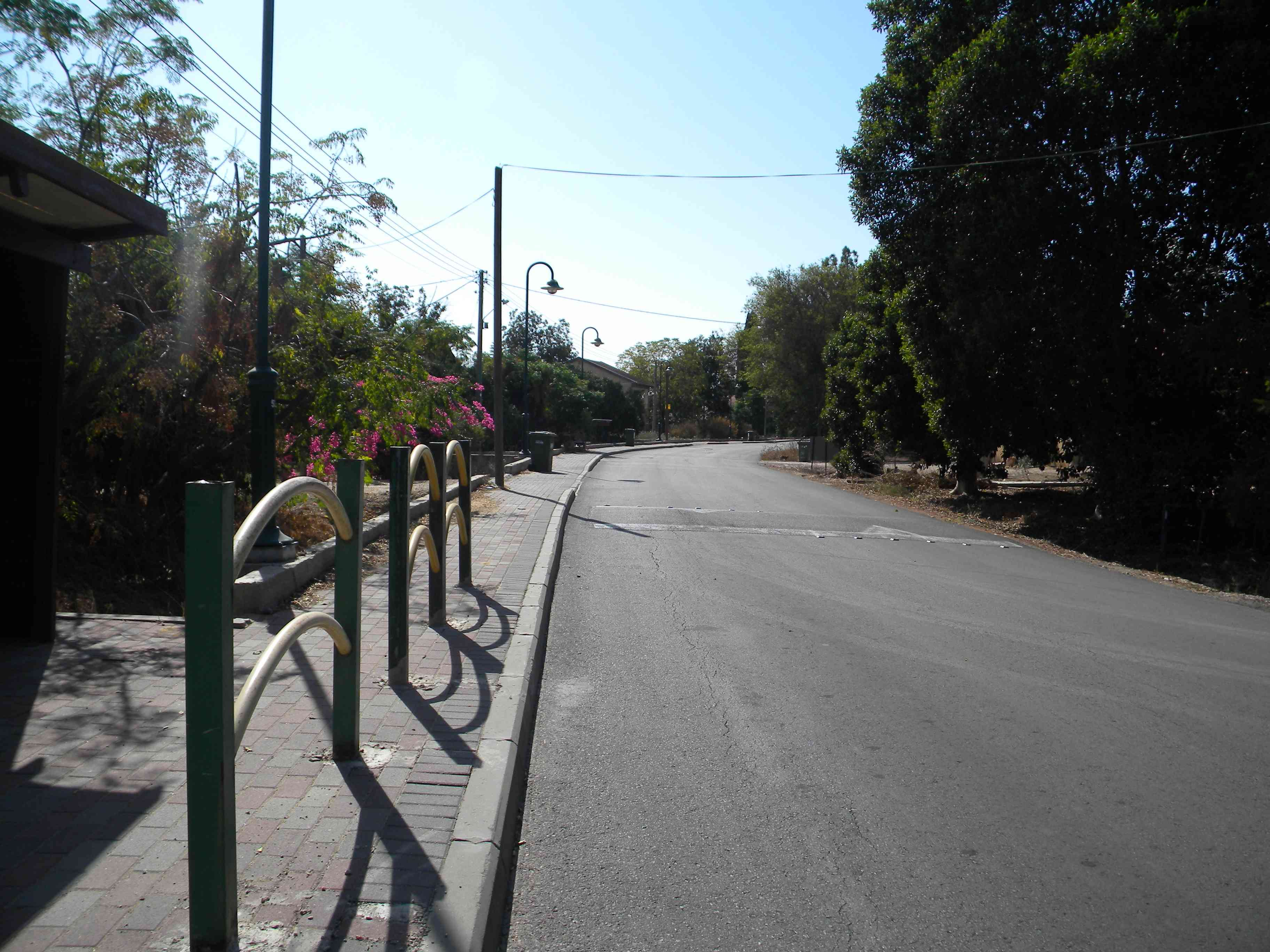
- Etymology: Flatland
- Location within Central Israel Location within Israel
- Coordinates: 31°49′6″N 34°45′15″E
- Country: Israel
- District: Central
- Subdistrict: Rehovot
- Council: Gederot
- Affiliation: Agricultural Union
- Founded: 1950
- Founder: Immigrants from Europe
- Population (2024): 755

Meishar (Hebrew: מֵישָׁר) is a moshav in south-central Israel. Located in the coastal plain near Gedera, it falls under the jurisdiction of Gederot Regional Council. In 2024 it had a population of 755.

== History ==
The moshav was founded in 1950, by immigrants from Poland and Germany, on land near the depopulated Palestinian village of Bashshit.
