= Bashshit =

Former village in present-day Israel

Bashshayt بشيت Beshshayt, Beit Shayt
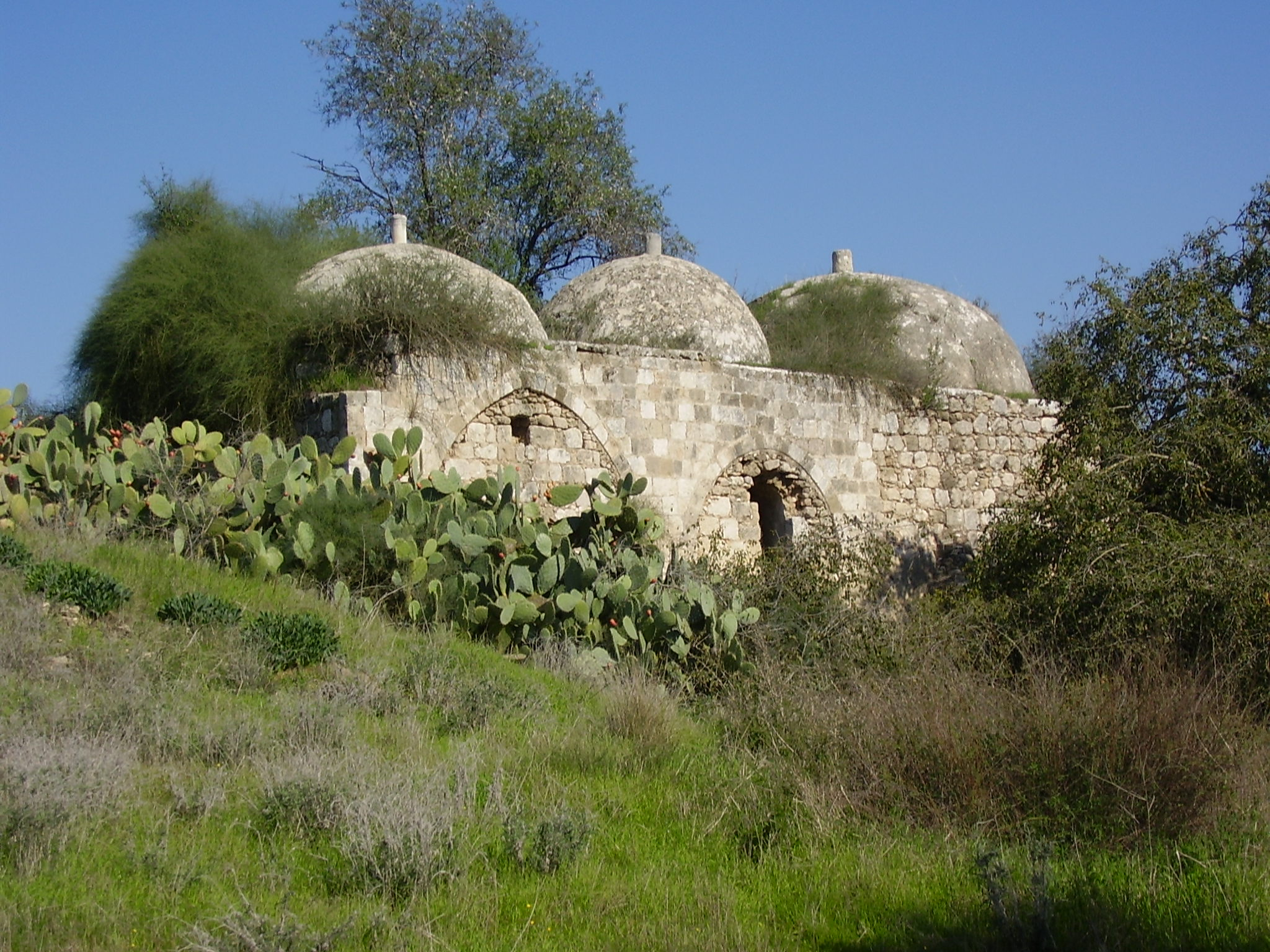
- The tomb of Neby Shayt ("prophet Seth"). Its location is labeled "M" in the 1940s map below; it is currently in a park in the center of Aseret.
- Etymology: "House of Seth"
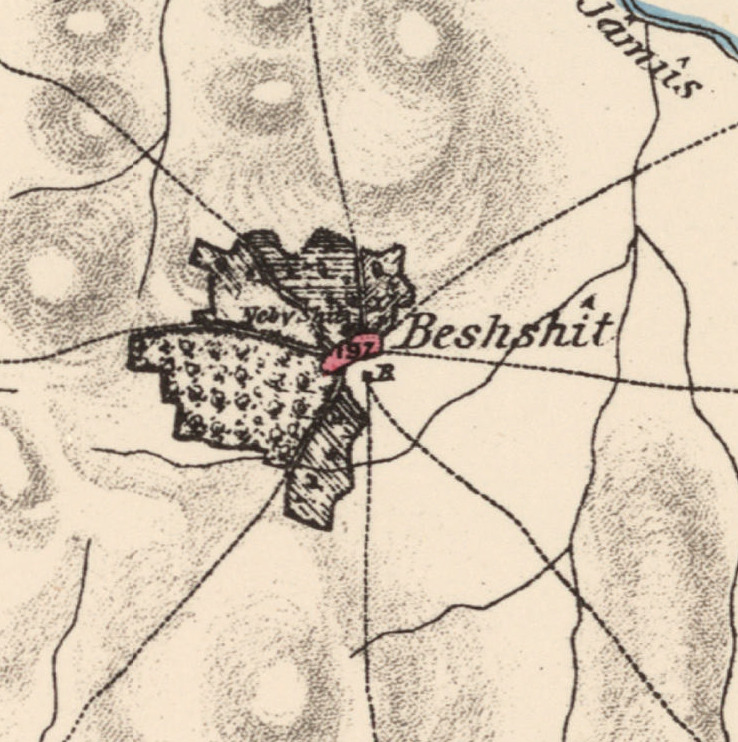
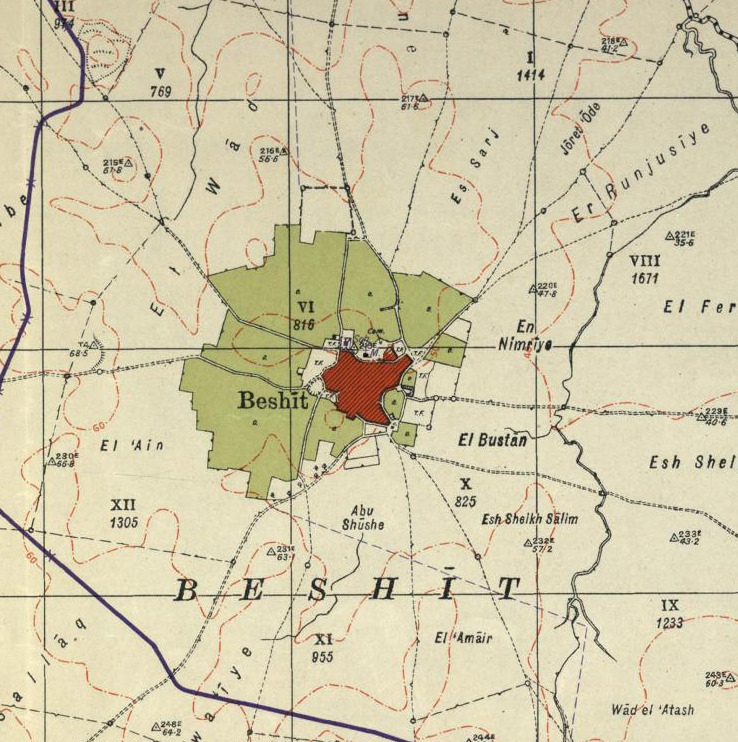
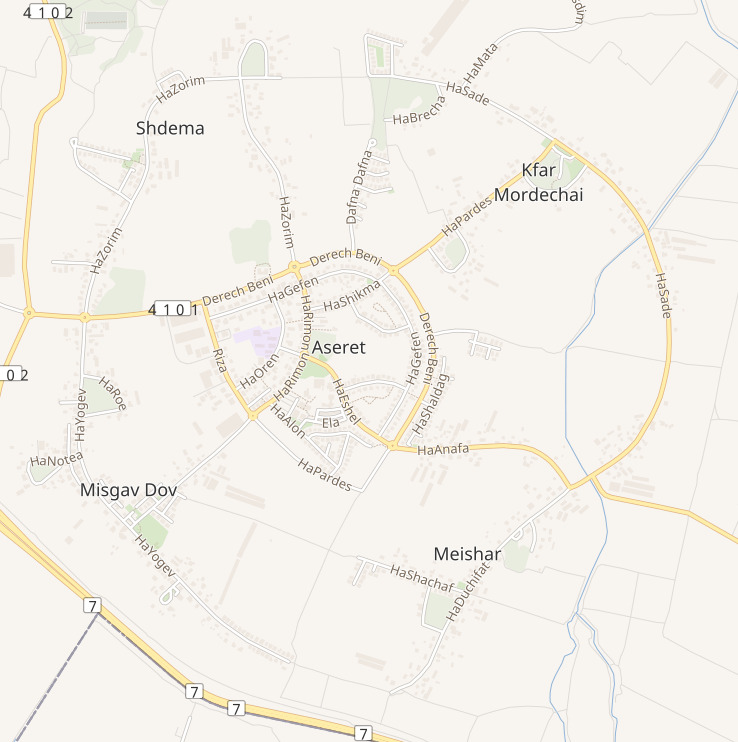
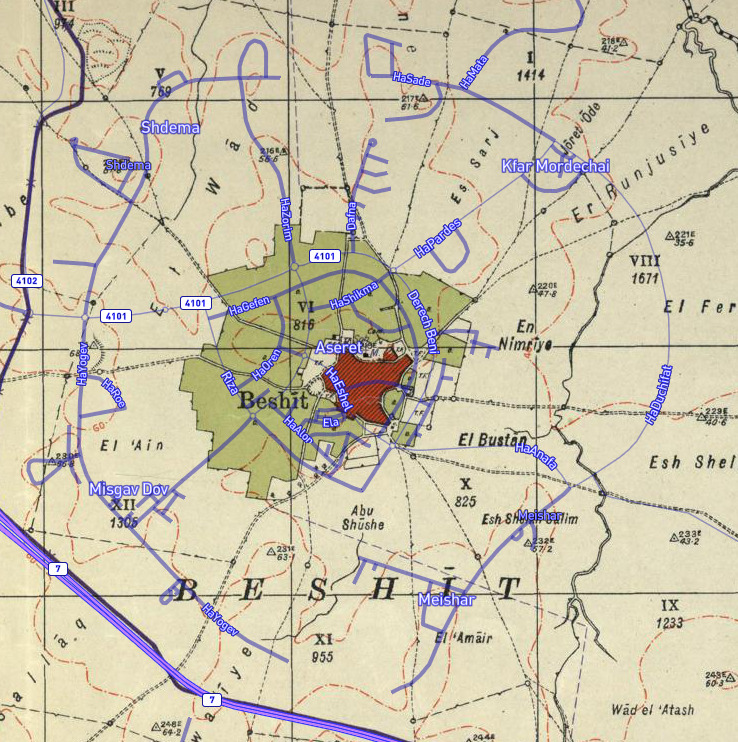
- 1870s map 1940s map modern map 1940s with modern overlay map A series of historical maps of the area around Bashshit (click the buttons)

- Location within Mandatory Palestine
- Coordinates: 31°49′27″N 34°44′56″E
- Palestine grid: 126/136
- Geopolitical entity: Mandatory Palestine
- Subdistrict: Ramle
- Date of depopulation: May 13, 1948

Area
  - Total: 18.6 km^{2} (7.2 sq mi)

Population (1945)
  - Total: 1,620
- Cause(s) of depopulation: Military assault by Yishuv forces
- Current Localities: Neve Mivtah Meshar, Kfar Mordechai, Misgav Dov, Kannot, Shedema, and Aseret.

Bashshayt (Arabic: بشيت), also Beshshayt, was an Arab village in the Ramle Subdistrict, located 16.5 kilometers (10.3 mi) southwest of Ramla about half a mile from wadi Bashshit. Archaeological artifacts from the village attest to habitation in the Early Islamic period and 12th and 13th centuries. Mentioned by Arab geographers from the 13th century onward, there was a tomb for the Neby Shayt ("prophet Seth") in the village.

Like much of the rest of Palestine, Bashshayt was ruled by the Crusaders, Mamluks, Ottomans and the British. It was depopulated at the beginning of the 1948 Palestine war during Operation Barak. Along with the villages of Barqa, Bayt Daras, al-Batani al-Sharqi, and al-Maghar, among others, Bashshayt was attacked by Haganah's Givati Brigade. Following its depopulation, Bashshayt was mostly destroyed. There are seven Israeli localities now situated on what were the village lands.

== Etymology ==
According to the Palestine Exploration Fund, Beshshayt stands for Beit Shayt, meaning "house of Seth. The tomb of Neby Shit ("prophet Seth") was in Bashshayt, and other sanctuaries for him in the region included one in Samaria (Haram en Neby Shayt), as well as Al-Nabi Shayth further north in Lebanon. The tomb lies within a triple-domed mosque of the same name located on the side of a hill that lay in the center of the former village.

== History ==
Pottery remains from the early Islamic era and a coin from the Umayyad era (697–750 CE) have been found here, together with pottery remains from the 12th–13th centuries CE.

During the Crusader period in Palestine, Bashshayt was referred to as Basit. It is documented in the writings of Yaqut al-Hamawi (died 1228) who mentioned it in his Mu'jam, describing its proximity to al-Ramla.

Coins from the Mamluk era (14th century CE) have been found here.

=== Ottoman era ===
Ibn al-Imad al-Hanbali gave an account of the village in the 17th century, noting that the Arab scholar Jamal al-Bashshiti (d.1417) was from the village.

In 1838 it was noted as a village, Beshayt, in the Gaza district.

In May 1863 Victor Guérin found the village to have 350 inhabitants, surrounded by tobacco fields, while an Ottoman village list of about 1870 showed that Bashshit had a population of 159, with a total of 57 houses, though the population count included men only. It was also noted that the name came from "House of Seth".

In the late 19th century, while under Ottoman rule, Bashshayt was an important village between Yibna and Isdud. The village structures in Bashshit were made of adobe bricks. There were cultivated gardens with cactus hedges, and on a hill, stood a three-domed shrine.

At the end of WWI there apparently was some fighting in/around Bashshayt, as used ammunition dating from that era have been found. The New Zealand Mounted Rifles Brigade operated in the area in 1917.

=== British Mandate era ===
During the British Mandate period, Bashshayt had an elementary school, built in 1921, in which 148 students were enrolled in the mid-1940s. The village had a mosque and several artesian wells. Most of the residents were farmers.

In the 1922 census of Palestine conducted by the British Mandate authorities, Bashayt had a population of 936; all Muslims, increasing in the 1931 census to 1,125, still all Muslims, in a total of 333 houses.

Between August and October 1942 the Anders' Army ran its Junacka Szkoła Kadetów (JSK), a Young Soldiers Batalion, in Bashshit, before it moved to Qastina.

By 1945, the population had increased to 1,620, the population being entirely Arab in ethnicity. The village comprised a total area of 18,553 dunums.

A large number of inhabitants were employed in cereal farming, which occupied most of the land area. Some land was also allocated for irrigation and plantation, and the growing of citrus fruits and olives.

Types of land use in dunams by Arabs in the 1945 statistics:

Land Usage	Dunams
Citrus	66
Irrigated & Plantation	651
Olives	67
Cereal	17,558
Urban	58
Cultivable	18,275
Non-cultivable	220

The land ownership of the village before occupation in dunams:

Owner	Dunams
Arab	18,538
Jewish	0
Public	15
Total	18,553

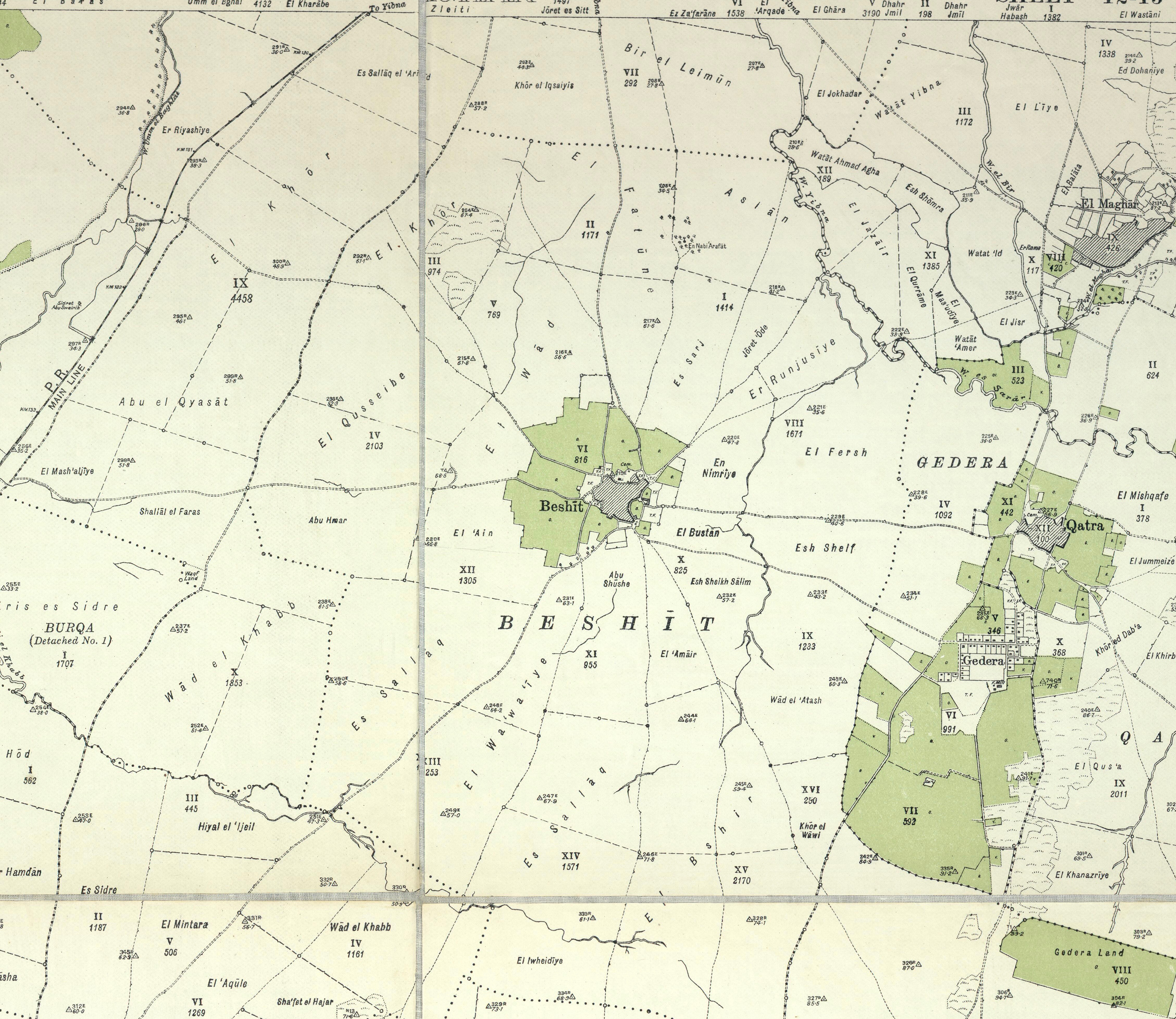
Bashshayt 1930 1:20,000

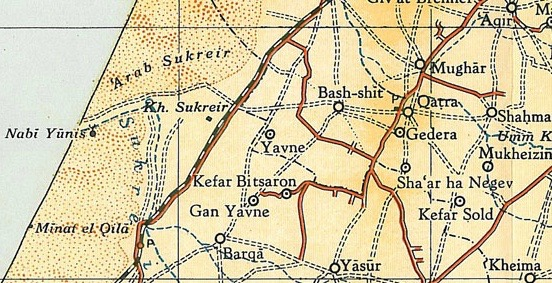
Bashshayt 1945 1:250,000

=== 1948 War and aftermath ===
Between May 10 and May 13, 1948, the village was attacked by the 52nd and 53rd battalions of the Givati Brigade as part of Operation Barak. The villagers put up a major struggle, but the houses were mostly all destroyed.

Today, there are seven Israeli settlements on the village land, including Newe Mivtach, Meshar, Kfar Mordechai, Misgav Dov, Kannot, Shedema, and Aseret. Of Bashshayt's former structures, three houses and a pool remain; two of the houses are deserted and an Israeli family occupies one. The surrounding lands today are cultivated by Israelis for agricultural production.

The village contains an archaeological site, al-Nabi 'Ararat, which has some remaining pillars and cisterns. However, the site is fenced off and marked as a "dangerous building" and the cisterns are heavily populated with bats. The remains of a courtyard in front of the khirbat ("ruins") is heavily overgrown with weeds.

== Excavations ==
In 1999, the village became subject of an archaeological investigation by the Israel Antiquities Authority. The excavation, directed by T. Kanias, with the assistance of A. Hajian (surveying), R. Graff (drafting) and M. Saltzberger (photography) involved the excavation of the sewer line which revealed building remains and ceramic fragments from the Early Islamic period and the 12th–13th centuries CE. Various sized kurkar stones were discovered 0.9 m below the surface, pottery fragments from the Early Islamic period and a few animal bones. Numerous potsherds were excavated also dating to the 12th–13th centuries CE, including the foot of a clay box lined with chalk and decorated with a geometric pattern and the remains of a plaster floor.

A salvage excavation in 2016 revealed remains from the Umayyad, Mamluk and Ottoman era.

== Bibliography ==
- Barron, J.B., ed. (1923). Palestine: Report and General Abstracts of the Census of 1922. Government of Palestine.
- Conder, C.R. (1877). "The Moslem Mukam". Quarterly Statement - Palestine Exploration Fund. 9 (3): 89–103. doi:10.1179/peq.1877.9.3.89.
- Conder, C.R.; Kitchener, H.H. (1882). The Survey of Western Palestine: Memoirs of the Topography, Orography, Hydrography, and Archaeology. Vol. 2. London: Committee of the Palestine Exploration Fund.
- Elad, Itai (2017-07-09). "Bashshit Final Report" (129). Hadashot Arkheologiyot – Excavations and Surveys in Israel.
- Government of Palestine, Department of Statistics (1945). Village Statistics, April, 1945.
- Guérin, V. (1869). Description Géographique Historique et Archéologique de la Palestine (in French). Vol. 1: Judee, pt. 2. Paris: L'Imprimerie Nationale.
- Hadawi, S. (1970). Village Statistics of 1945: A Classification of Land and Area ownership in Palestine. Palestine Liberation Organization Research Center.
- Hartmann, M. (1883). "Die Ortschaftenliste des Liwa Jerusalem in dem türkischen Staatskalender für Syrien auf das Jahr 1288 der Flucht (1871)". Zeitschrift des Deutschen Palästina-Vereins. 6: 102–149.
- Kanias, Tzach (2004-05-31). "Bashshit Final Report" (116). Hadashot Arkheologiyot – Excavations and Surveys in Israel.
- Khalidi, W. (1992). All That Remains: The Palestinian Villages Occupied and Depopulated by Israel in 1948. Washington D.C.: Institute for Palestine Studies. ISBN 0-88728-224-5.
- Le Strange, G. (1890). "Palestine Under the Moslems: A Description of Syria and the Holy Land from A.D. 650 to 1500". Committee of the Palestine Exploration Fund.
- Mills, E., ed. (1932). Census of Palestine 1931. Population of Villages, Towns and Administrative Areas. Jerusalem: Government of Palestine.
- Morris, B. (2004). The Birth of the Palestinian Refugee Problem Revisited. Cambridge University Press. ISBN 978-0-521-00967-6.
- Palmer, E.H. (1881). The Survey of Western Palestine: Arabic and English Name Lists Collected During the Survey by Lieutenants Conder and Kitchener, R. E. Transliterated and Explained by E.H. Palmer. Committee of the Palestine Exploration Fund.
- Petersen, Andrew (2002). A Gazetteer of Buildings in Muslim Palestine: (British Academy Monographs in Archaeology). Vol. I. Oxford University Press. ISBN 978-0-19-727011-0.
- Robinson, E.; Smith, E. (1841). Biblical Researches in Palestine, Mount Sinai and Arabia Petraea: A Journal of Travels in the year 1838. Vol. 3. Boston: Crocker & Brewster.
- Socin, A. (1879). "Alphabetisches Verzeichniss von Ortschaften des Paschalik Jerusalem". Zeitschrift des Deutschen Palästina-Vereins. 2: 135–163.
- Stewardson, Henry C., ed. (1888). The Survey of Western Palestine, Index. Committee of the Palestine Exploration Fund.
