= Kfar Mordechai =

Moshav in central Israel

Kfar Mordechai: כְּפַר מָרְדְּכַי (Hebrew)
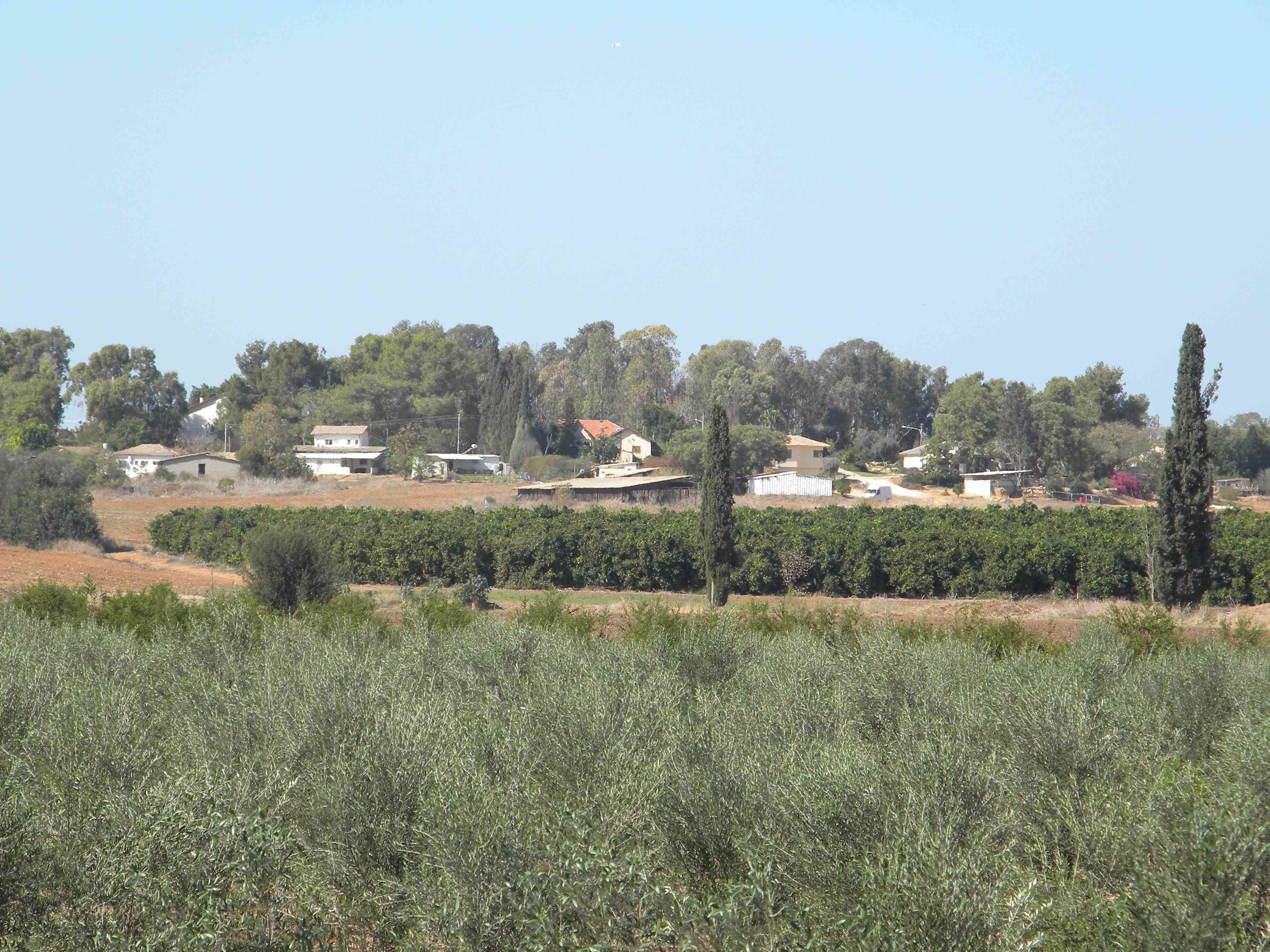

- Location within Central Israel Location within Israel
- Coordinates: 31°49′52″N 34°45′25″E
- Country: Israel
- District: Central
- Subdistrict: Rehovot
- Council: Gederot
- Affiliation: Agricultural Union
- Founded: 26 June 1939
- Population (2024): 666

Kfar Mordechai (Hebrew: כְּפַר מָרְדְּכַי) is a moshav in central Israel. Located about 30 kilometers south of Tel Aviv, between Ashdod, Gedera and Yavne, it falls under the jurisdiction of Gederot Regional Council. In 2024 it had a population of 666.

== History ==
The village was established in 1950 by British and South African Jews and by some ex-kibbutz members, on lands near the depopulated Palestinian village of Bashshit. It was named after Mordechai Eliash (1892-1950), who was born in Ukraine, educated at universities in Berlin and Oxford, immigrated to Palestine in 1919, was a lawyer and the first Israeli ambassador to the United Kingdom.

When the first residents arrived, they discovered that the houses had not yet been built and they were housed in semi-detached huts (tzrifim) consisting of one large room, one kitchen and one toilet located about a kilometer from their allocated farms. After waiting for a year for Rassco to build their new homes, an agreement was reached with Rassco to supply the materials for residents to build their own homes.

In the 1950s the members of the village engaged in agriculture and field crops. In the sixties, many orchards and plantations were planted and a small part of the residents found their livelihood outside the village.

In 1959, the first swimming pool in the Shfella region was established in Kfar Mordechai. This pool was an attraction for all surrounding towns and cities. In order to increase the sources of income, the members of the village opened a camp for learning English in the summer months. The summer camp children were hosted in the residents' homes in the evenings.

Today the village has about 56 farms and about 150 private houses. A small part of the villagers are still engaged in agriculture, which mainly includes orchards and chicken coops. Most of the residents find their livelihood outside the village.

== Notable residents ==
- Agi Mishol
