= Kfar Aviv =

Moshav in central Israel

Kfar Aviv: כְּפַר אָבִיב (Hebrew)
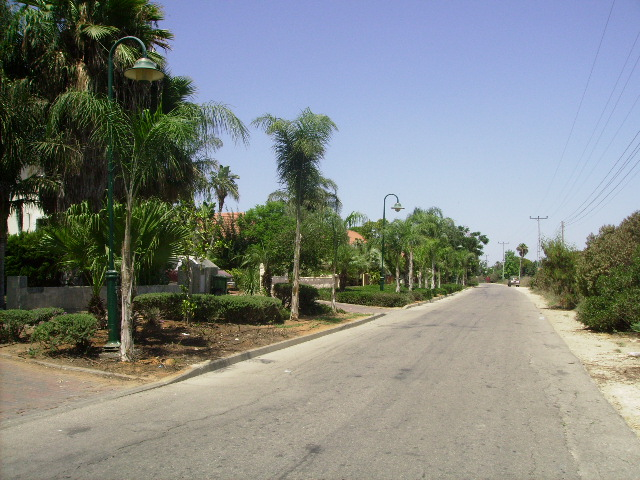

- Location within Central Israel Location within Israel
- Coordinates: 31°49′53″N 34°43′17″E
- Country: Israel
- District: Central
- Subdistrict: Rehovot
- Council: Gederot
- Affiliation: Agricultural Union
- Founded: 1951
- Founder: Egyptian Jewish immigrants and refugees
- Population (2024): 775

Kfar Aviv (Hebrew: כְּפַר אָבִיב, lit. Village of Spring) is a moshav in the Central District of Israel, near Ashdod. It belongs to the Gederot Regional Council. In 2024 it had a population of 775.

== History ==
Kfar Aviv was founded in 1952 by the Jewish Agency on lands near the former Palestinian village of Yibna. The settlement was intended to absorb Jewish immigrants and refugees from Egypt. Its original name was Kfar HaYeor (Hebrew: כפר היאור; lit. Village of the Nile). The name "Kfar Aviv" was given as a reference to the Exodus of the Jews from Egypt, which occurred in spring as recorded in the Torah (Exodus 34:18). As time passed, the village absorbed families from Poland.

The land area used for farming covers about 2,000 dunams. Most inhabitants of the village work elsewhere.
