= Gederot Regional Council =

Regional council in Central Israel

Coordinates: 31°48′N 34°42′E

Gederot גדרות
- Regional council (from 1953)
- Interactive map of Gederot
- Country: Israel
- District: Central
- Subdistrict: Rehovot
- Natural region: Rehovot

Government
  - Head of Municipality: Eran Glazer

Area
  - Total: 13,710 dunams (13.71 km^{2}; 5.29 sq mi)

Population (2024)
  - Total: 5,112
  - Density: 372.9/km^{2} (965.7/sq mi)
- Website: www.gderot.muni.il

Gederot Regional Council (Hebrew: מועצה אזורית גדרות, Mo'atza Azorit Gderot) is a regional council in the Central District of Israel. It is located between Ashdod, Yavne and Gedera and covers an area of 13,000 dunams. Founded in 1953, it was named after a biblical town in the allotment of the tribe of Judah (Joshua 15:41) Its population is 5,112.

It borders on Brenner Regional Council to the north, Hevel Yavne Regional Council to the west, Be'er Tuvia Regional Council and Gan Yavne to the south, and the city of Gedera to the east.

== List of settlements ==
The council includes six moshavim and one community settlement:

- Aseret (community settlement)
- Gan HaDarom (moshav)
- Kfar Aviv (moshav)
- Kfar Mordechai (moshav)
- Meishar (moshav)
- Misgav Dov (moshav)
- Shdema (moshav)

== Demographics ==
Historical population
Year	Pop.	±%
1972	2,100	—
1983	2,500	+19.0%
1995	2,700	+8.0%
2008	4,500	+66.7%
2022	5,008	+11.3%
2024	5,112	+2.1%

== Voting Patterns ==
In the 2022 election, 80 percent of voters in the regional council voted for the parties of the center-left coalition led by Yair Lapid, while 19 percent voted for the parties of the right-wing coalition led by Benjamin Netanyahu and 1 percent voted for the Arab parties.

In the 2026 election, 79 percent of voters in the regional council voted for the parties of the center-left coalition led by Gadi Eisenkot, while 16 percent voted for the parties of the right-wing coalition led by Benjamin Netanyahu and 0.2 percent voted for the Arab parties. An additional 3.1 percent voted for the Reservists, and 1.2 percent voted for Amcha Yisrael. Voter turnout increased 12 percent from the 2022 election.
