= Gan HaDarom =

Moshav in central Israel

Gan HaDarom: גַּן הַדָּרוֹם (Hebrew)
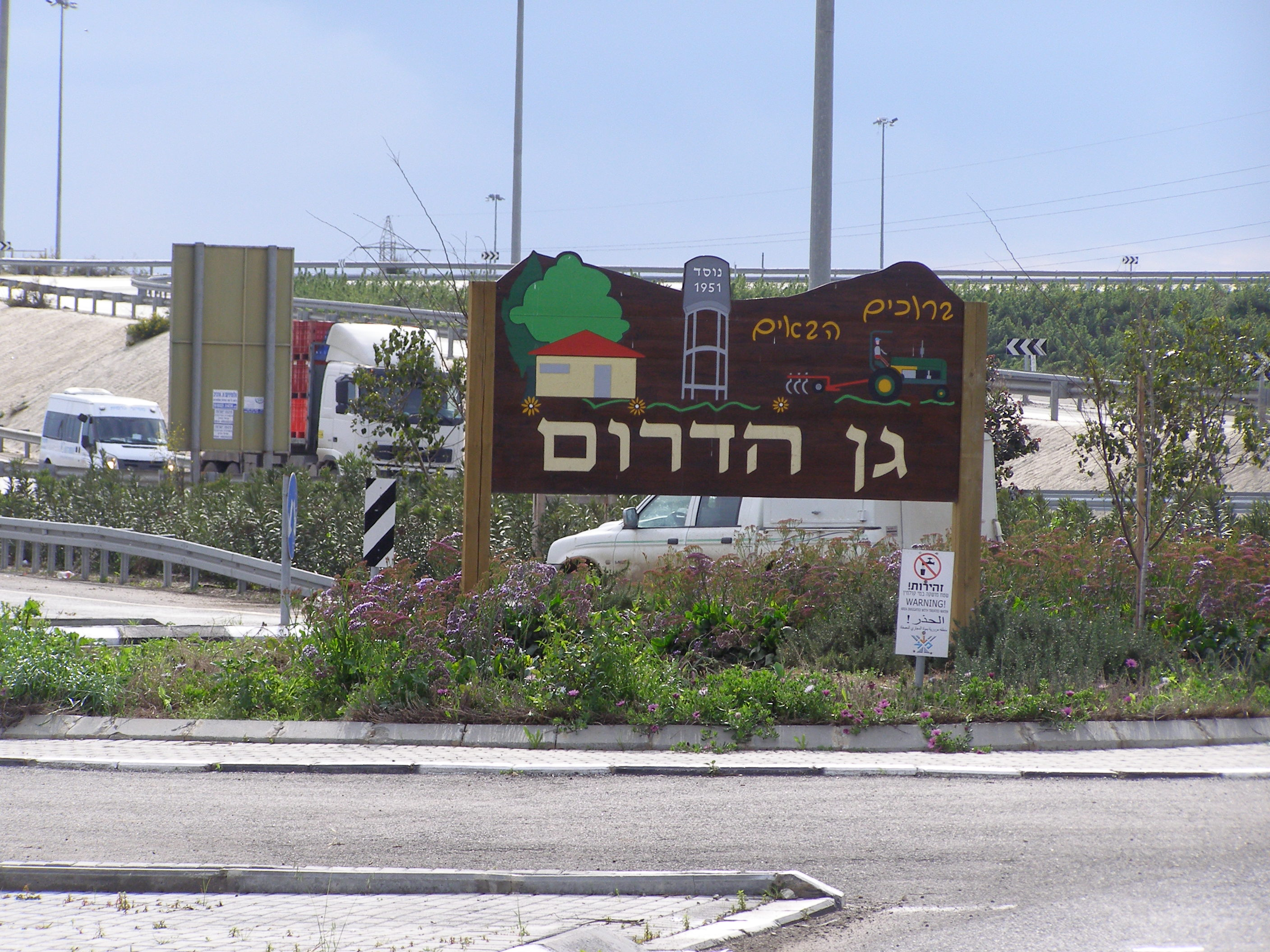

- Location within Central Israel Location within Israel
- Coordinates: 31°48′15″N 34°42′4″E
- Country: Israel
- District: Central
- Subdistrict: Rehovot
- Council: Gederot
- Affiliation: Agricultural Union
- Founded: 1951
- Founder: Iraqi Jews
- Population (2024): 658

Gan HaDarom (Hebrew: גַּן הַדָּרוֹם, lit. Garden of the South) is a moshav in southern Israel. Located on the coastal plain near Ashdod, it falls under the jurisdiction of Gederot Regional Council. In 2024 it had a population of 658.

== History ==
The moshav was founded in 1951 by Jewish refugees from Iraq on Operation Ezra and Nehemiah.

Gan HaDarom was built on land near the Palestinian village of Isdud, which was depopulated in 1948.

The first settlers in Gan HaDarom lived in a ma'abara in neighboring Gan Yavne until the infrastructure was complete for permanent habitation. In 1957–58, twenty new houses were built, and 15 families who arrived from Poland moved into them.

Most residents of the modern moshav make their living by working in nearby cities Ashdod and Yavneh. The minority who work in agriculture mainly cultivate poultry, citrus, avocado, and other fruit and vegetables.
