= Misgav Dov =

Moshav in central Israel

Misgav Dov: משגב דב (Hebrew)
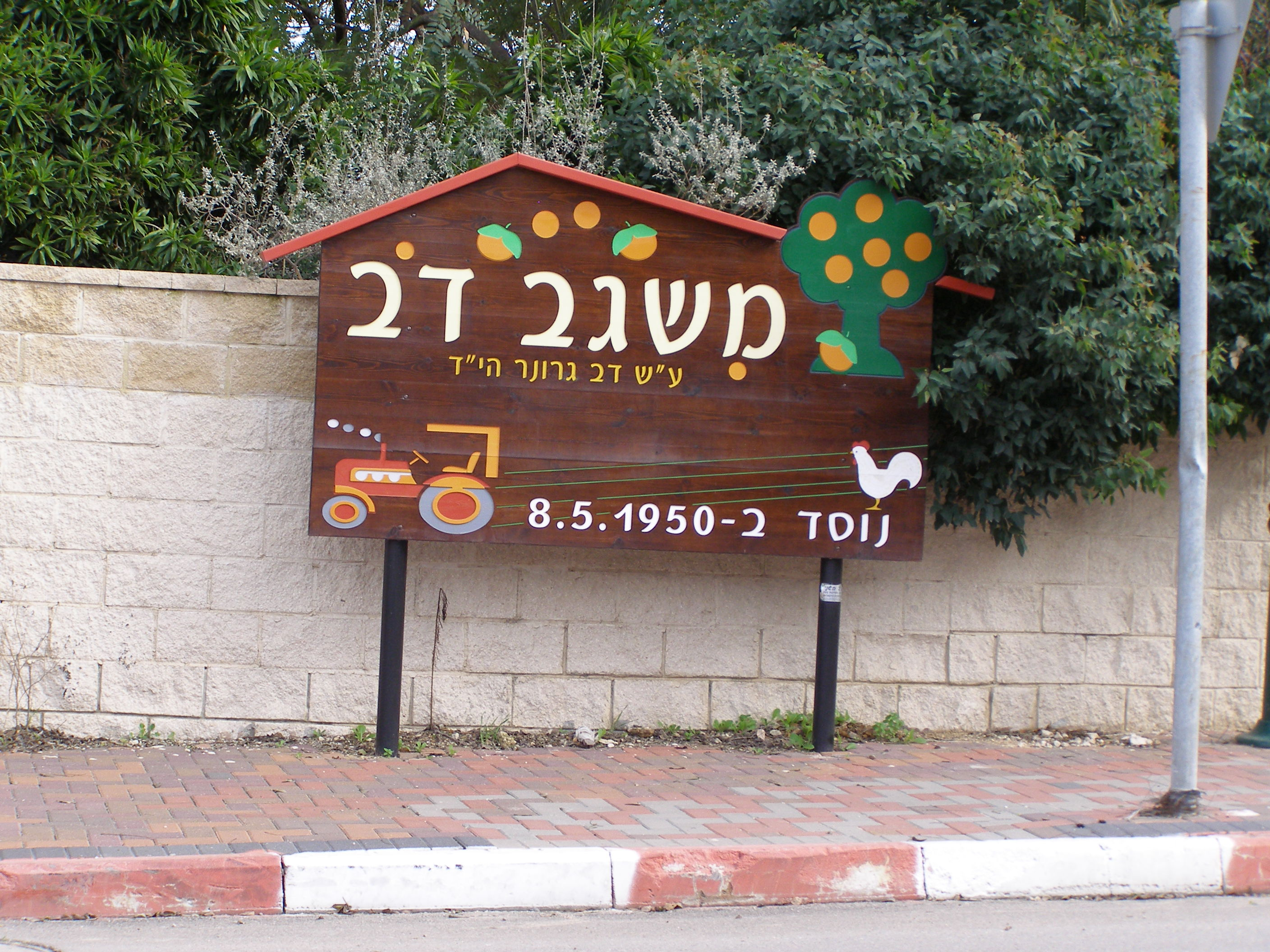

- Location within Central Israel Location within Israel
- Coordinates: 31°49′12″N 34°44′25″E
- Country: Israel
- District: Central
- Subdistrict: Rehovot
- Council: Gederot
- Affiliation: Mishkei Herut Beitar
- Founded: 1950
- Founder: Herut members
- Population (2024): 768

Misgav Dov (Hebrew: מִשְׂגַּב דֹּב, lit. Dov's Fortress) is a moshav in south-central Israel. Located near Gedera in the coastal plain, it falls under the jurisdiction of Gederot Regional Council. In 2024 it had a population of 768.

== History ==
The moshav was founded though the Mishkei Herut Beitar settlement movement by Herut members from Haifa in 1950 on land near the Ottoman-Palestine-Arab village of Bashshit.

It was named after Dov Gruner, a member of the Irgun who was executed by the British authorities. The founders were later joined by new immigrants from Iraq, Poland and the Soviet Union.
