= Mazkeret Batya =

Mazkeret Batya: מַזְכֶּרֶת בַּתְיָה; مزكيرت باتيا
- Local council

Hebrew transcription(s)
  - ISO 259: Mazkert Batya
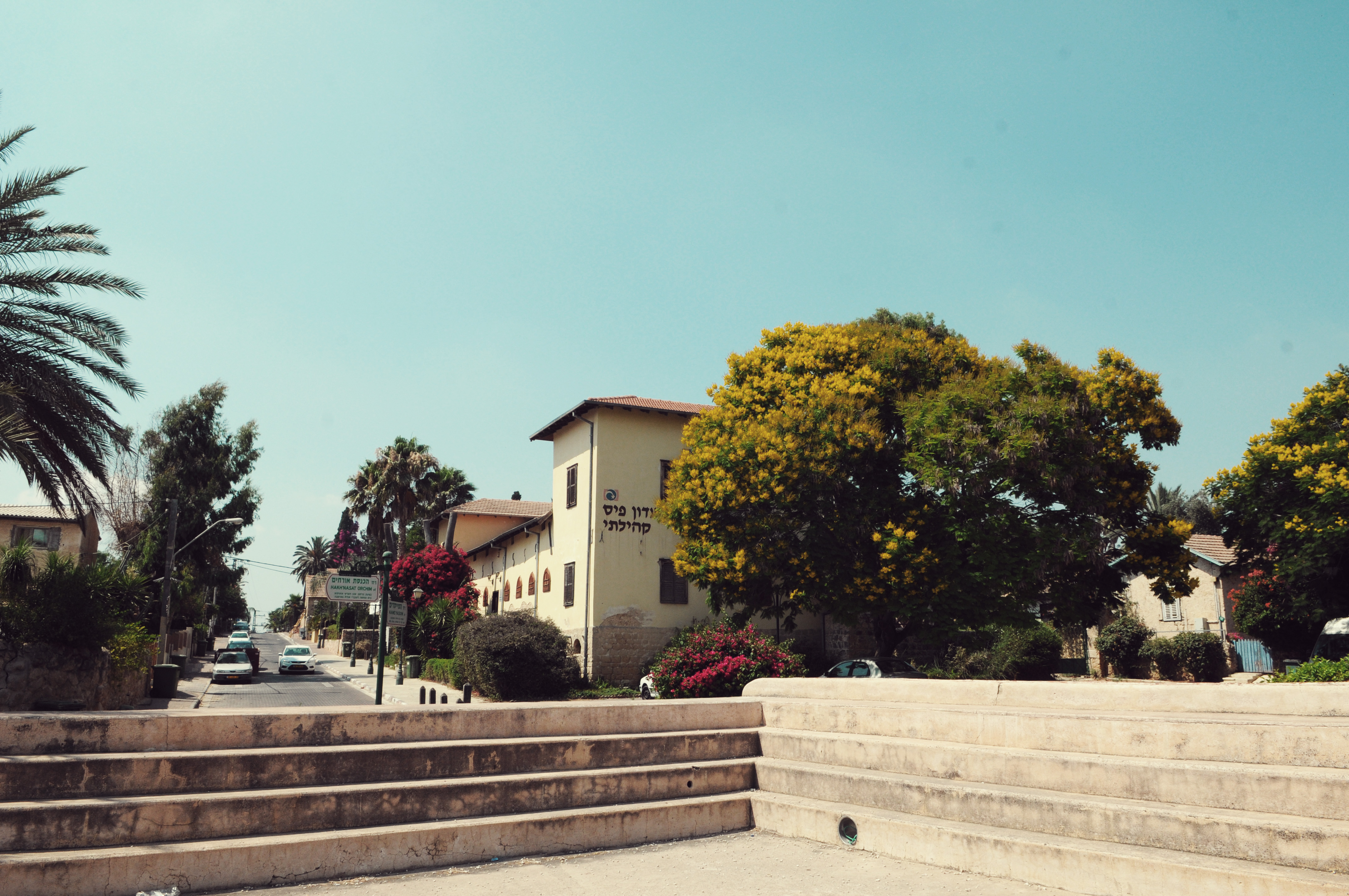

- Location within Central Israel Location within Israel
- Coordinates: 31°50′59″N 34°50′35″E
- Country: Israel
- District: Central
- Subdistrict: Rehovot
- Natural Region: Rehovot
- Founded: 1883; 143 years ago

Government
  - Head of Municipality: Gaby Gaon

Area
  - Total: 7,440 dunams (7.44 km^{2}; 2.87 sq mi)

Population (2024)
  - Total: 16,334
  - Density: 2,200/km^{2} (5,690/sq mi)

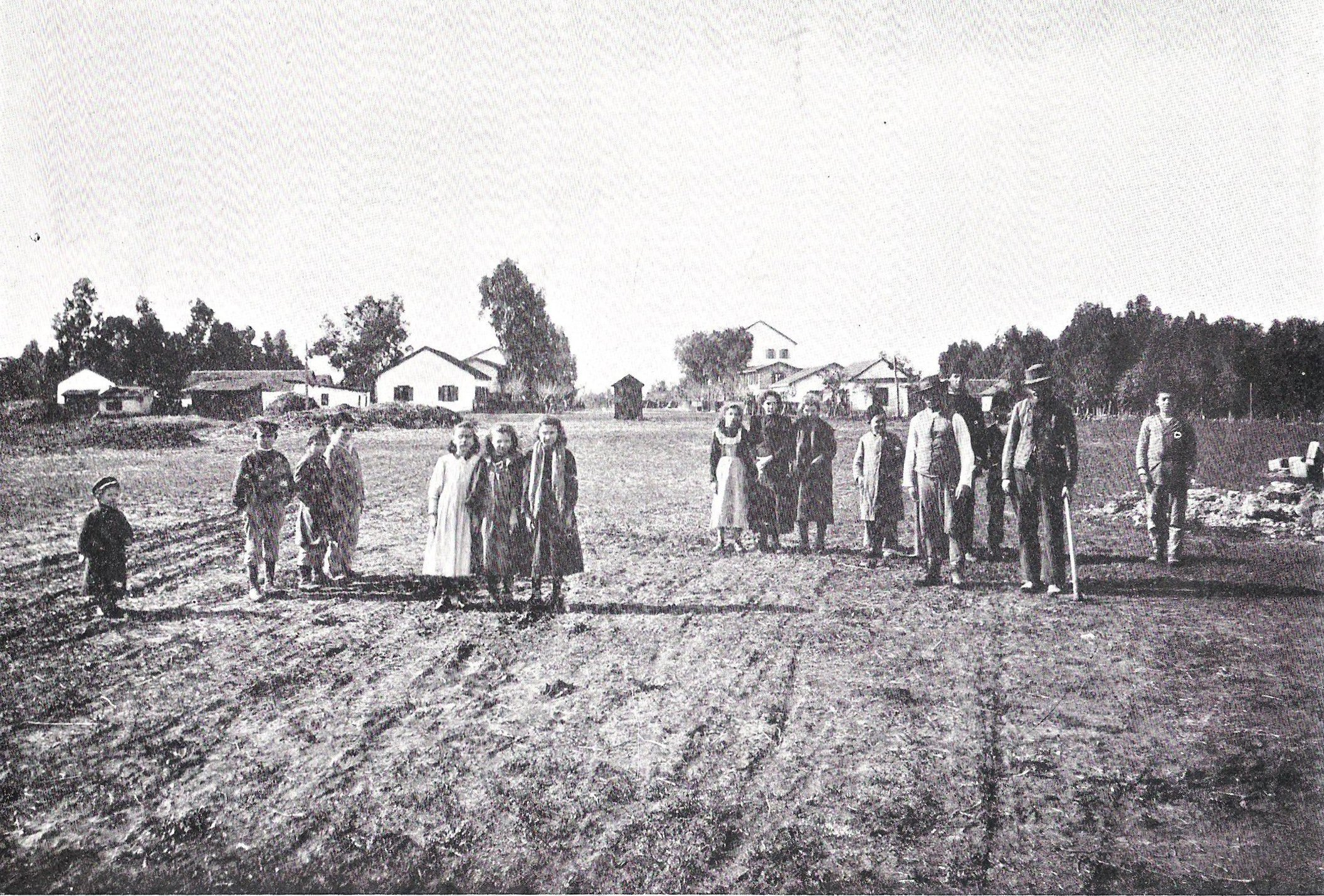
Mazkeret Batya in the early days, c.1899

Mazkeret Batya (Hebrew: מַזְכֶּרֶת בַּתְיָה) (lit. "Batya Memorial") is a local council in central Israel located southeast of Rehovot and 25 kilometres (16 mi) from Tel Aviv. Mazkeret Batya spans an area of 7,440 dunams (7 km^{2}). In 2024 it had a population of 16,334. The mayor of Mazkeret Batya is Gaby Gaon.

== History ==
Mazkeret Batya, initially Ekron, was established on November 7, 1883 by 11 ultra-Orthodox Jewish farmers from Russia, one of them Yaakov Laskovsky. It was the first agricultural settlement of the Hovevei Zion movement.

The land was purchased by Baron Rothschild to promote Jewish agriculture in Israel. Rabbi Shmuel Mohilever was instrumental in mobilizing funding. Mohilever's remains were later reinterred in the Mazkeret Batya cemetery. In 1887 the name was changed to Mazkeret Batya, in memory of Betty Solomon de Rothschild, mother of Baron Edmond James de Rothschild. The history of the founding is described in the book "Rebels in the Holy Land", by the historian Sam Finkle where he writes about the community's struggle to uphold the laws of the sabbatical year despite fierce opposition.

The economy of the village was originally based on dry farming, which continued even after the Mekorot Company constructed a pipeline to bring water from Rehovot. In 1918, Mazkeret Batya had a population of 316 people. In 1947, Mazkeret Batya was home to 475 people.

According to a census conducted in 1922 by the British Mandate authorities, Mazkeret Batya (then Ekron) had a population 368 Jews. During the Mandate era, a Jewish police station was established in Mazkeret Batya to safeguard the local roads. In the War of Independence, convoys to besieged Jerusalem left from Mazkeret Batya. A field hospital operated there to care for Haganah fighters wounded at Latrun.

According to one source, at the end of the British Mandate for Palestine, the British tried to hand the nearby Aqir airfield and camp to the Palestinian Arabs, apparently without success.

Due to its proximity to Tel Aviv, Mazkeret Batya has experienced a growth spurt, becoming a mixed community of religious and secular Jews. Historic landmarks include Beit Ha'Itut (Signal House), the Great Synagogue, Beit Meshek HaBaron ("The Baron's Farmhouse", now housing a cultural center), the saqiya-type water-rising system with its wooden wheels, well and pool, and an old farmyard.

== The Rabbe Mohilever Museum ==
The Rabbi Mohilever Museum in Mazkeret Batya commemorates the legacy of rabbi Shmuel Mohilever, a founder of Religious Zionism who helped found the town. Located in a restored historic building, it showcases interactive exhibits and authentic documents from the first pioneers.

== Voting Patterns ==
In the 2022 election, 57 percent of voters in Mazkeret Batya voted for the parties of the center-left coalition led by Yair Lapid, while 39 percent voted for the parties of the right-wing coalition led by Benjamin Netanyahu and 0.1 percent voted for the Arab parties.

In the 2026 election, 59 percent of voters in Mazkeret Batya voted for the parties of the center-left coalition led by Gadi Eisenkot, while 33 percent voted for the parties of the right-wing coalition led by Benjamin Netanyahu and 0.2 percent voted for the Arab parties. An additional 4.5 percent voted for the Reservists, and 3.4 percent voted for Amcha Yisrael. Voter turnout increased 16 percent from the 2022 election.

== Notable people ==
Shira Elinav, footballer

== Twin towns — sister cities ==
Mazkeret Batya is twinned with:

- Celle, Germany
- Calgary, Alberta, Canada
- Meudon, France
- Memphis, United States
