= Shdema =

Moshav in central Israel

Shdema: שְׁדֵמָה (Hebrew)
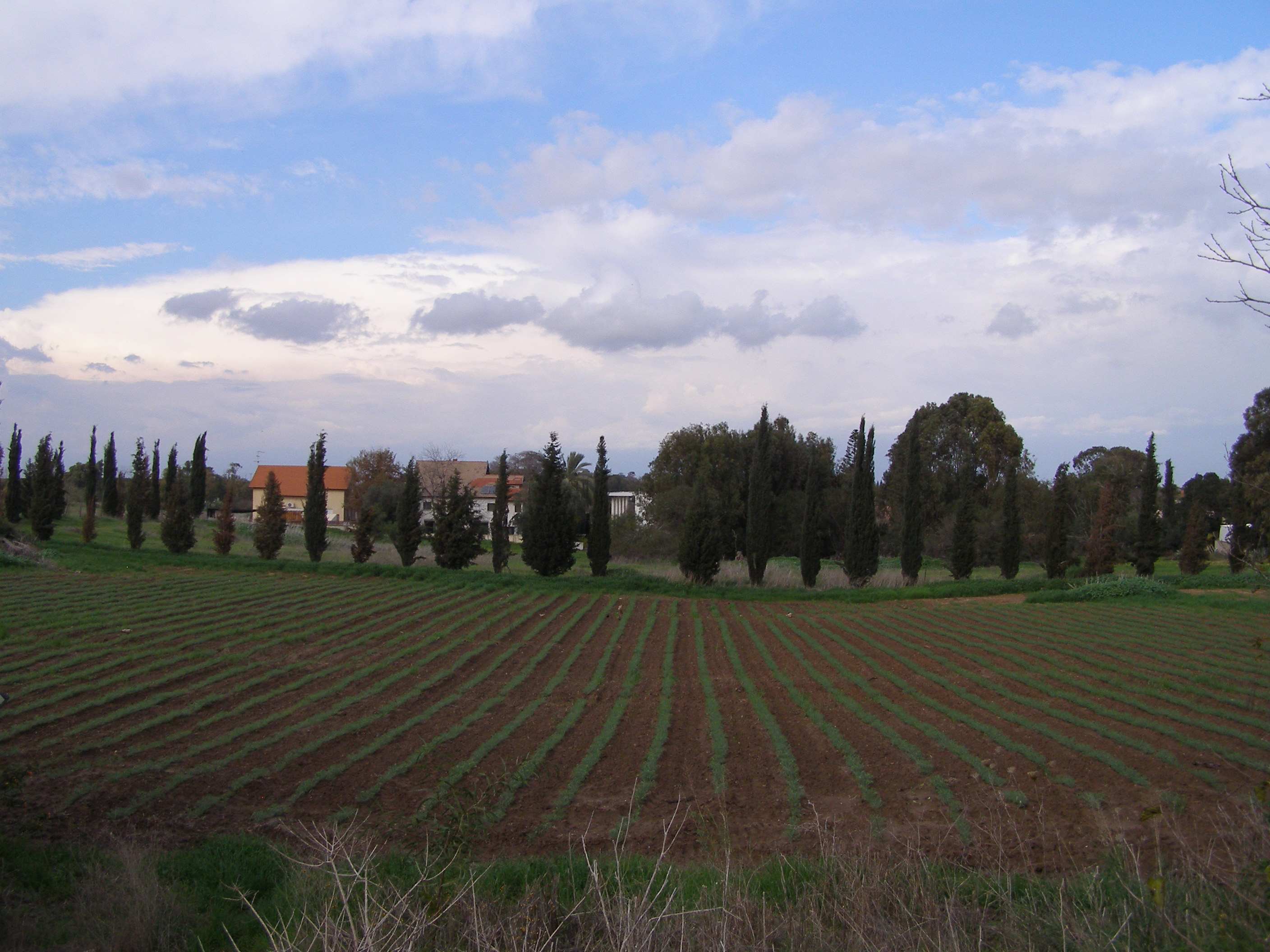

- Location within Central Israel Location within Israel
- Coordinates: 31°49′49″N 34°44′28″E
- Country: Israel
- District: Central
- Subdistrict: Rehovot
- Council: Gederot
- Region: Shephelah
- Founded: 1954
- Founder: Iranian Jews
- Population (2024): 481

Shdema (Hebrew: שְׁדֵמָה) is a moshav in south-central Israel. Located near Gedera in the coastal plain, it falls under the jurisdiction of Gederot Regional Council. In 2024 it had a population of 481.

== History ==
The moshav was founded in 1954 to absorb immigrants to Israel from Iran, on lands near the depopulated Palestinian village of Bashshit. After the group refused to live there, it was populated by urban residents who chose to live an agricultural cooperative lifestyle and arrived as part of the movement "from city to village."

The word "Shdema", which appears infrequently in the Hebrew Bible, means "field of produce". The original name was "Yefe Nof" (Hebrew: יפה נוף).

== Notable people ==
- Avihu Ben-Nun
