= Agricultural Union (Israel) =

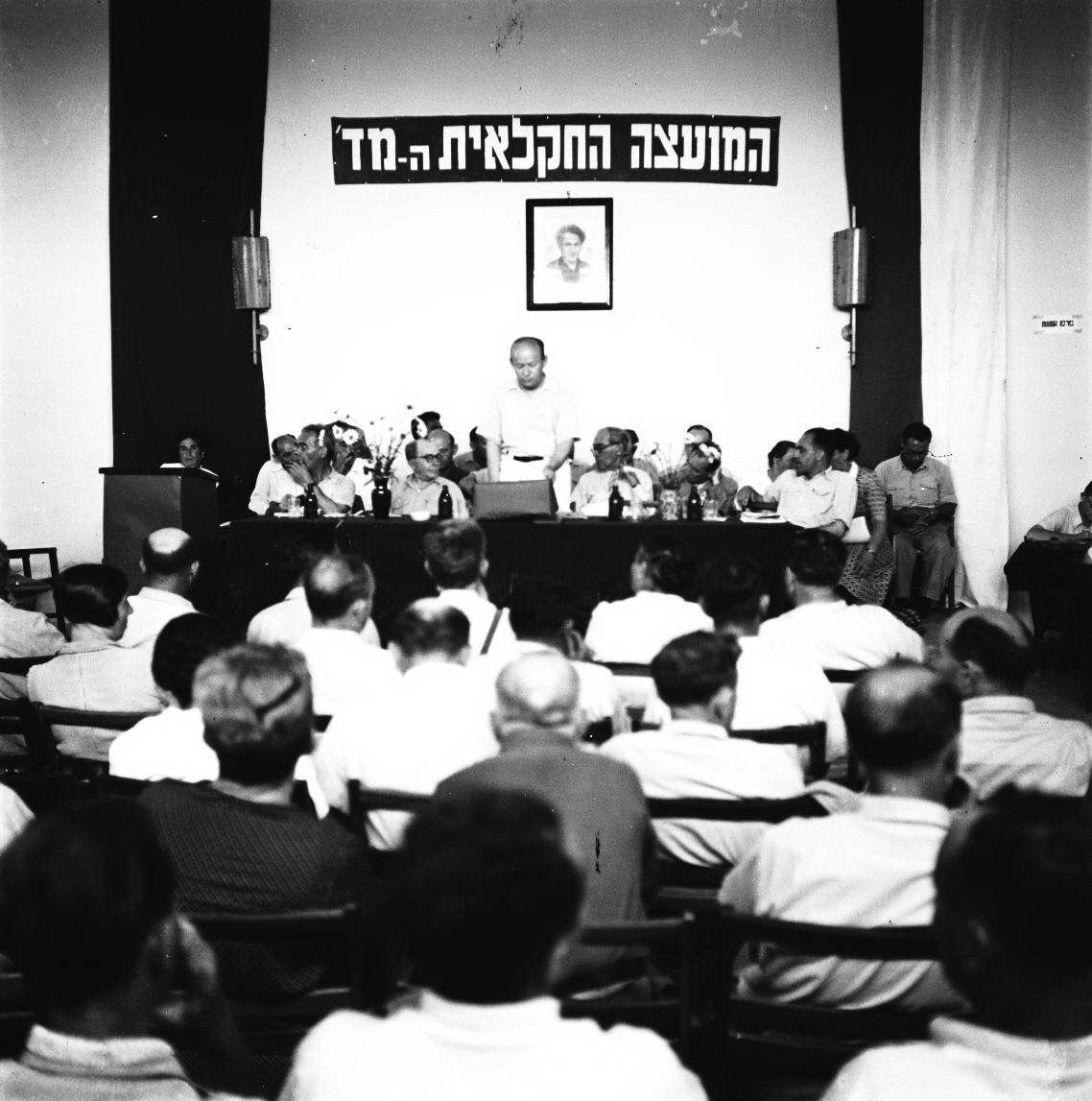
The 44 Agricultural Union Conference

The Agricultural Union (Hebrew: האיחוד החקלאי, HaIhud HaHakla'i) is a settlement movement that supports agricultural settlements in Israel, which includes several moshavim and community settlements. It was established in the early 1960s as a result of the merger of the Agricultural Council of Cooperative Villages with the Moshavim Organization of HaOved HaTzioni. The origins of the settlement movement trace back to the immigrants of the fifth Aliyah in the early 1930s. In 1978 a youth movement by the same name was established, which is one of the twelve youth movements recognized in Israel. The current secretary-general of the settlement movement is Dudu Kochman and the secretary-general of the youth movement is Neta Sisal.

== See also ==
- Agriculture in Israel
