= Rehovot Subdistrict =

Coordinates: 31°54′N 34°49′E

Rehovot Subdistrict נפת רחובות قضاء رحوفوت
- Subdistrict
- Central District in blue, with Rehovot Subdistrict in dark blue
- Interactive map of Rehovot Subdistrict
- Country: Israel
- District: Central

Area
  - Total: 324 km^{2} (125 sq mi)

Population (2024)
  - Total: 648,745

Ethnicity
  - Jews and others: 97.6%
  - Arabs: 0.3%

The Rehovot Subdistrict is one of Israel's subdistricts in Central District. The principal city of the subdistrict is, as the name implies, Rehovot.

== History ==
The subdistrict is composed mostly of the western half of what has been, during Mandatory Palestine, the Ramle Subdistrict.

== Demographics ==
Historical population
Year	Pop.	±%
1972	141,200	—
1983	229,700	+62.7%
1995	343,400	+49.5%
2008	496,370	+44.5%
2022	629,784	+26.9%
2024	648,745	+3.0%

== Administrative local authorities ==
Cities	Local Councils	Regional Councils
Ness Ziona; Rehovot; Rishon LeZion; Yavne	Bnei Ayish; Gan Yavne; Gedera; Kiryat Ekron; Mazkeret Batya	Brenner; Gan Rave; Gederot; Gezer (part); Hevel Yavne; Nahal Sorek

== Voting Patterns ==
In the 2022 election, 51 percent of voters in the subdistrict voted for the parties of the right-wing coalition led by Benjamin Netanyahu, while 49 percent voted for the parties of the center-left coalition led by Yair Lapid. The Arab parties received a mere 0.2 percent of the vote.

In the 2026 election, 49 percent of voters in the subdistrict voted for the parties of the center-left coalition led by Gadi Eisenkot, while 44 percent voted for the parties of the right-wing coalition led by Benjamin Netanyahu and 0.2 percent voted for the Arab parties. An additional 4.3 percent voted for the Reservists, and 2 percent voted for Amcha Yisrael. Voter turnout increased 14 percent from the 2022 election.

== Natural Regions ==
Districts, Subdistricts and Natural Regions of the State of Israel, 2018

- 441 Rehovot
  - Population (2024): 336,065
  - Largest city: Rehovot
- 442 Rishon LeZiyyon
  - Population (2024): 312,680
  - Largest city: Rishon LeZion
