= Zarnuqa =

Depopulated village in Mandatory Palestine

Zarnuqa زرنوقة
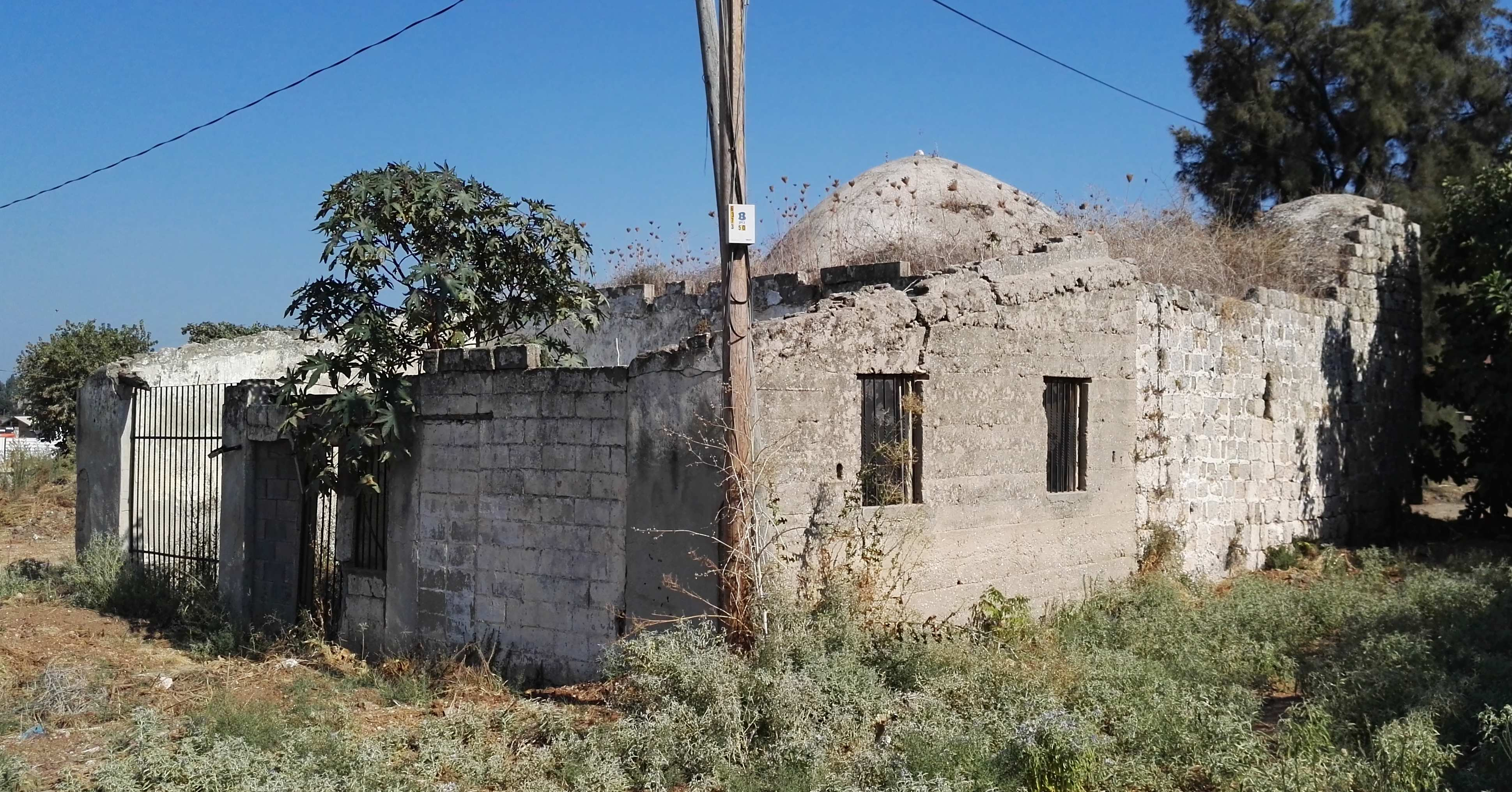
- Village mosque in 2016.
- Etymology: "The rivulet"
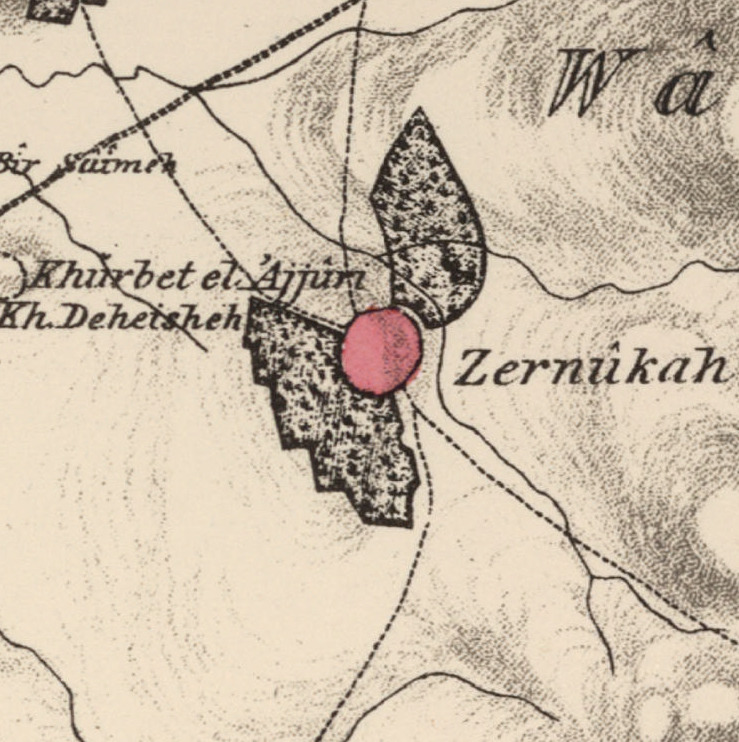
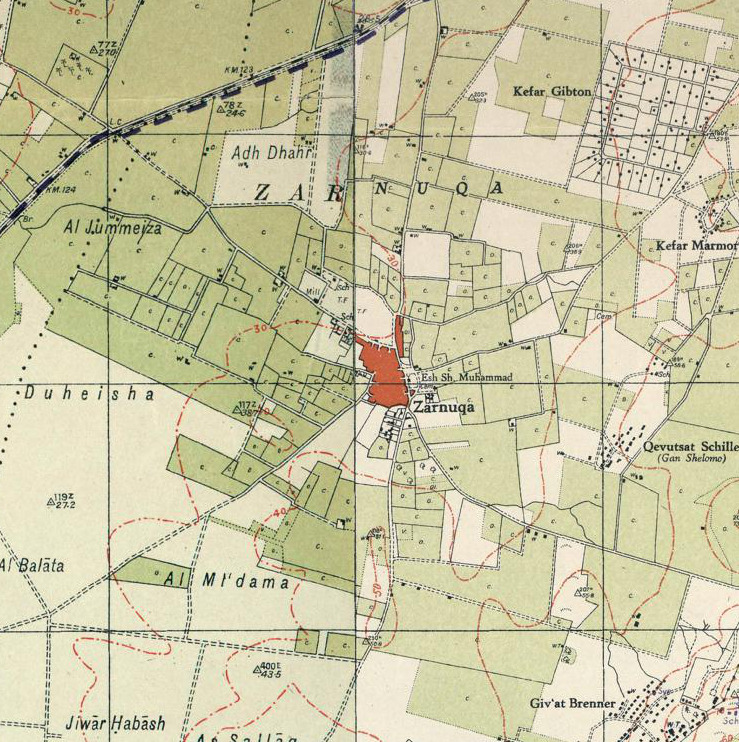
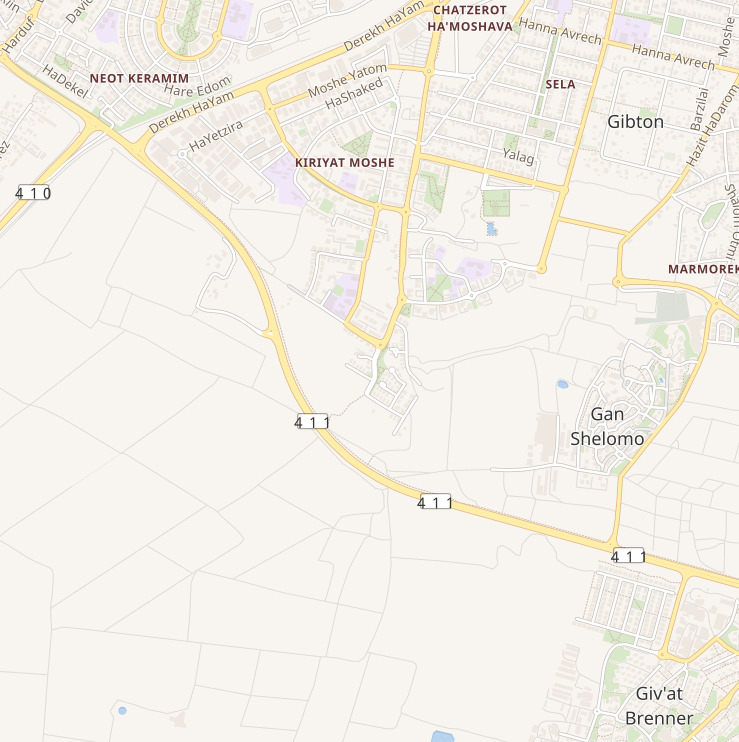
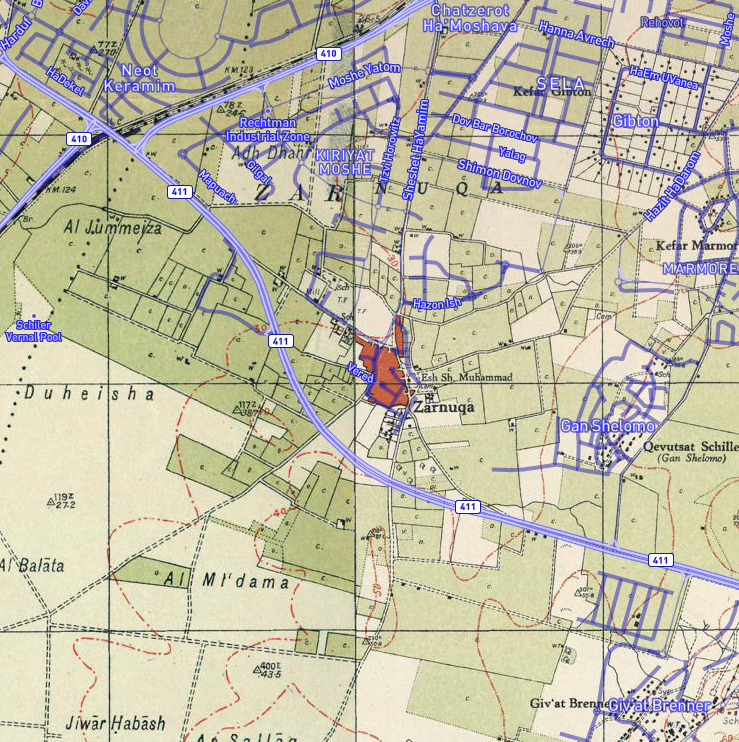
- 1870s map 1940s map modern map 1940s with modern overlay map A series of historical maps of the area around Zarnuqa (click the buttons)

- Location within Mandatory Palestine
- Coordinates: 31°52′47″N 34°47′17″E
- Palestine grid: 130/143
- Geopolitical entity: Mandatory Palestine
- Subdistrict: Ramle
- Date of depopulation: 27–28 May 1948

Area
  - Total: 7,545 dunams (7.545 km^{2}; 2.913 sq mi)

Population (1945)
  - Total: 2,380
- Cause(s) of depopulation: Expulsion by Yishuv forces
- Current Localities: Rehovot, Kvutzat Shiller, Gibton and Givat Brenner

Zarnuqa (Arabic: زرنوقة), also Zarnuga, was a Palestinian Arab village in the Ramle Subdistrict. It was depopulated on 27–28 May 1948 during the 1948 Arab–Israeli War.

== Location ==
Zarnuqa was located 10 km southwest of Ramla.

== History ==
=== Bronze Age to Early Islamic period ===
Ceramics from the Late Bronze Age and the Persian period have been found here.

A building, a winepress and ceramics from the Byzantine period have been found, as have Early Islamic remains.

=== Ottoman period ===
Tombs from the Late Ottoman period have been excavated, as well as a building with a pottery kiln from 18th–19th centuries.

The mosque of the village was built by Shaykh Ahmad al-Rahhal with a poem of two lines inscribed in nashki script dating the construction of the mosque to 1207 H. (1792/93 CE).

Zarnuga appeared as an unnamed village on the map of Pierre Jacotin, compiled in 1799. Under the rule of Ibrahim Pasha of Egypt (1831–1840), Zarnuqa experienced an influx of migrants from Egypt, contributing to demographic growth and shaping aspects of village life. Archaeological findings, including imported Egyptian ballāṣ jars reused in local burials, reflect the material culture ties between the Egyptian settlers and the existing population.

In 1838, Zernukah was noted as a village in the Gaza area.

In 1863, Victor Guérin found that Zarnuqa had 300 inhabitants and that it was surrounded by tobacco plantations. A sanctuary was dedicated to a Sheik Mohammed.

An Ottoman village list from around 1870 counted 107 houses and a population of 267, though the population count included men only. Passing by, in 1871, Charles Warren described travelling in the area: "We passed through olive groves and gardens past Zernuka, until crossing over some undulating hills we came across the village Akir..."

In 1882, the PEF's Survey of Western Palestine described Zarnuqa as a large adobe village "with cactus hedges around it and wells in the gardens." In 1890, the region between Zarnuqa and Ramle, a stretch of 10,000 dunams, was described by Zionist sources as an uncultivated wasteland. In March 1892, a dispute erupted between the shepherds of Zarnuqa and the Jewish farmers of the newly established moshava of Rehovot, which was finally resolved in the courts.

In 1913, a violent clash, which according to the Jewish side was sparked by the theft of grapes from a Rishon LeZion vineyard, resulted in the deaths of two Jews from Rehovot and an Arab of Zarnuqa. However, documents recently discovered in Istanbul archives gives the Arab version: they said that the Jews "wanted to strip the camel owner[s] of their clothes, money and camels, but these men refused to give their camels and escaped from Lun Kara with their camels, protecting each other [to seek refuge with] men of the law… The above mentioned Jews attacked our villages, robbed and looted our property, killed and even damaged the family honor, all this in a manner we find hard to put in words." They further wrote: "By payments they do whatever they want, as if they have a small government of their own in the country."

=== British Mandate ===
In the 1922 census of Palestine conducted by the British Mandate authorities, Zarnuqa' had a population of 967 inhabitants, all Muslims, increasing in the 1931 census to 1,952; still all Muslims, in a total of 414 houses.

In 1926, the Jewish National Fund purchased land from residents of Zarnuqa, and by 1931 had established on that land the first workers' moshav (moshav ovdim), known as Kfar Marmorek, now a suburb of Rehovot, in which ten Yemenite-Jewish families evicted from Kinneret in 1931 were resettled. In 1929, Zarnuqa had 1,122 dunams of citrus orchards and most of its economic growth derived from citriculture. In 1934, Zionist writer Ze'ev Smilansky attributed the modernisation of the village to its proximity to Rehovot and land sales to Jews by both effendis and fellahin. Advanced farming technologies were introduced under the tuition of their Jewish neighbors.

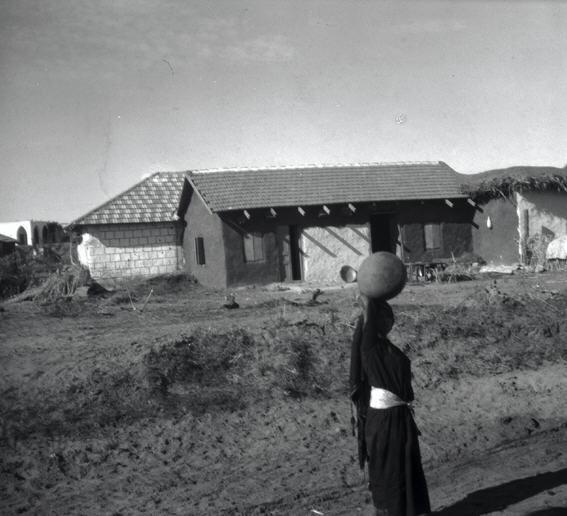
Zarnuqa, 1935

The village had two elementary schools, with one of them for boys, founded in 1924, and the other one for girls, founded in 1943, initially with 65 students. In 1945, the boy school had 252 students.

In the 1945 statistics, the village was counted with Gibton, and together they had a total population of 2,620; 2,380 Muslims and 240 Jews.

The land ownership of the village before occupation in dunams:

Owner	Dunams
Arab	5,640
Jewish	1,578
Public	327
Total	7,545

Types of land use in dunams in the village in 1945:

Land Usage	Arab	Jewish
Citrus and bananas	2,070	1,015
Irrigated and plantation	1,189	13
Cereal	2,266	493
Urban	68	0
Cultivable	5,525	1,521
Non-cultivable	47	57

=== 1948 and aftermath ===
At the beginning of December 1947, the residents of Zarnuqa considered entering into a non-belligerency pact with Rehovot but apparently it was not formalized. In April 1948, Arab irregulars moved into the village. The Dar Shurbaji clan was in favor of the village surrendering its weapons and accept protection by Haganah but others objected. Women, children and the elderly were evacuated to the nearby village of Yibna, leaving the Shurbajis and several dozen armed men from other clans. Zarnuqa was depopulated on 27–28 May by the Givati Brigade during the 1948 Arab–Israeli War. One account in Al HaMishmar described how a soldier fired with a Sten gun at three people (one old man, old woman and a child) and how the villagers were taken out from the houses and had to stay in the sun, in hunger and thirst, until they surrendered the weapons they claimed they did not have. They were then expelled towards Yibna. In total, six died and 22 were taken prisoners. The day after, the inhabitants returned and recounted that the Yibna villagers saw them as traitors. The Zarnuqa villagers saw their village being ransacked by Jewish soldiers and nearby settlers. They were expelled again and the houses were demolished the month after.

The family of the Shaqaqi brothers, Fathi (one of the founders of the Palestinian Islamic Jihad) and the political scientist Khalil Ibrahim, was from Zarnuqa. They fled in the face of rumours of massacres of Palestinians by Yishuv troops and expected to return after the hostilities ended. They were not permitted to come back. Haidar Eid, Associate Professor at al-Aqsa University in Gaza, states that his parent were evicted from the village by members of the Haganah and Stern gang who told them: "Leave your homes or we will kill and rape you".

After the establishment of Israel, the Zarnuqa ma'abara was established on the site to house Jewish refugees from Eastern Europe and Arab lands.

== Notable resident and their descendants ==
- Fathi Shaqaqi (1951-1995), founder and Secretary-General of the Palestinian Islamic Jihad
- Khalil Shakaki (b. 1953), political scientist, director of the Palestinian Center for Policy and Survey Research and pollster based in Ramallah
- Haidar Eid, Returning to Zarnouqa, May 15, 2024, Mondoweiss

== Bibliography ==
- Ajami, Moshe (2007-10-17). "Zarnuqa". Hadashot Arkheologiyot – Excavations and Surveys in Israel (119).
- Avneri, Arieh L. (1984). The Claim of Dispossession: Jewish Land-settlement and the Arabs, 1878-1948. Transaction Publishers. ISBN 0-87855-964-7.
- Barron, J.B., ed. (1923). Palestine: Report and General Abstracts of the Census of 1922. Government of Palestine.
- Belcove-Shalin, Janet S. (1995). New World Hasidim: Ethnographic Studies of Hasidic Jews in America. Suny Press. ISBN 0-79142-246-1.
- Cohen, H. (2008). Army of Shadows, Palestinian Collaboration with Zionism, 1917–1948. University of California Press. ISBN 978-0-520-25221-9.
- Conder, C.R.; Kitchener, H. H. (1882). The Survey of Western Palestine: Memoirs of the Topography, Orography, Hydrography, and Archaeology. Vol. 2. London: Committee of the Palestine Exploration Fund.
- Dagot, Angelina (2006-08-06). "Zarnuqa". Hadashot Arkheologiyot – Excavations and Surveys in Israel (118).
- Dagot, Angelina (2008-10-05). "Zarnuqa". Hadashot Arkheologiyot – Excavations and Surveys in Israel (120).
- Department of Statistics (1945). Village Statistics, April, 1945. Government of Palestine.
- Fogel, Peter (2007-12-18). "Zarnuqa". Hadashot Arkheologiyot – Excavations and Surveys in Israel (119).
- Glick, Alexander (2008-07-16). "Zarnuqa". Hadashot Arkheologiyot – Excavations and Surveys in Israel (120).
- Golan, Dor (2008-08-05). "Zarnuqa". Hadashot Arkheologiyot – Excavations and Surveys in Israel (120).
- Guérin, V. (1869). Description Géographique Historique et Archéologique de la Palestine. Vol. 1, Judee, pt. 2. Paris, L'Imprimerie Imp.
- Hadawi, S. (1970). Village Statistics of 1945: A Classification of Land and Area ownership in Palestine. Palestine Liberation Organization Research Center.
- Hartmann, M. (1883). "Die Ortschaftenliste des Liwa Jerusalem in dem türkischen Staatskalender für Syrien auf das Jahr 1288 der Flucht (1871)". Zeitschrift des Deutschen Palästina-Vereins. 6: 102–149.
- Johnson, Penny: Take My Camel: The Disappearing Camels of Jerusalem and Jaffa, jerusalemquarterly.org
- Karmon, Y. (1960). "An Analysis of Jacotin's Map of Palestine" (PDF). Israel Exploration Journal. 10 (3, 4): 155–173, 244–253. Archived from the original (PDF) on 2017-12-01.
- Khalidi, W. (1992). All That Remains: The Palestinian Villages Occupied and Depopulated by Israel in 1948. Washington D.C.: Institute for Palestine Studies. ISBN 0-88728-224-5.
- Karlinsky, Nahum (2012). California Dreaming: Ideology, Society, and Technology in the Citrus Industry of Palestine, 1890-1939. Suny Press. ISBN 978-0-79148-291-9.
- Marmelstein, Yitzhak (2014-09-08). "Zarnuqa". Hadashot Arkheologiyot – Excavations and Surveys in Israel (126).
- Mills, E., ed. (1932). Census of Palestine 1931. Population of Villages, Towns and Administrative Areas. Jerusalem: Government of Palestine.
- Morris, B. (2004). The Birth of the Palestinian Refugee Problem Revisited. Cambridge University Press. ISBN 978-0-521-00967-6.
- Palmer, E.H. (1881). The Survey of Western Palestine: Arabic and English Name Lists Collected During the Survey by Lieutenants Conder and Kitchener, R. E. Transliterated and Explained by E.H. Palmer. Committee of the Palestine Exploration Fund.
- Petersen, Andrew (2001). A Gazetteer of Buildings in Muslim Palestine (British Academy Monographs in Archaeology). Vol. 1. Oxford University Press. ISBN 978-0-19-727011-0.
- Reuter, Christoph (2004). My Life is a Weapon: A Modern History of Suicide Bombing. Princeton University Press. ISBN 0-69111-759-4.
- Robinson, E.; Smith, E. (1841). Biblical Researches in Palestine, Mount Sinai and Arabia Petraea: A Journal of Travels in the year 1838. Vol. 3. Boston: Crocker & Brewster.
- Socin, A. (1879). "Alphabetisches Verzeichniss von Ortschaften des Paschalik Jerusalem". Zeitschrift des Deutschen Palästina-Vereins. 2: 135–163.
- Warren, C. (1871). "The plains of Philistia". Quarterly Statement - Palestine Exploration Fund. 3: 29–37.
