= Eifo HaYeled =

Israeli rock band

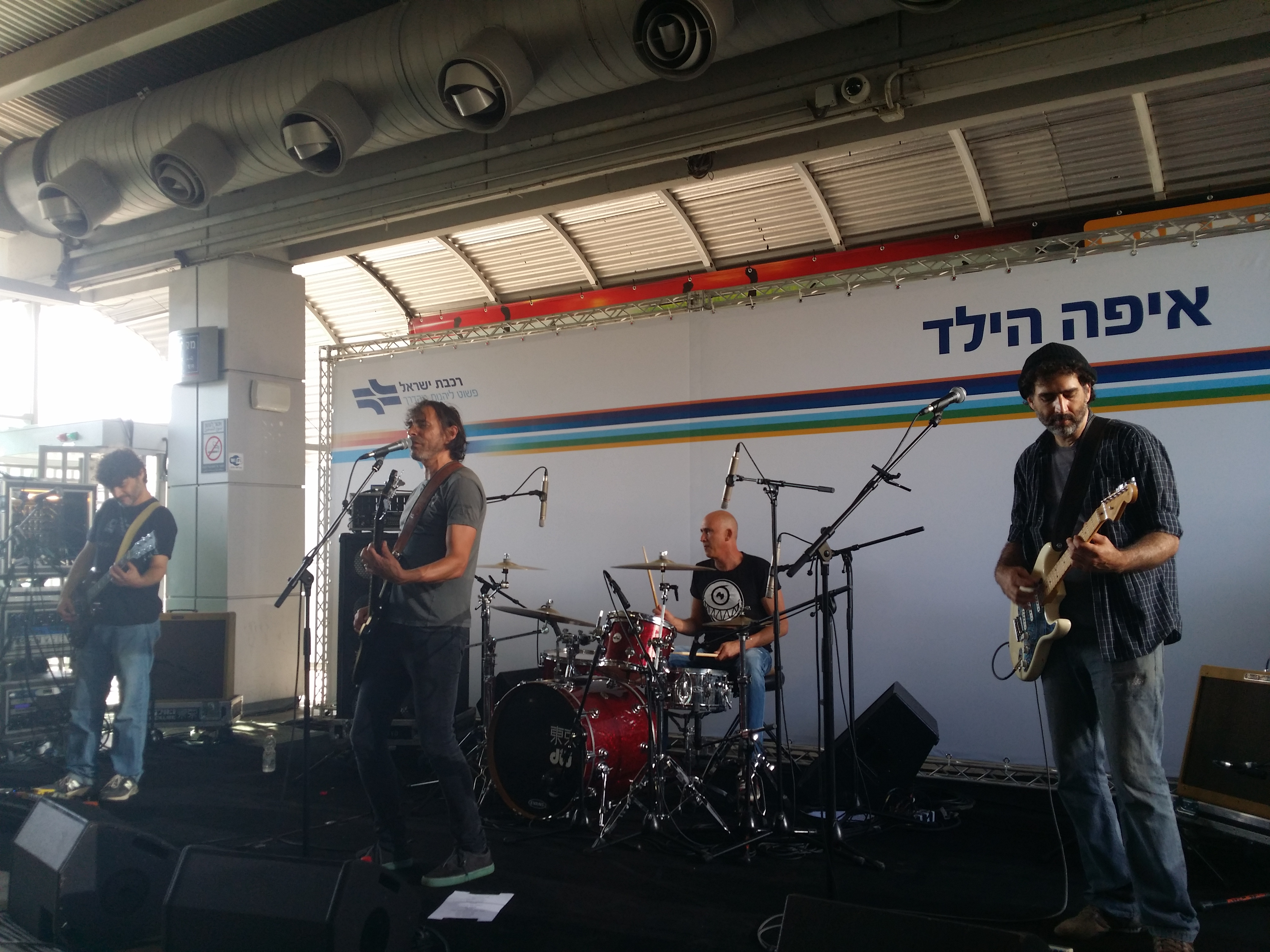
Eifo HaYeled performing at Tel Aviv Savidor Central railway station, 2015

Eifo HaYeled (Hebrew: איפה הילד, (lit: Where's the Kid) is an Israeli alternative rock band.

== History ==
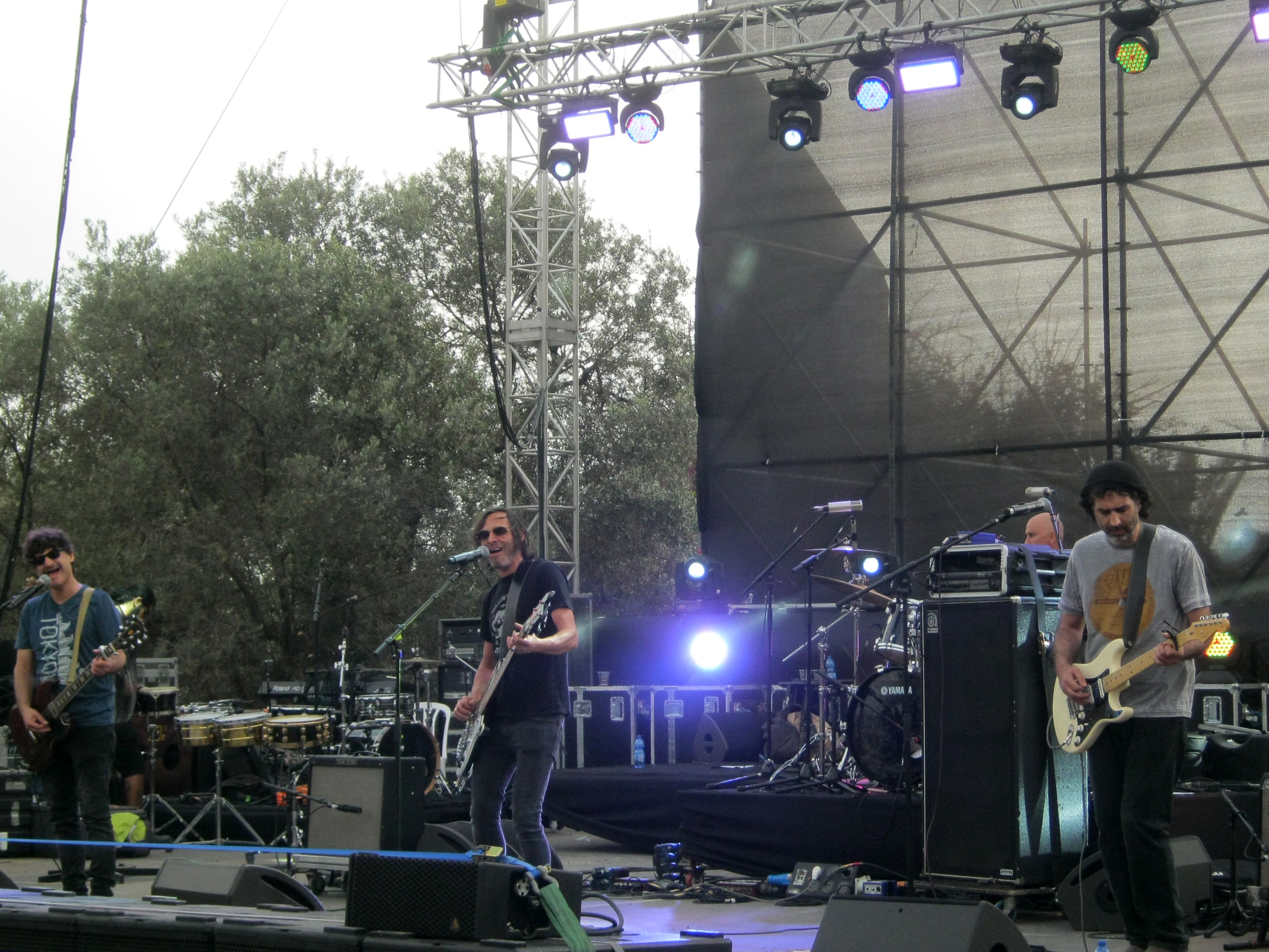
Eifo HaYeled at Students Festival, Tel Aviv University, 2016

The band was formed in 1986 in Givat Brenner and had a major influence on Israeli rock in the 1990s. It released its debut album, "Sugar Time", in 1993. According to Hemi Rudner, the band's first drummer, Omer Degani, was always late for rehearsals. At a certain point, they would start saying in English "Where's the kid?" It became a kind of standing joke which led to the name of the band Eifo Hayeled (Where's the Kid, in Hebrew).

Eifo HaYeled broke up in 1998 and reunited in 2009.

Appearing at a rally in Tel Aviv in support of residents of southern Israel in 2014, lead singer Hemi Rudner changed the words of one of the band's hit songs, "Does Anyone Hear Me?" to "Does anyone hear you?"

In June 2023, Eifo HaYeled opened the performance of the hard rock band Guns N' Roses for a crowd of over 60,000 at Tel Aviv's Yarkon Park.

== Band members ==
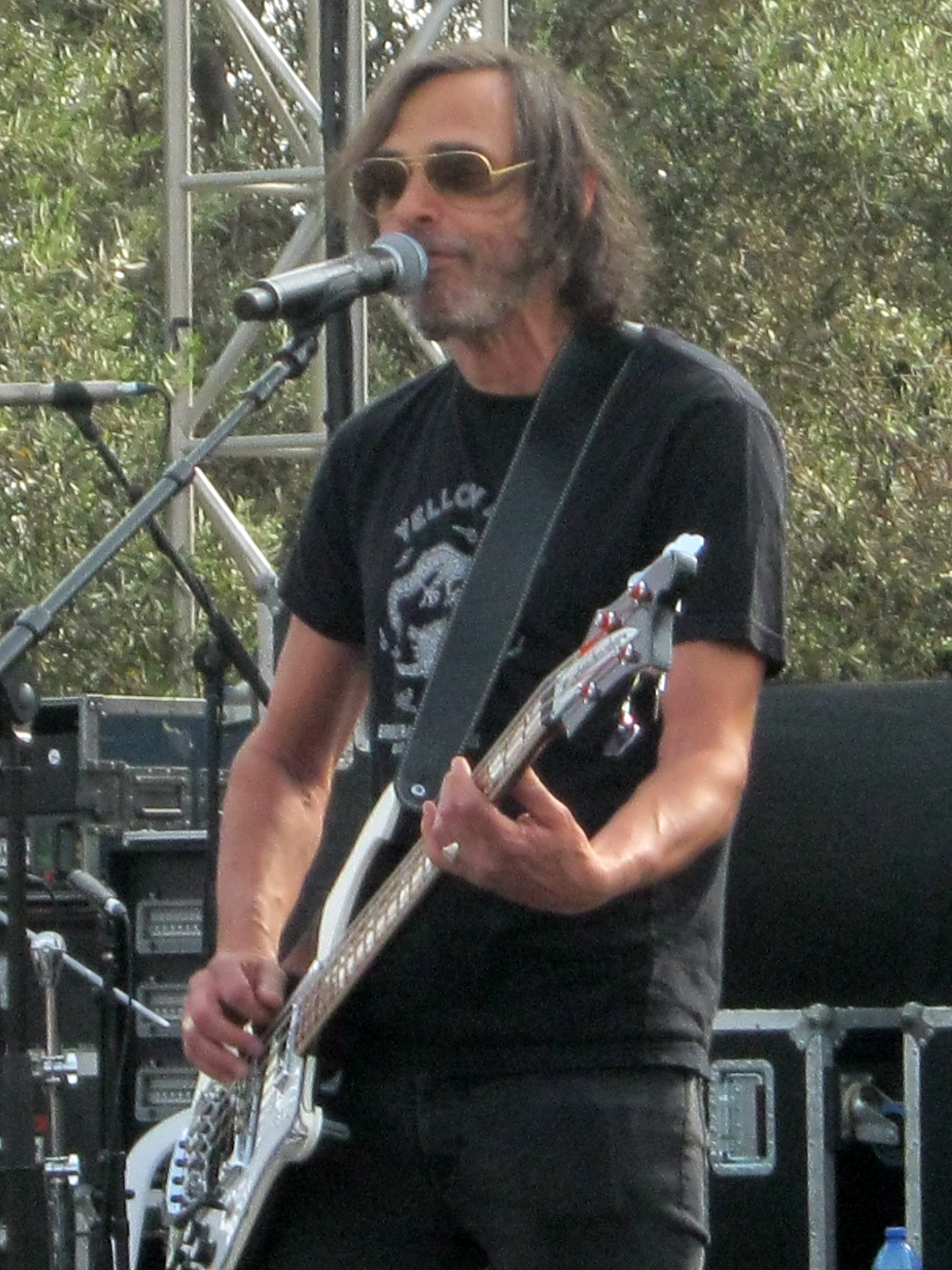
Hemi Rudner, lead singer

- Hemi Rudner - lead vocals, bass guitar
- Asaf Sarig - vocals, guitar
- Asaf Meroz - drums
- Ofir Bar-Ami - vocals, guitar
- Arad Shiff - guitar

== Discography ==
=== Albums ===
- Zman Sukar, זמן סוכר (Sugar Time), 1993.
- Shedim, שדים (Demons), 1994.
- Mas'otay Im Atzmi, מסעותיי עם עצמי (My Journeys with Myself), 1995.
- Eifo HaYeled?, איפה הילד? (Where is the Child?), 1996. Dedicated to Yitzhak Rabin
- Bnei Hamea Haesrim, בני המאה ה-20 (Members of the 20th Century), 2012.
- Matok Bahasheha, מתוק בחשיכה (Sweet in the Dark), 2017.

=== Compilations ===
- Mishehu Shomea Oti, מישהו שומע אותי (Somebody Hears Me) 1998.

== See also ==
- Music of Israel
