= Brenner Regional Council =

Regional council in Central District, Israel

Coordinates: 31°51′50″N 34°48′6″E

Brenner בְּרֵנֶר
- Regional council (from 1950)
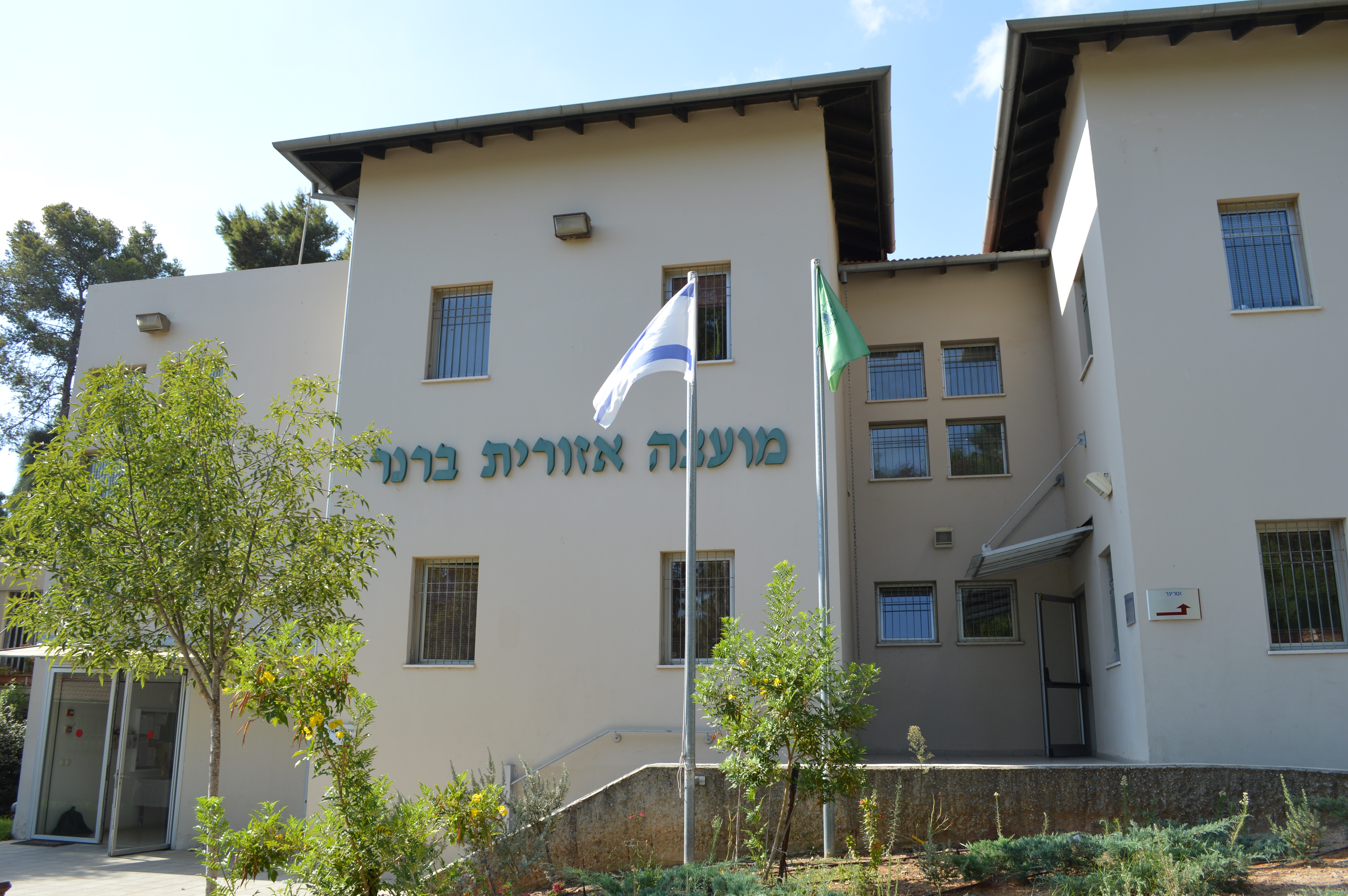
- Interactive map of Brenner
- Country: Israel
- District: Central
- Subdistrict: Rehovot
- Natural region: Rehovot

Government
  - Head of Municipality: Doron Shidelov

Area
  - Total: 36,910 dunams (36.91 km^{2}; 14.25 sq mi)

Population (2024)
  - Total: 7,843
  - Density: 212.5/km^{2} (550.3/sq mi)
- Website: Official website

Brenner Regional Council (Hebrew: מוֹעָצָה אֲזוֹרִית בְּרֵנֶר, Mo'atza Azorit Brenner; Arabic: المجلس الإقليمي برنر), is a regional council in the Central District of Israel. It is located in the westernmost portion of the Shephelah, in the vicinity of Rehovot and Yavne. The council is named after writer Yosef Haim Brenner, killed in the Jaffa riots of 1921.

The Council was established in 1950, with a jurisdiction of 36,000 dunams. As of 2024, the six communities in the council (two kibbutzim and four moshavim) are home to approximately 7,800 inhabitants.

== Localities ==
Kibbutzim
- Givat Brenner
- Kvutzat Shiller
Moshavim
- Beit Elazari
- Bnaya
- Gibton
- Kidron

== Demographics ==
Historical population
Year	Pop.	±%
1972	3,300	—
1983	3,700	+12.1%
1995	3,900	+5.4%
2008	5,700	+46.2%
2022	7,759	+36.1%
2024	7,843	+1.1%

== Voting Patterns ==
In the 2022 election, 83 percent of voters in the regional council voted for the parties of the center-left coalition led by Yair Lapid, while 17 percent voted for the parties of the right-wing coalition led by Benjamin Netanyahu and 0.2 percent voted for the Arab parties.

In the 2026 election, 82 percent of voters in the regional council voted for the parties of the center-left coalition led by Gadi Eisenkot, while 13 percent voted for the parties of the right-wing coalition led by Benjamin Netanyahu and 0.3 percent voted for the Arab parties. An additional 3 percent voted for the Reservists, and 1.5 percent voted for Amcha Yisrael. Voter turnout increased 10 percent from the 2022 election.
