= Givat Brenner =

Kibbutz in central Israel

Givat Brenner: גבעת ברנר (Hebrew)
- Kibbutz
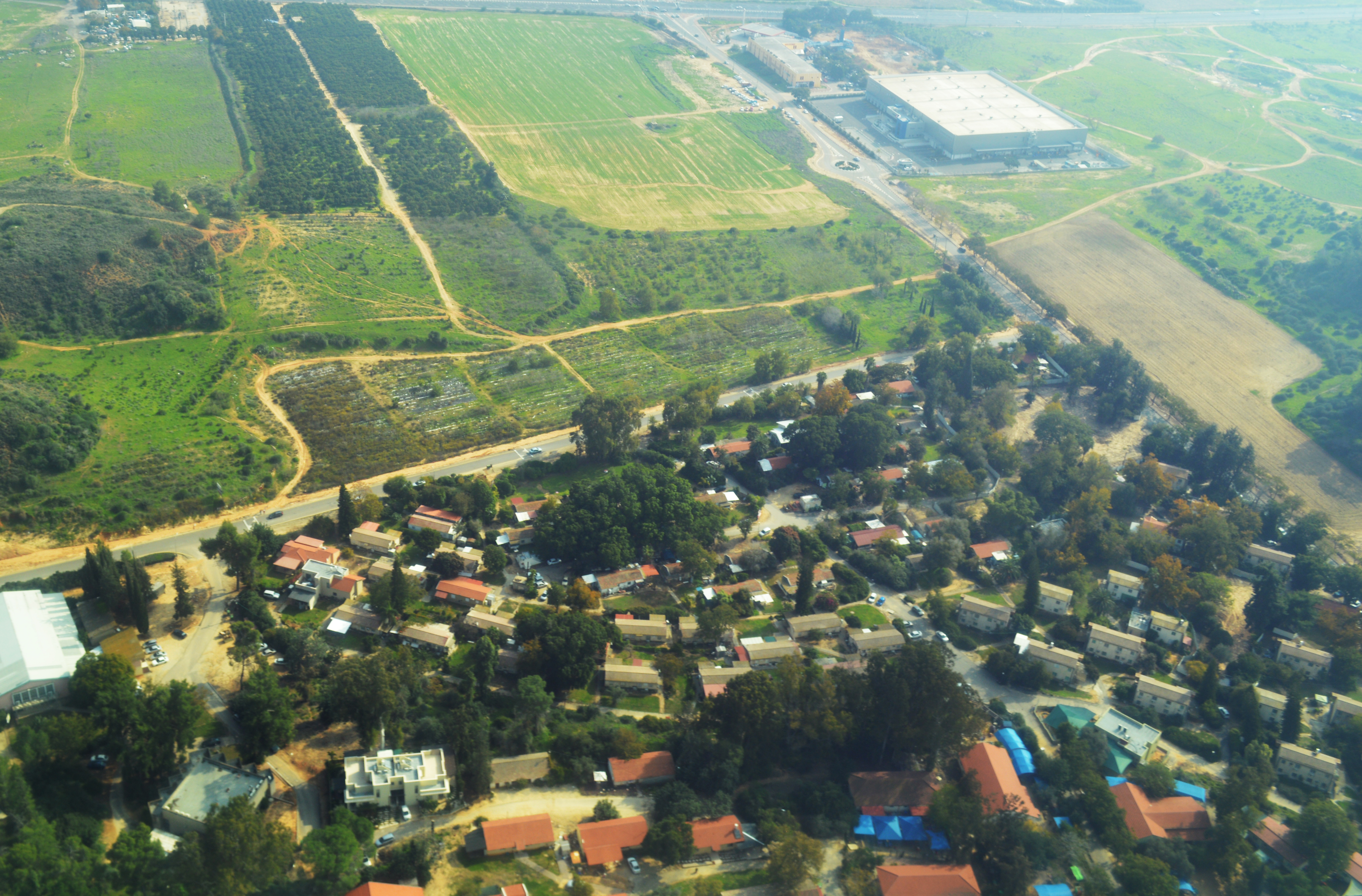
- Etymology: Brenner Hill
- Location within Central Israel Location within Israel
- Coordinates: 31°52′3″N 34°48′12″E
- Country: Israel
- District: Central
- Subdistrict: Rehovot
- Council: Brenner
- Affiliation: Kibbutz Movement
- Founded: 1928; 98 years ago
- Founder: Italian Jews, Lithuanian, Polish and German Jews
- Population (2024): 2,518
- Website: www.gbrener.org.il

Givat Brenner (Hebrew: גבעת ברנר, lit. 'Brenner Hill'), is a kibbutz in the Central District of Israel. Located around two kilometres (one mile) south of Rehovot, it falls under the jurisdiction of Brenner Regional Council. Founded in 1928, it is named after writer Yosef Haim Brenner, who was killed in the Jaffa riots of 1921. In 2024 it had a population of 2,518. It is the largest kibbutz in Israel.

== History ==
Givat Brenner was founded in 1928 by Enzo Sereni and a group of immigrants from Lithuania, Poland and Germany. That same year, pioneers had settled on some 200 dunams (49.4 acres) of land that had been purchased by Moshe Smilansky from the Arab landholders of Aqir and Zarnuqa. During World War II, Givat Brenner supplied products such as jam to the British Army, which laid the foundation for its export business.

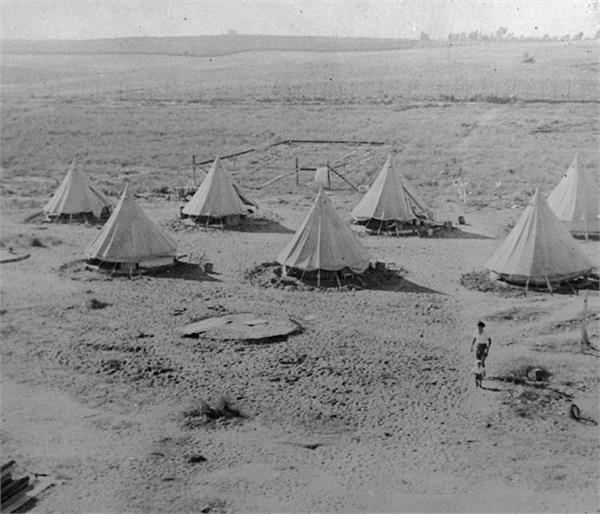
Givat Brenner 1928

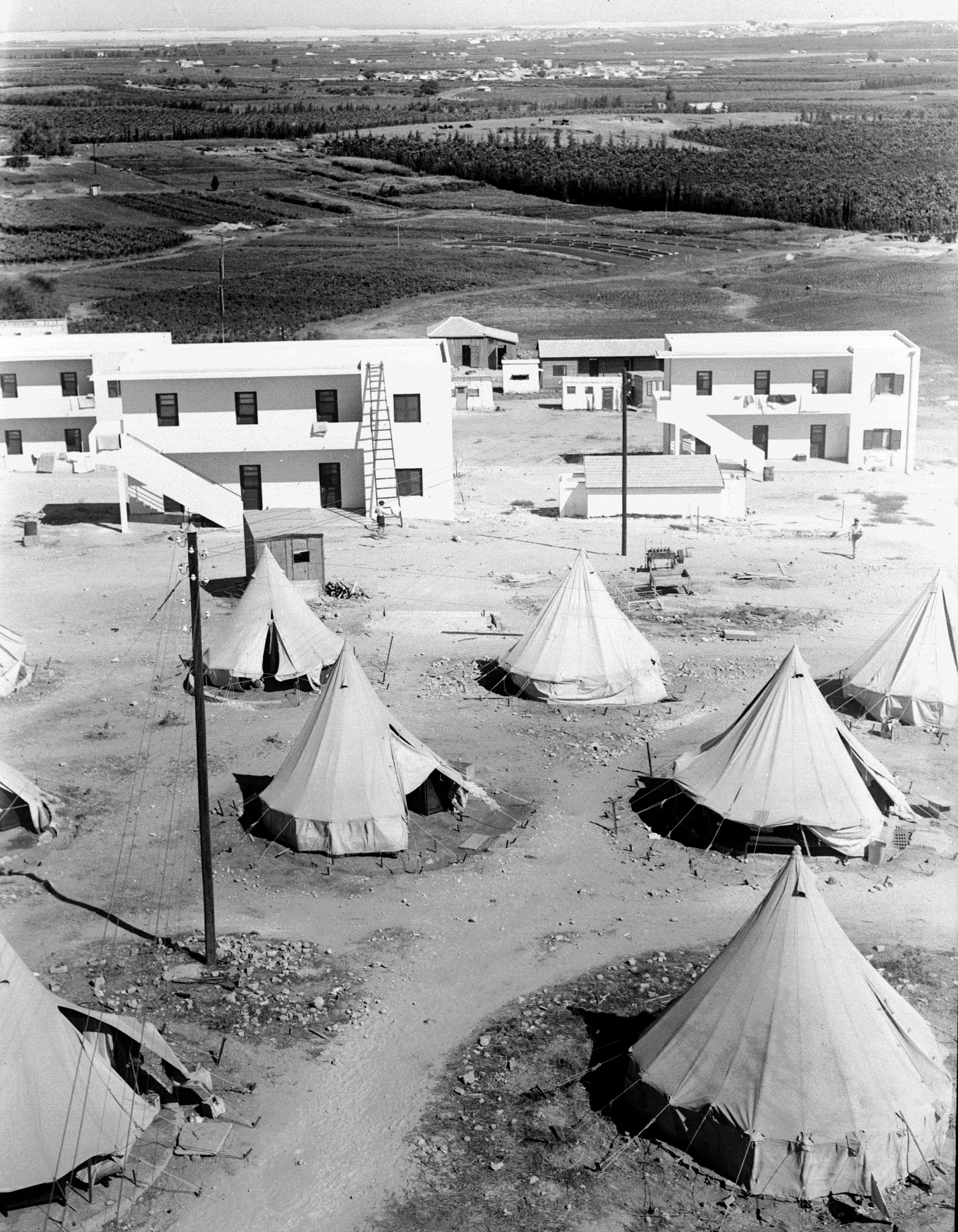
Kibbutz Givat Brenner, 1935

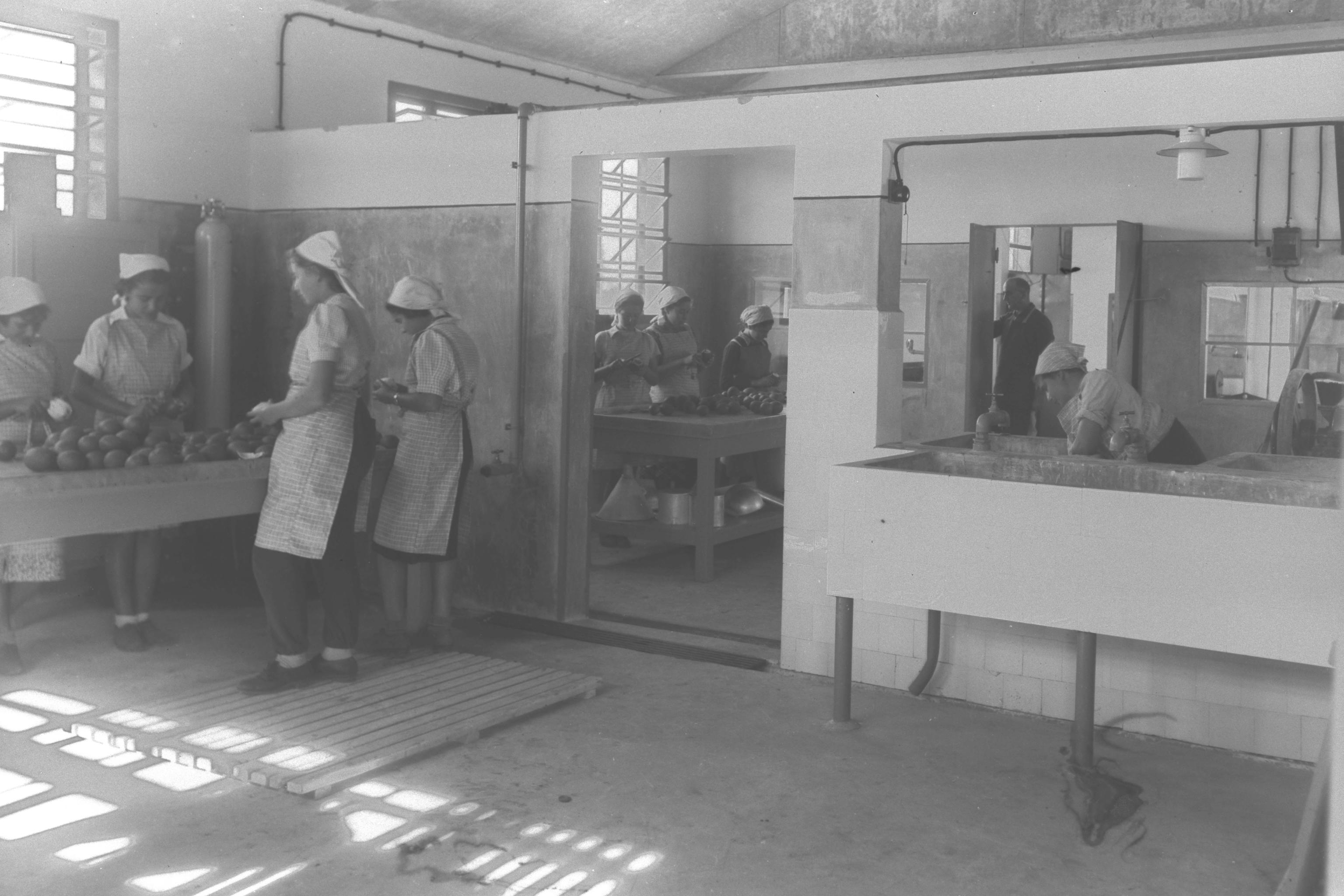
Food canning factory, Givat Brenner, 1939

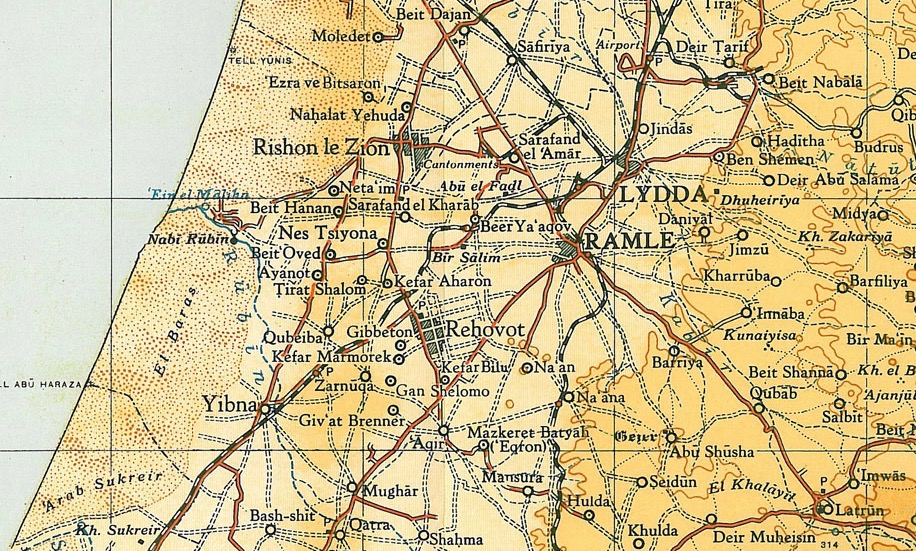
Givat Brenner 1945 1:250,000

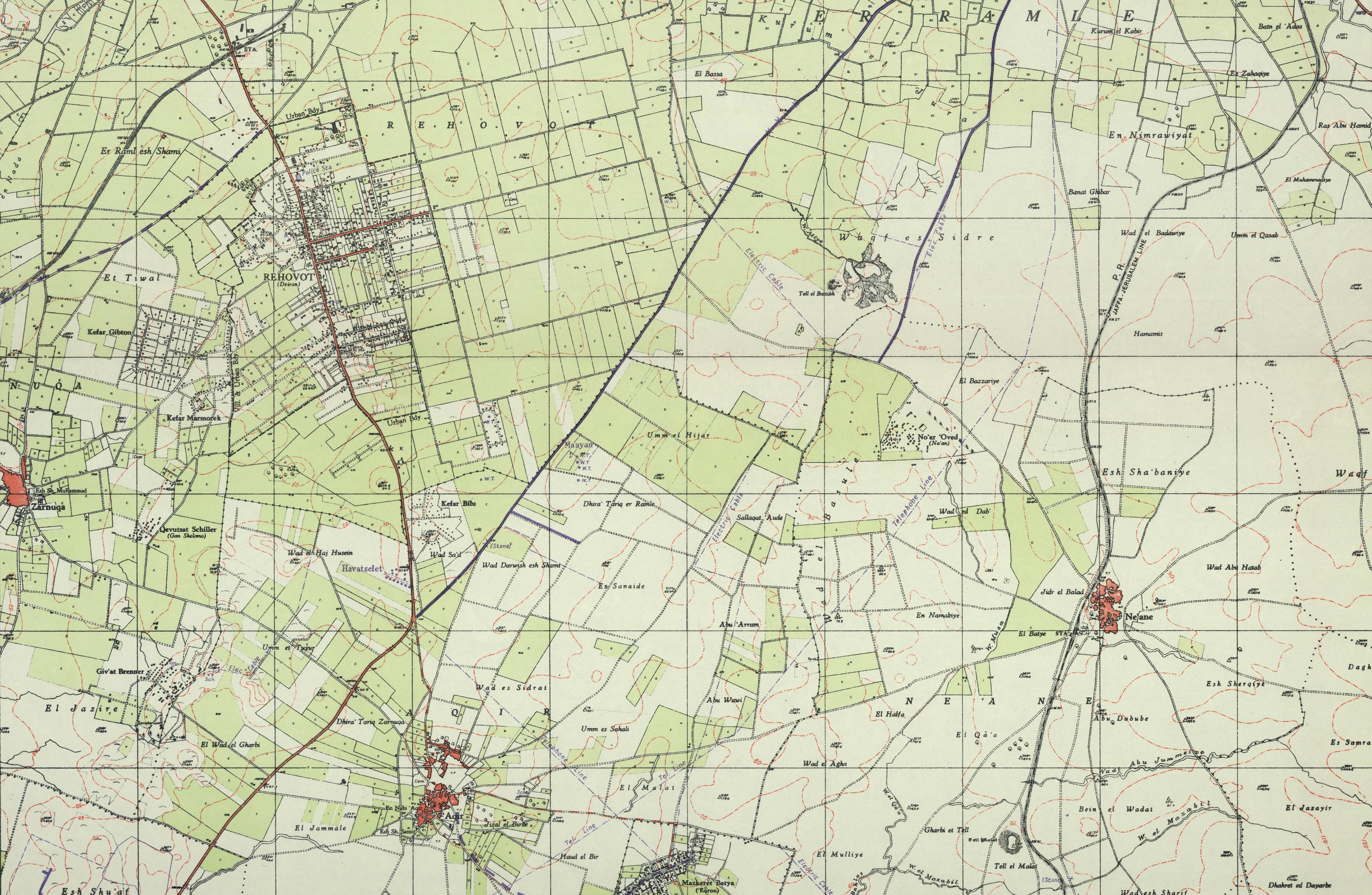
Givat Brenner 1:20,000

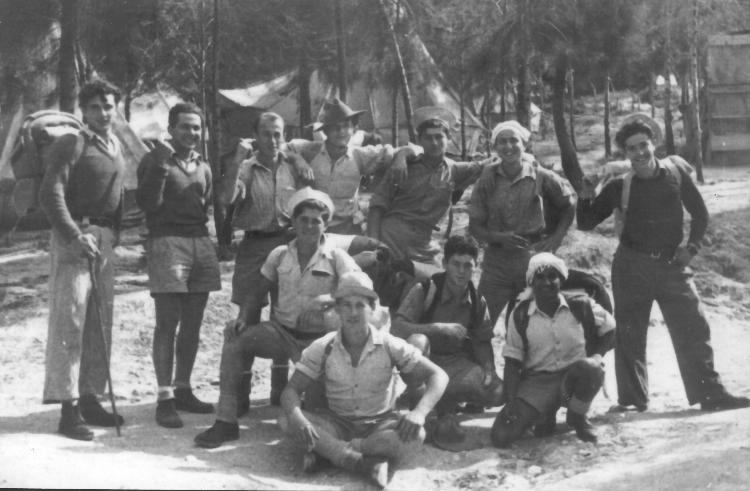
Members of Company H, Palmach, in Giv'at Brenner, 1945

The establishment of an irrigation equipment factory led to the creation of a foundry. The foundry evolved into a specialized aluminum die-casting company, which has produced, among other things, the housings for emergency phones along the New Jersey Turnpike. In 1938, it opened the first kibbutz sanatorium in the country.

== Demographics ==
According to a census conducted in 1931 by the British Mandate authorities, Givat Brenner had a population of 155 inhabitants and a total of 5 residential houses. In 1970 the population was 480.

== Education ==
Givat Brenner Regional School serves the communities of the Brenner Regional Council. The offices of the Regional Council are also located in the Kibbutz.

== Economy ==
Givat Brenner's plant nursery supplies turf for lawns and parks. The kibbutz grows cotton, avocado, wheat and corn. Industrial ventures include a furniture factory, metalwork factory, canned foods plant and an irrigation equipment factory, which gradually shut down for financial reasons. The 'House of Dreams' amusement park was established to offset waning income from the orchards, plant nurseries and factories, but was eventually closed.

== Landmarks ==
The Treasure Museum, in the heart of the kibbutz, opened on the Givat Brenner's seventieth anniversary. It houses a collection of artifacts and photographs that tell the story of the kibbutz pioneers.

== Notable people ==
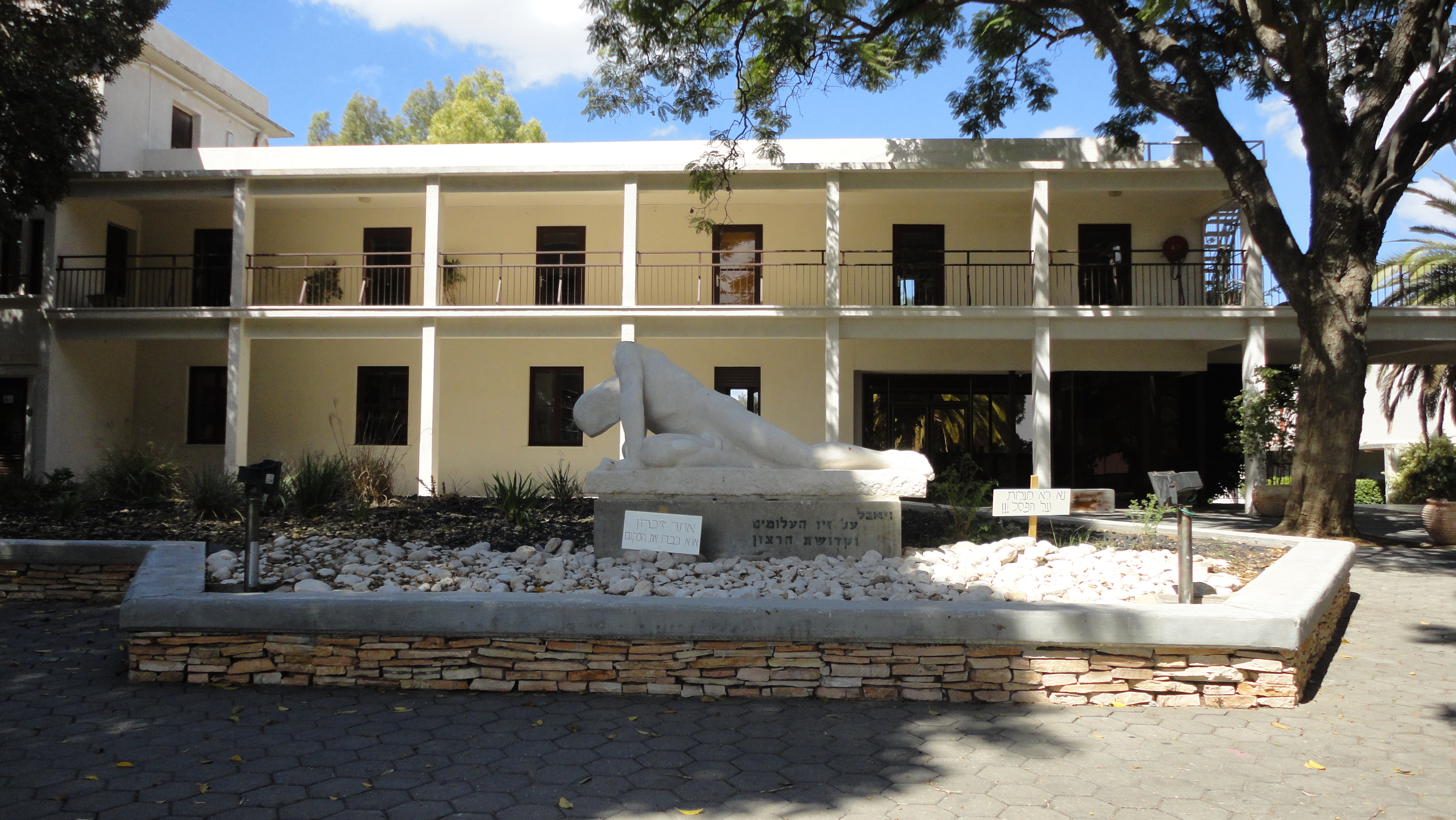
Sculpture by Jacob Loutchansky

- Achi Brandt, mathematician noted for pioneering contributions to multigrid methods
- Aharon Megged, author
- Dorothy Bar-Adon, an American-born journalist, lived in the kibbutz from 1936-1938
- Yitzhak Sadeh, writer and Haganah officer
- Jessie Sampter, poet, close friend of Hadassah founder Henrietta Szold, established a vegetarian convalescent home on the kibbutz in 1938
- Isaac Frenkel Frenel, Ecole de Paris artist, lived in the kibbutz with his family (1941-1942), taught art in a nearby school.
- Hemi Rudner rock musician, songwriter, member of Eifo HaYeled
