= Kidron, Israel =

Moshav in central Israel

Kidron: קִדְרוֹן (Hebrew)
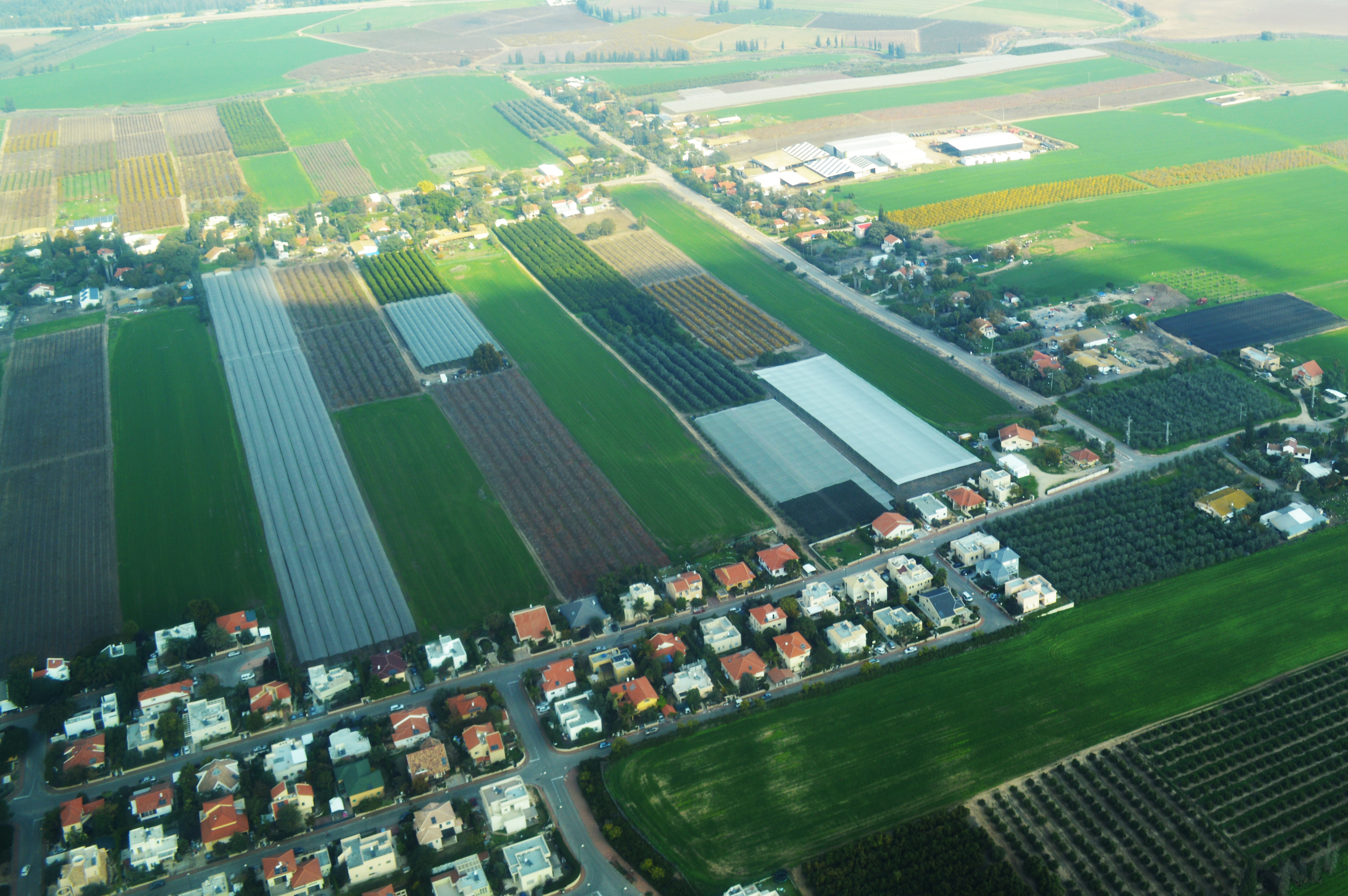

- Location within Central Israel
- Coordinates: 31°48′48″N 34°47′50″E
- Country: Israel
- District: Central
- Subdistrict: Rehovot
- Council: Brenner
- Affiliation: Moshavim Movement
- Founded: 1949
- Founder: Yugoslavian immigrants
- Population (2024): 1,732
- Website: www.kidron.org.il

Kidron (Hebrew: קִדְרוֹן) is a moshav in central Israel. Located in the Shephelah just east of Gedera, and near the Tel Nof Airbase, it falls under the jurisdiction of Brenner Regional Council. In 2024 it had a population of 1,732.

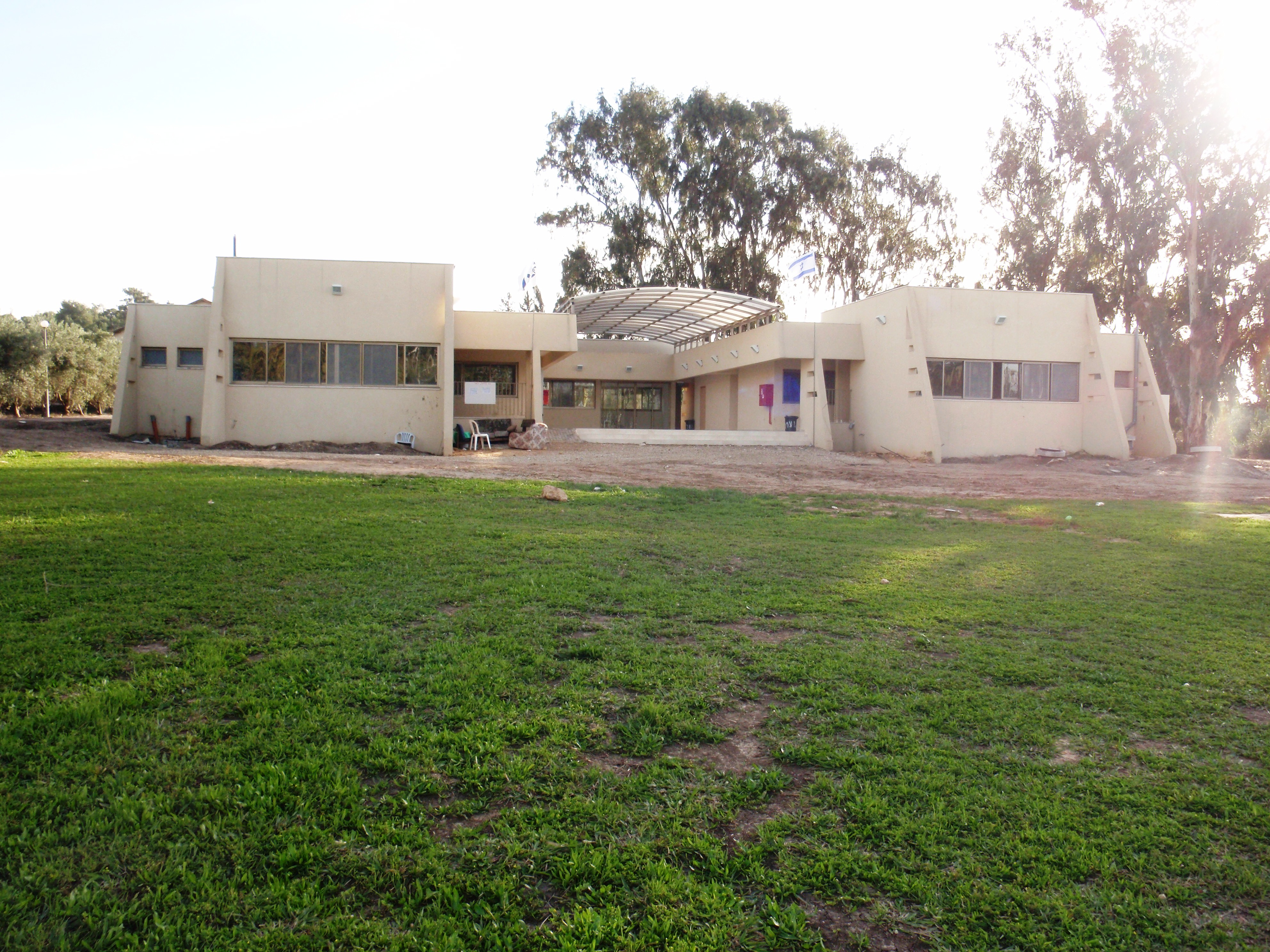
Kidron community center

== History ==
The moshav was established in 1949 by a group of Jewish immigrants from Yugoslavia. It was named for the Kidron Valley. They were later joined by Jewish immigrants from Romania.

It was established on land near the depopulated Palestinian village of Qatra, which became depopulated in the 1948 Arab–Israeli War.
