= Qatra =

Qatra قطرة
- Etymology: drop
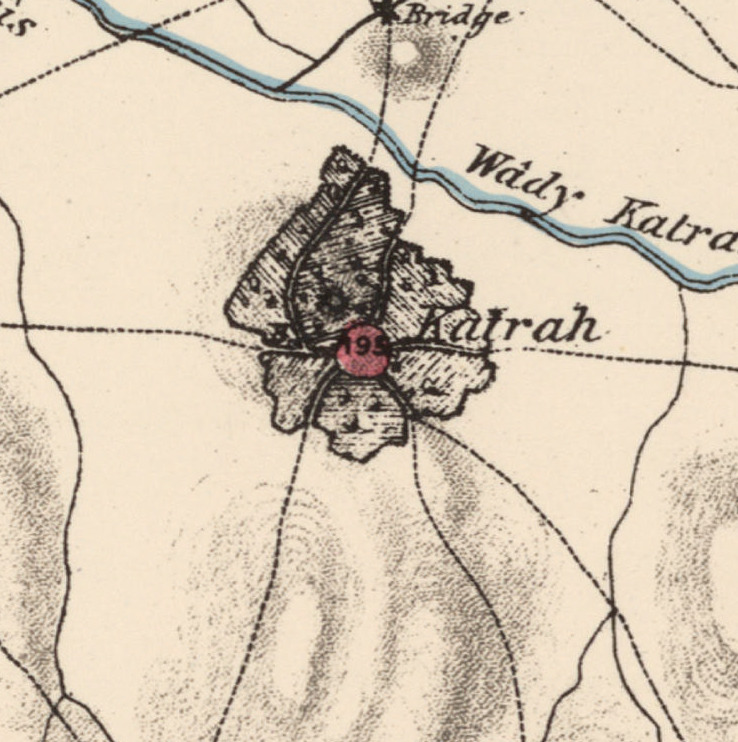
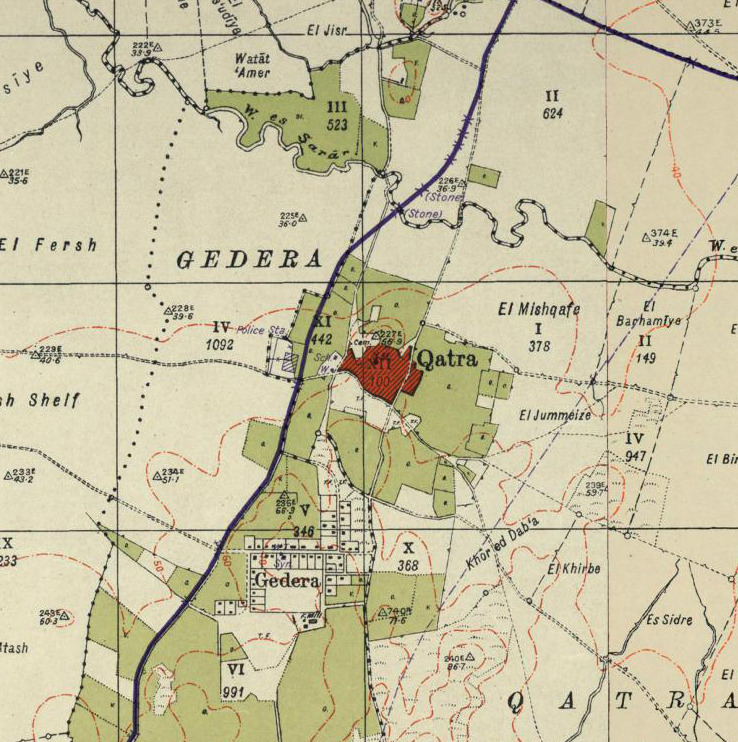
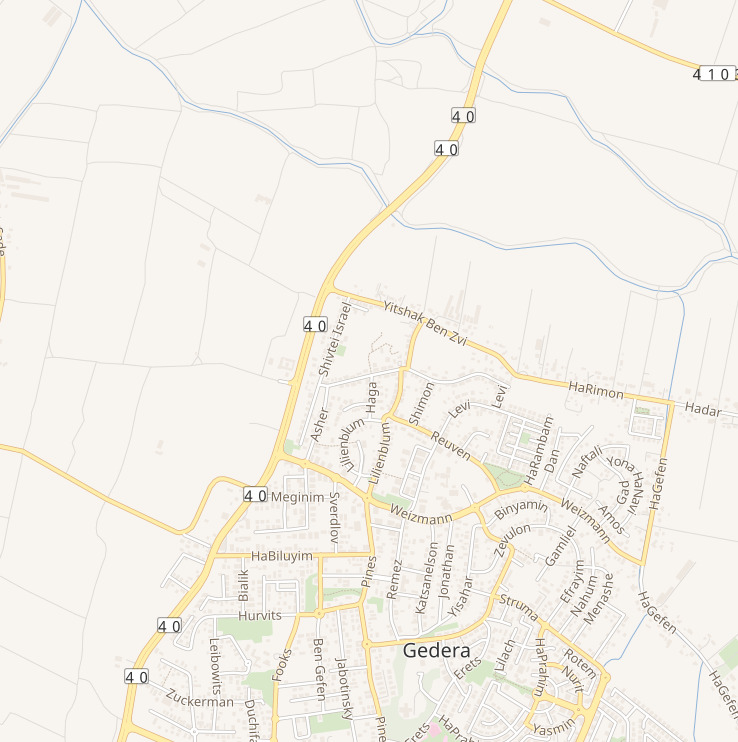
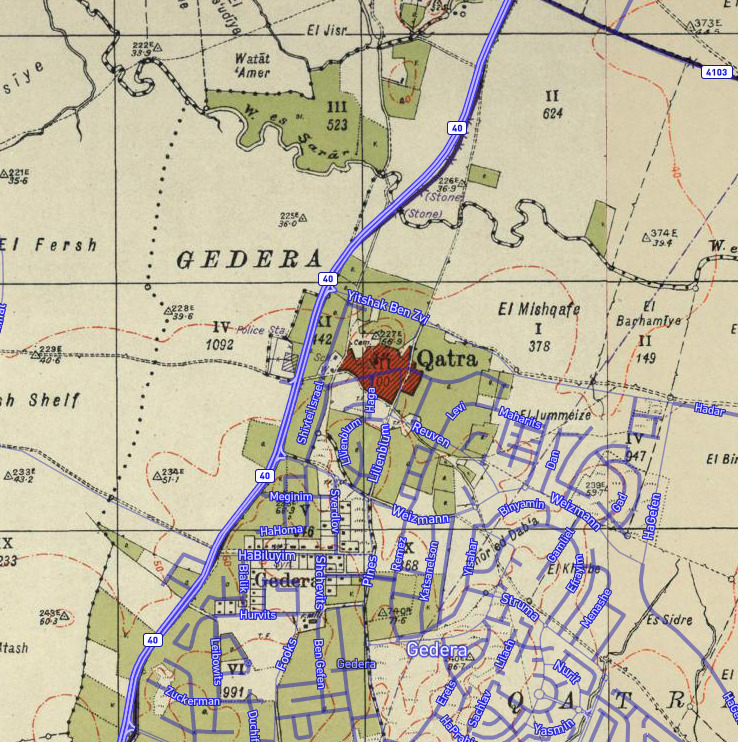
- 1870s map 1940s map modern map 1940s with modern overlay map A series of historical maps of the area around Qatra (click the buttons)

- Location within Mandatory Palestine
- Coordinates: 31°49′18.9″N 34°46′39.1″E
- Palestine grid: 129/136
- Geopolitical entity: Mandatory Palestine
- Subdistrict: Ramle
- Date of depopulation: May 1948

Area
  - Total: 7,853 dunams (7.853 km^{2}; 3.032 sq mi)

Population (1945)
  - Total: 1,210
- Cause(s) of depopulation: Military assault by Yishuv forces
- Secondary cause: Expulsion by Yishuv forces
- Current Localities: Gedera and Kidron

Qatra (Arabic: قطرة) was a Palestinian Arab village in the Ramle Subdistrict, located 15 kilometers (9.3 mi) southwest of the city of Ramla and 40 kilometers (25 mi) west of Jerusalem, some 50 meters (160 ft) above sea level. It was depopulated in May 1948.

== History ==
Qatra was a Canaanite center of political and economic authority that along with 30 other urban sites in regions bordering the Mediterranean Sea, entered a period of decline in the Late Bronze Age between 1250 and 1150 BCE. Qatra is also tentatively identified with the Hellenistic city of Kidron (Cidron, Gedrus) mentioned in the first Book of the Maccabees (15:39, 41; 16:9), and it has been postulated that its name derives from the Hebrew name for Kidron, Qiṭrôn. Others have suggested that Qatra (Katra) is merely a corruption of the biblical Gederoth mentioned in Joshua 15:41, hence the use of the name in the Gederot Regional Council.

Qatra has been named as the place of origin of a holy man named Sheikh Ahmad al-Qatrawani, who set out from the village due to his inability to fulfill his religious duties there, and settled by 'Atara, where his Mamluk shrine still stands.

=== Ottoman era ===
In 1596, Qatra was part of the Ottoman Empire, nahiya (subdistrict) of Gaza under the liwa' (district) of Gaza with a population of 46 families and 15 bachelors, an estimated 336 person, all Muslim. They paid a fixed tax-rate of 25% on agricultural products, including wheat, barley, sesame, and fruit, as well as goats and beehives; a total of 11,340 akçe. 1/6 of the revenue went to a waqf.

In 1838, Kutrah was noted as a Muslim village in the Gaza district.

In 1863, Victor Guérin noted the village to have 600 inhabitants, and with houses of Rammed earth. He further noted a noria by the well, which he assumed to be ancient. By the well were also six sections of barrels of columns of gray marble, the diameter of which was thirty centimetres. The villagers told Guérin they had "always" been there. Hedges of cacti surrounded the village and served as fences for figs and olive trees. There were also several "magnificent" acacia or mimosas there.

An Ottoman village list of about 1870 showed that Katra had a population of 353, in 161 houses, though the population count included men only. It was also noted that it was located south east of Yibna.

In 1882, the PEF's Survey of Western Palestine (SWP) described the village as being built of adobe brick and surrounded by gardens.

=== British Mandate era ===
In the 1922 census of Palestine conducted by the British Mandate authorities, Qatra Islam had a population of 640; 639 Muslims and 1 Orthodox Christian increasing in the 1931 census to 822, all Muslims, in a total of 175 houses.

During its existence as a village in the British Mandate of Palestine it was referred to as Qatrat Islam to distinguish it from the Jewish settlement of Qatrat Yahud or Gedera, as it is called in Hebrew, established in the late 19th century.

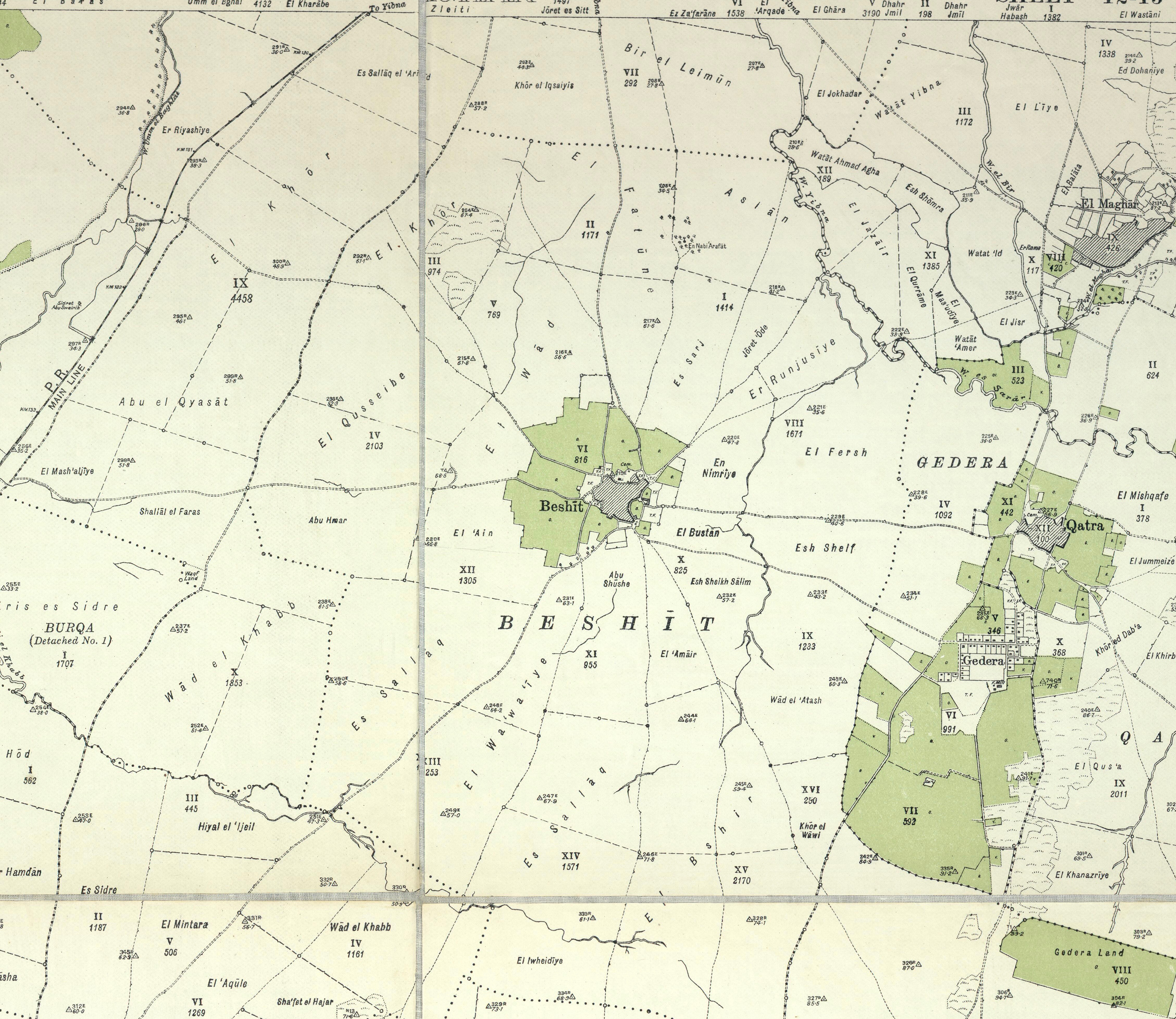
Qatra 1930 1:20,000

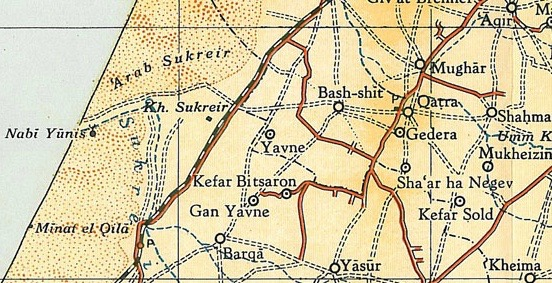
Qatra 1945 1:250,000

In the 1945 statistics the population was 1,290, all Muslims, while the total land area was 7,853 dunams, according to an official land and population survey. Of this, Arabs used 291 dunams for citrus and bananas, 215 dunums were irrigated or used for orchards, 4,320 dunums were allocated to cereals, while 26 dunams were classified as built-up urban areas.

=== 1948, and aftermath ===
Qatra was captured by Israel's Givati Brigade in May 1948. The operation was according to Plan Dalet. Plan Dalets guidelines to the Givati Brigade gave its leader, Lt. Col. Shimon Avidan, wide discretion. In order to "stabilise" his lines, the plan stated that 'you will determine alone, in consultations with your Arab affairs advisers and Intelligence Service officers, [which] villages in your zone should be occupied, cleansed or destroyed.' During May to early June, Avidan moved to expand his area of control westwards and southwards as part of Operation Barak.

It was during these operations that they encountered the village of Qatra. The village offered no resistance. The Givati troops entered and conducted an arms collection operation on 5–6 May. About 60 weapons were handed over - but a Jewish officer was shot and killed (either by an Arab or by friendly fire) while searching one of the houses. Three Arabs were then taken hostage and Givati demanded the name of the killer, and the handover of any foreign irregulars and additional weapons. The Haganah reoccupied the village and its entire population were either intimidated into flight or expelled on 17 May. The IDF trucked about 200 refugees staying in Majdal, originally from Qatra, towards Ramla in the summer of 1950.

The operation in Qatra (and a similar operation in the nearby village of Aqir) was characterised by looting and brutal behaviour. The HIS officer who accompanied the troops later highlighted several problems, including the lack of clear orders regarding behaviour, the absence of POW camp for detainees, and looting. The Givati Brigade's official history states that after these operations, the brigade HQ acted to 'curtail the instinct to loot and maltreat prisoners [hit'alelut beshvuyim]'.

In 1949, the Israeli moshav of Kidron was established on Qatra's land. The current Israeli towns built on Qatra's land are Gedera and Kidron.

== See also ==
- Barid, Muslim postal network strengthened in Palestine during the Mamluk period (roads, bridges, khans); Qatra was a barid station
- Depopulated Palestinian locations in Israel

== Bibliography ==
- Avneri, Arieh L. (1984). The Claim of Dispossession: Jewish Land-settlement and the Arabs, 1878-1948. Transaction Publishers. ISBN 0-87855-964-7. (p. 90 notes 37, 38)
- Barron, J.B., ed. (1923). Palestine: Report and General Abstracts of the Census of 1922. Government of Palestine.
- Bromiley, G.W. (1994). The International Standard Bible Encyclopedia: K-P. Wm. B. Eerdmans Publishing. ISBN 978-0-8028-3783-7.
- Canaan, T. (1927). Mohammedan Saints and Sanctuaries in Palestine. London: Luzac & Co. (pp. 269, 288, n. 5)
- Conder, C.R. (1879). Tent Work in Palestine. A Record of Discovery and Adventure. Vol. 2. London: Richard Bentley & Son (published for the Committee of the PEF). OCLC 23589738.
- Conder, C.R.; Kitchener, H.H. (1882). The Survey of Western Palestine: Memoirs of the Topography, Orography, Hydrography, and Archaeology. Vol. 2. London: Committee of the Palestine Exploration Fund.
- Department of Statistics (1945). Village Statistics, April, 1945. Government of Palestine.
- Guérin, V. (1869). Description Géographique Historique et Archéologique de la Palestine (in French). Vol. 1: Judee, pt. 2. Paris: L'Imprimerie Nationale.
- Hadawi, S. (1970). Village Statistics of 1945: A Classification of Land and Area ownership in Palestine. Palestine Liberation Organization Research Center.
- Hartmann, M. (1883). "Die Ortschaftenliste des Liwa Jerusalem in dem türkischen Staatskalender für Syrien auf das Jahr 1288 der Flucht (1871)". Zeitschrift des Deutschen Palästina-Vereins. 6: 102–149.
- Hütteroth, W.-D.; Abdulfattah, K. (1977). Historical Geography of Palestine, Transjordan and Southern Syria in the Late 16th Century. Erlanger Geographische Arbeiten, Sonderband 5. Erlangen, Germany: Vorstand der Fränkischen Geographischen Gesellschaft. ISBN 3-920405-41-2.
- Khalidi, W. (1992). All That Remains: The Palestinian Villages Occupied and Depopulated by Israel in 1948. Washington D.C.: Institute for Palestine Studies. ISBN 0-88728-224-5.
- Mills, E., ed. (1932). Census of Palestine 1931. Population of Villages, Towns and Administrative Areas. Jerusalem: Government of Palestine.
- Morris, B. (2004). The Birth of the Palestinian Refugee Problem Revisited. Cambridge University Press. ISBN 0-521-00967-7.
- Palmer, E.H. (1881). The Survey of Western Palestine: Arabic and English Name Lists Collected During the Survey by Lieutenants Conder and Kitchener, R. E. Transliterated and Explained by E.H. Palmer. Committee of the Palestine Exploration Fund.
- Robinson, E.; Smith, E. (1841). Biblical Researches in Palestine, Mount Sinai and Arabia Petraea: A Journal of Travels in the year 1838. Vol. 3. Boston: Crocker & Brewster.
- Socin, A. (1879). "Alphabetisches Verzeichniss von Ortschaften des Paschalik Jerusalem". Zeitschrift des Deutschen Palästina-Vereins. 2: 135–163.
- Zevit, Z. (2003). The Religions of Ancient Israel: A Synthesis of Parallactic Approaches. Continuum International Publishing Group. ISBN 978-0-8264-6339-5.
