= Bnaya =

Moshav in central Israel

Bnaya: בְּנַיָה (Hebrew)
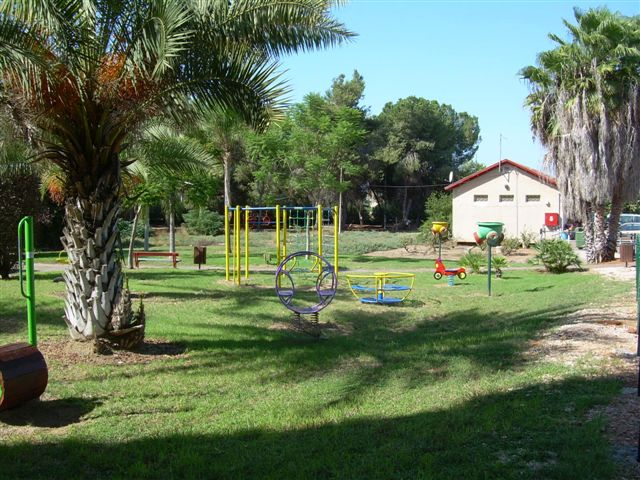

- Location within Central Israel Location within Israel
- Coordinates: 31°50′36″N 34°45′8″E
- Country: Israel
- District: Central
- Subdistrict: Rehovot
- Council: Brenner
- Affiliation: Moshavim Movement
- Founded: 1949
- Founder: Czechoslovak, Hungarian, Polish and Romanian Jews
- Population (2024): 893

Bnaya (Hebrew: בְּנַיָה) is a moshav in central Israel. Located in the westernmost portion of the Shephelah near Ashdod, Gedera and Yavne, it falls under the jurisdiction of Brenner Regional Council. In 2024 it had a population of 893.

== History ==
The village was founded in 1949 by Jewish immigrants from Czechoslovakia, Hungary, Poland and Romania, and was initially named Yavne HaDromit (יבנה הדרומית, lit. Southern Yavne) due to its location south of the town. However, later after a process of metathesis of the word "Yavne" the name was changed to Bnaya, named after "an officer under David" mentioned in 1 Chronicles 11:22, a member of the tribe of Simeon (1 Chronicles 4:36) dwelling in this area.
