= Hemi Rudner =

Israeli musical artist

Hemi Rudner חמי רודנר
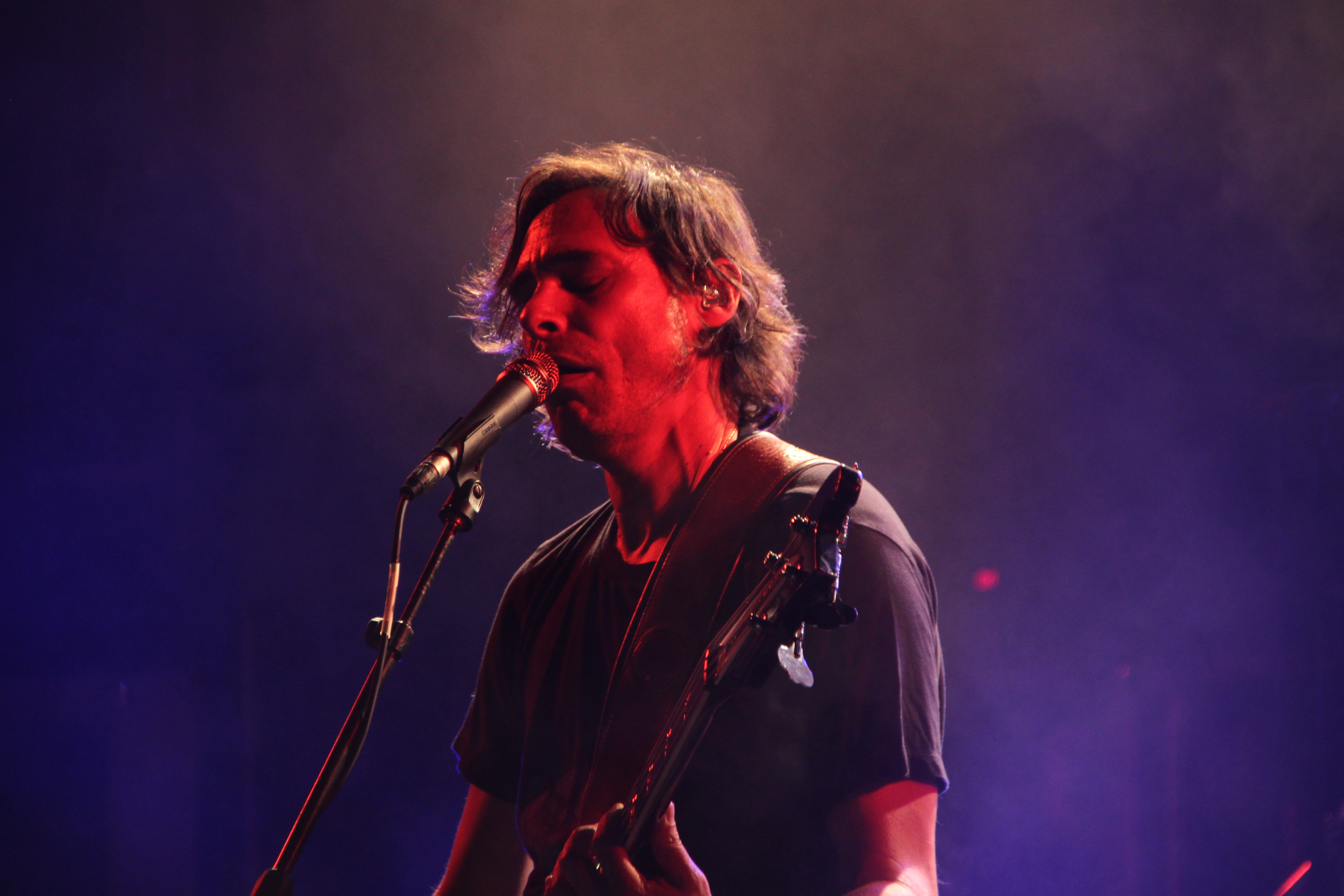

Background information
- Origin: Israel
- Genres: rock

Haim (Hemi) Rudner (Hebrew: חמי רודנר; born October 28, 1964) is an Israeli singer-songwriter and rock musician. Rudner was born and raised in Kibbutz Givat Brenner. He is also a member of Eifo HaYeled.

== Personal life ==
Between 1995 and 1999, Rudner was married to Iggy Waxman. In July 2007, he married his Australian partner, Karen, The couple have two daughters and a son. In 2021 the couple divorced.

== Discography ==
- גאולה (חמי רודנר ושליחי הבלוז) (2000)
- מלנכוליה אהובתי (2002)
- חמלה (2003)
- מכונת השירים הגדולה (2007)
- זמן אסיף (2013)
- יהומה (2019)
- חי שירים (2021)
