= Gibton =

Moshav in central Israel

Gibton: גִּבְּתוֹן (Hebrew)
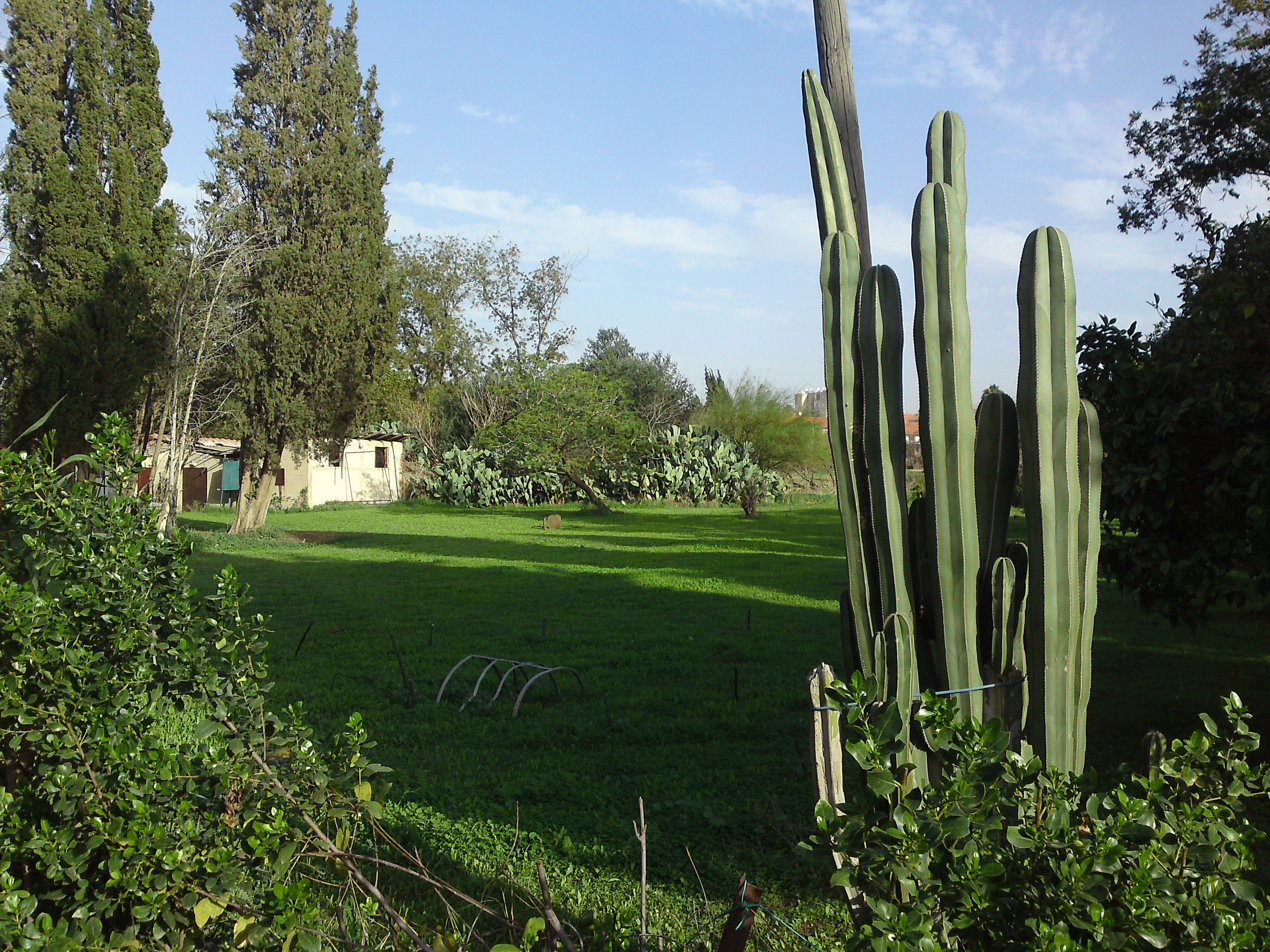

- Location within Central Israel
- Coordinates: 31°53′15″N 34°48′1″E
- Country: Israel
- District: Central
- Subdistrict: Rehovot
- Council: Brenner
- Affiliation: Unaffiliated
- Founded: 1933
- Population (2024): 405

Gibton (Hebrew: גִּבְּתוֹן, lit. 'Finch') is a moshav in central Israel. Located near Rehovot, it falls under the jurisdiction of Brenner Regional Council. In 2024 it had a population of 405.

== History ==
It was founded in 1933 as part of the Settlement of the Thousand plan. The plan aimed to establish small agricultural settlements around the larger towns and help defend them against Arab rioters. It was named after an ancient town in the territory of the Tribe of Dan which is mentioned in the Tanakh (Joshua 19:44) and is identified with Tel Malot some kilometers south-east. Following Rehovot's expansion after the 1948 Arab–Israeli War, it became an enclave within the city's perimeter.

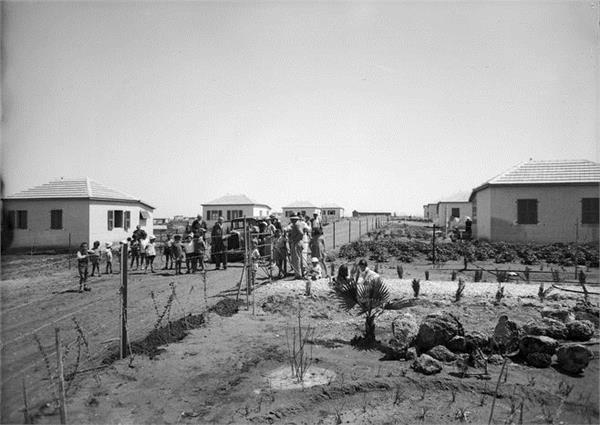
Gibton 1935

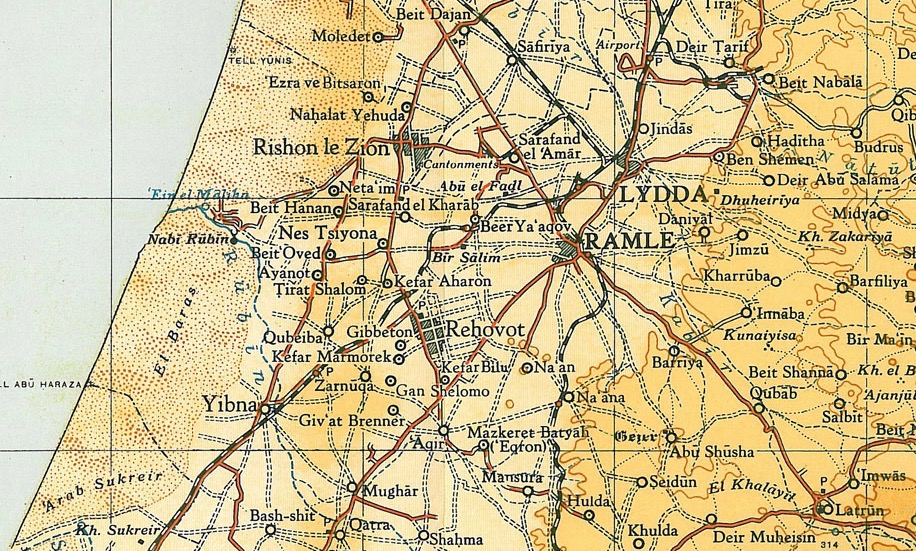
Gibton (Gibberton) 1945 1:250,000

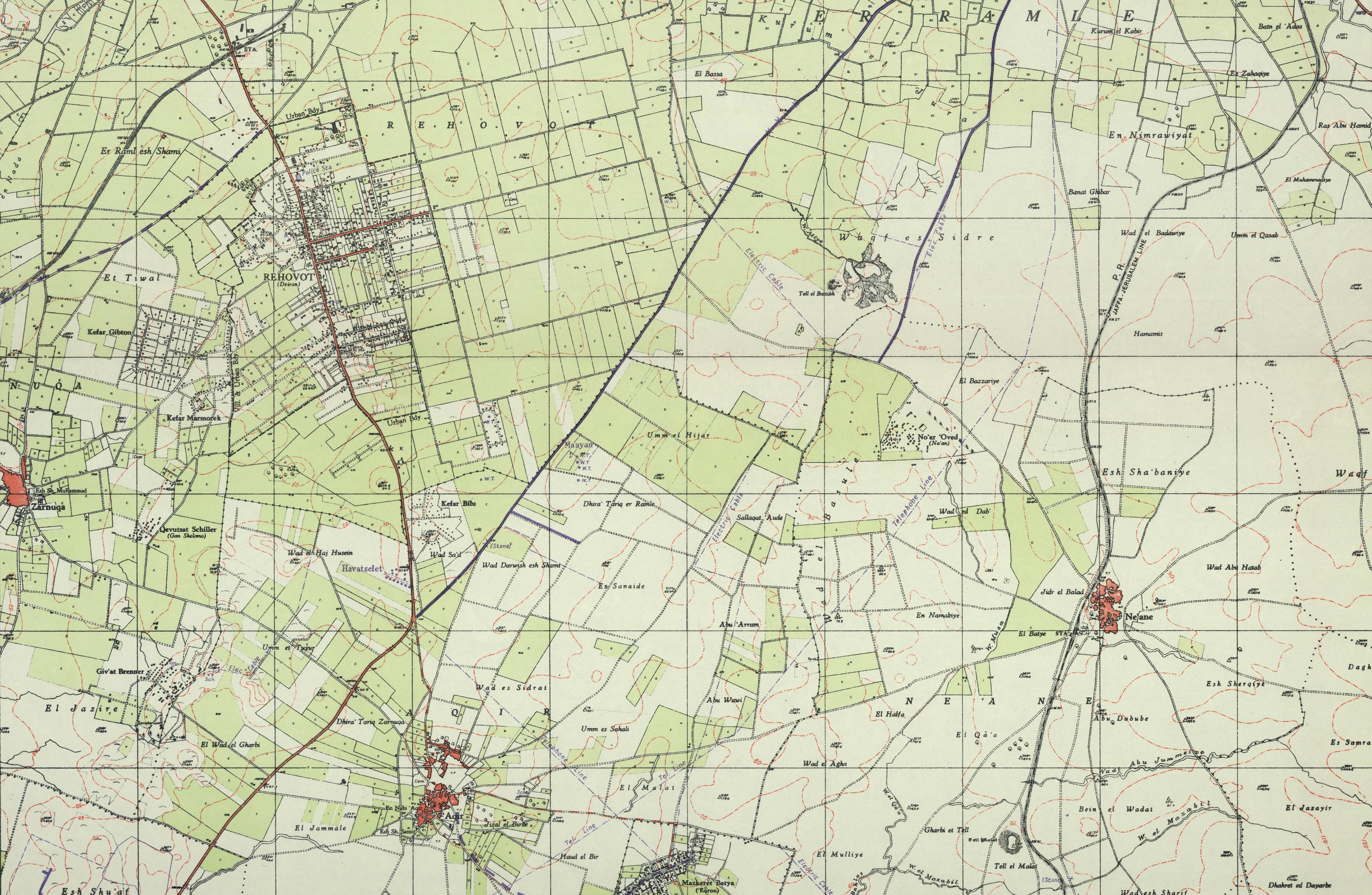
Gibton (Kefar Gibton) 1948 1:20,000
