= Kvutzat Shiller =

Kibbutz in central Israel

Kvutzat Shiller: קבוצת שילר (Hebrew)
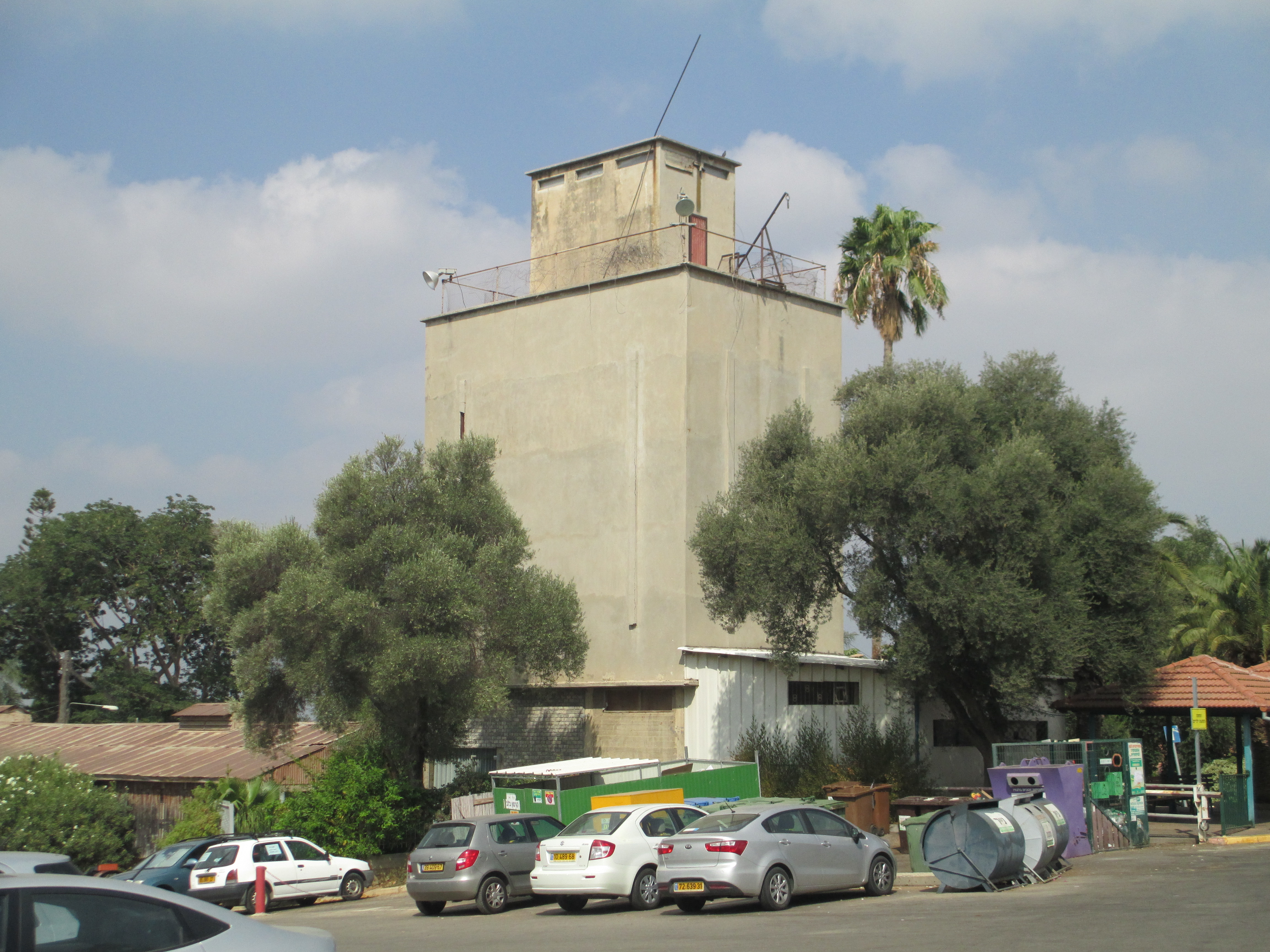

- Location within Central Israel Location within Israel
- Coordinates: 31°52′40″N 34°47′56″E
- Country: Israel
- District: Central
- Subdistrict: Rehovot
- Council: Brenner
- Affiliation: Kibbutz Movement
- Founded: October 1927
- Founder: Polish Jews
- Population (2024): 664
- Website: www.shiller.org.il

Kvutzat Shiller (Hebrew: קבוצת שילר), also known as Gan Shlomo, is a kibbutz in central Israel. Located in the Shephelah near Rehovot, it falls under the jurisdiction of Brenner Regional Council. In 2024 it had a population of 664.

== History ==
The kibbutz was founded as a kvutza in October 1927 by a group of 12 academics from Lwów and Galicia and their six children. This was after the group had spent two years of agricultural training in Kiryat Anavim. The new settlement was named after Shlomo Shiller, a Zionist activist in Lwów.

In the early 1930s the residents requested more land to expand the kibbutz. The authorities agreed but demanded that the village adopt a Hebrew name. Although the name Gan Shlomo was approved by the authorities and is still used on official maps and documents, the residents still refer to it by its original name.

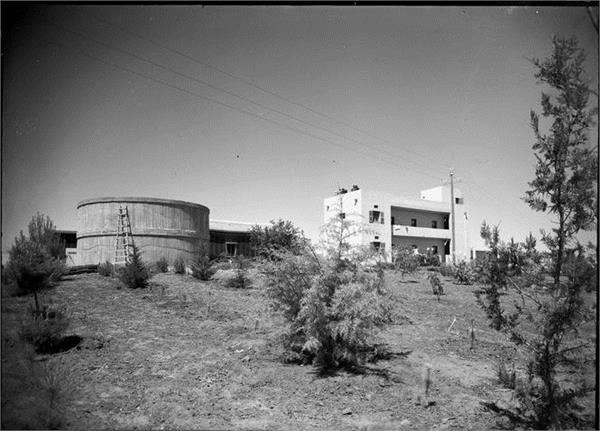
Gan Shlomo 1935

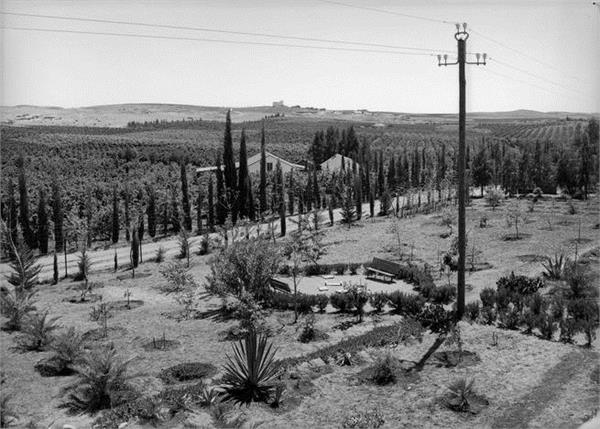
Kvutzat Shiller 1935

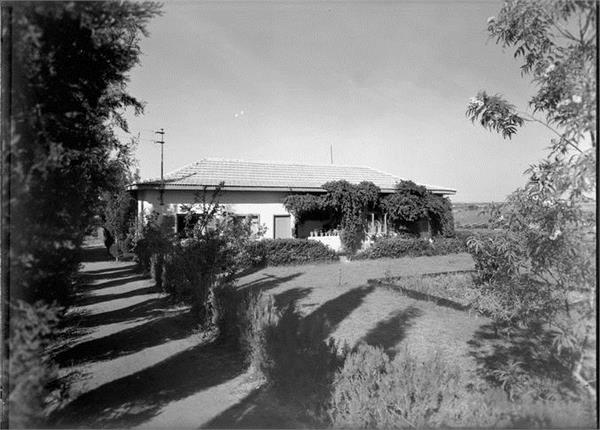
Kvutzat Shiller 1935

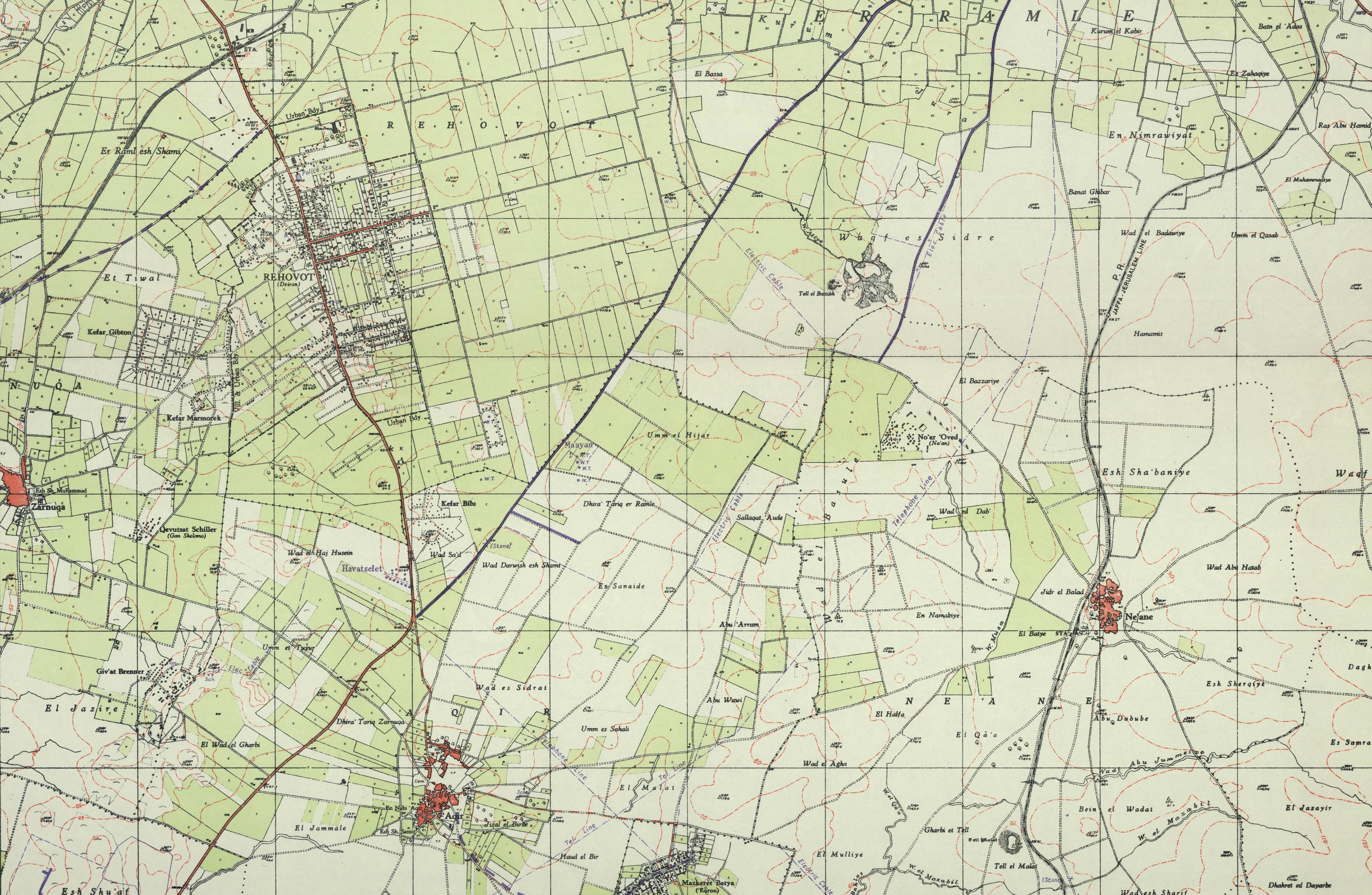
Kvutzat Shiller (Qevutsat Schiller) 1948 1:20,000 (SW of Rehovot)
