= Jamnia =

Jamnia may refer to:

- Yavne, city in the Central District of Israel adjacent to the ancient site at Tel Yavne/Yibna
  - Council of Jamnia, a hypothetical Jewish council in the 1st century CE
- Yibna, the former Arab village at Tel Yavne
- Jamnith (Jamnia in Galilee), ancient city in Upper Galilee, now ruin
- Jamnia Jagir, former estate in the Bhopawar Agency of British India

== See also ==
- Gan Yavne, town in Israel
- Hevel Yavne Regional Council, administrative unit in southern Israel
- Kerem Yavne, youth village and yeshiva in Israel
- Kvutzat Yavne, religious kibbutz in Israel
