= Arab Suqrir =

'Arab Sukrir عرب سكرير 'Arab Abu Suwayrih, Abu Sweirah
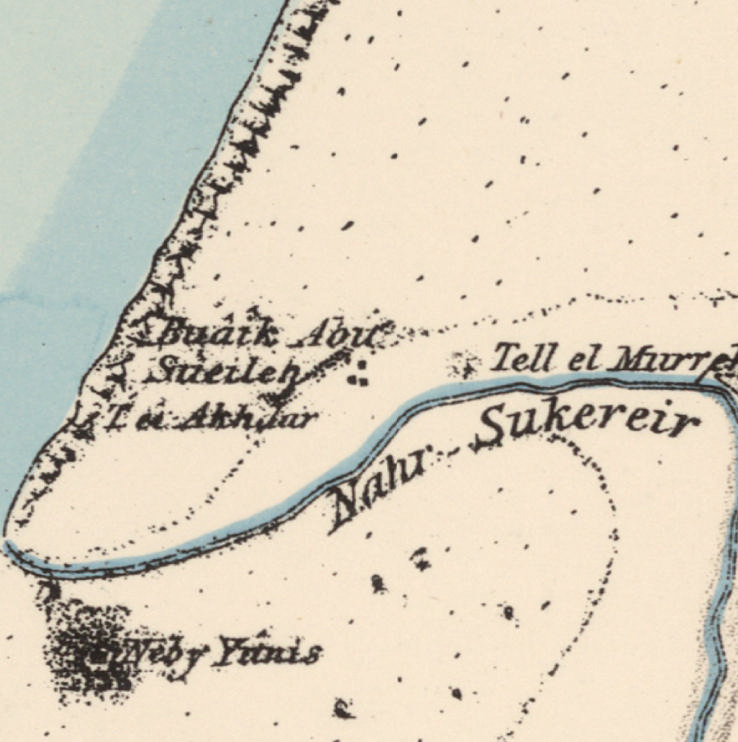
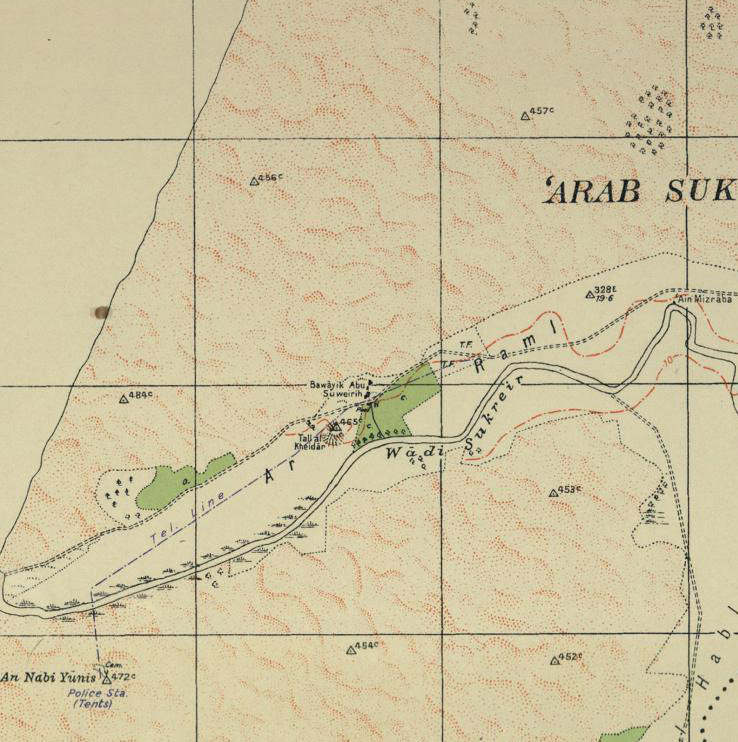
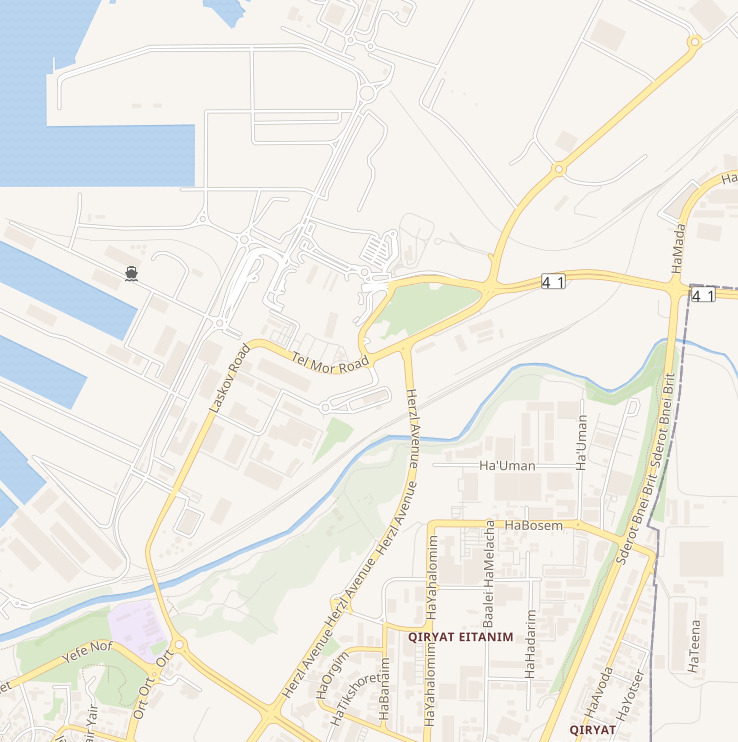
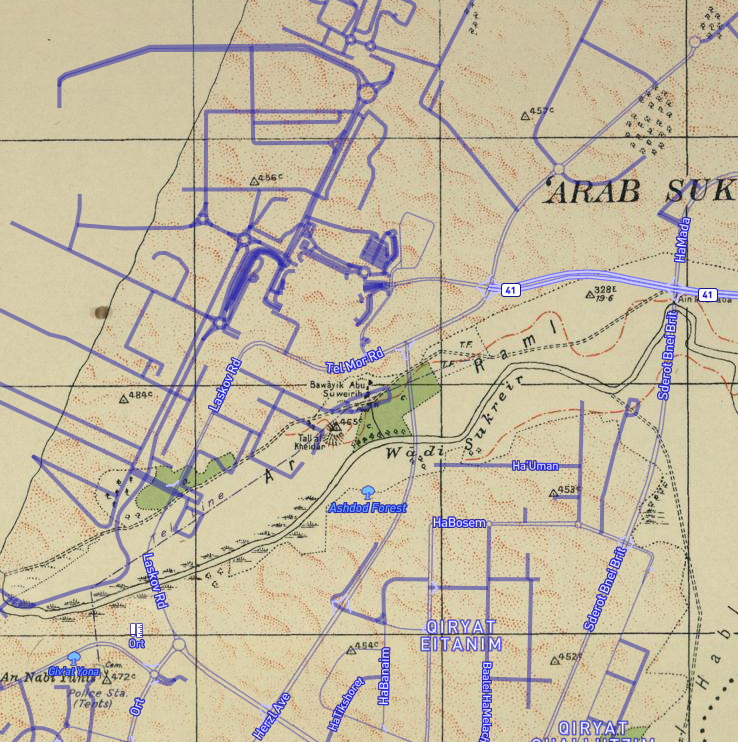
- 1870s map 1940s map modern map 1940s with modern overlay map A series of historical maps of the area around Arab Suqrir (click the buttons)

- Location within Mandatory Palestine
- Coordinates: 31°49′31″N 34°39′28″E
- Palestine grid: 121/136
- Geopolitical entity: Mandatory Palestine
- Subdistrict: Gaza
- Date of depopulation: 25 May 1948

Area
  - Total: 40,224 dunams (40.224 km^{2}; 15.531 sq mi)

Population (1945)
  - Total: 390
- Cause(s) of depopulation: Military assault by Yishuv forces
- Current Localities: Bnei Darom Netivot Nir Galim, Ashdod

'Arab Sukrir (Arabic: عرب سكرير) was a Palestinian Arab village in the Gaza Subdistrict, located 38 kilometers (24 mi) northeast of Gaza in a flat area with an elevation of 25 meters (82 ft) along the coastal plain just north of Isdud. The total land area of the village was 40,224 dunams, of which 12,270 was Arab-owned, while the remainder was public property. In 1931, it had a population of 530, decreasing to 390 in 1945. It was destroyed and depopulated during the 1948 Arab-Israeli War.

== History ==
The latter part of the town's name, 'Arab Sukrir could have derived from the Canaanite name of the site, "Shakrun".

Al-Maqrizi mentions Sukrir as a place that the new amir Lajin passed through on his return to Egypt, after the defeat of his rival the sultan Kitbagha in 1296 C.E

=== Ottoman era ===
Under the Ottoman Empire, in 1596, it was under the administration of the nahiya of Gaza, part of the Liwa of Gaza. With a population of 55 (10 households), all Muslims. The villagers paid taxes on wheat, barley, sesame, beehives, and goats; a total of 2,000 Akçe. The original inhabitants of the village were Muslim Bedouins who gradually settled on the site, built stone houses, and became farmers.

Arab Sukrir was mainly inhabited the Bedouin tribe of 'Arab al-Malaliha (Arabic: عرب الملالحة) of the Bani 'Amir confederation, who inhabited the sand dunes. They depended on livestock, transportation, and basic agriculture for survival. Due to their transient lifestyle and modest material possessions, they have left behind only faint archaeological traces.

By the mid-19th century, the caravanserai at Sukrīr had fallen into ruin following the decline of the old caravan road linking Damascus and Cairo.

According to Socin found from an official Ottoman village list from about 1870 showed that the place (called Abu Suweirih) had 41 houses and a population of 105, though the population count included men, only. Hartmann disagreed both about the number of houses, and the identification. Excavations at the site, today called Tel Mor, revealed traces of Late Ottoman infant jar-burials, commonly associated with nomads or itinerant workers of Egyptian origins.

=== British Mandate era ===
In the 1931 census of Palestine, conducted by the British Mandate authorities, Abu Sweirah had a population of 530 Muslims.

In the 1945 statistics the population of Arab Sukrir consisted of 390 Muslims and the land area was 40,224 dunams, according to an official land and population survey. Of this, 583 dunams were designated for citrus and bananas, 489 for plantations and irrigable land, 15,538 for cereals, while 966 dunams were non-cultivable.

=== 1948 and aftermath ===
On January 11, 1948, 'Arab Sukrir was subject to the first Haganah operational proposal to level a village. An intelligence report reveals an official recommendation that "The village should be destroyed and some males from the same village should be murdered." According to Israeli historian Benny Morris, the report was issued as a result of the killing of eleven Haganah scouts outside patrol at Gan Yavne by militiamen from 'Arab Sukrir on January 9. The recommendation of leveling the village was endorsed by Haganah intelligence director Ziama Divon who said "the Arabs in the area expect a reprisal... A lack of response on our part will be interpreted as a sign of weakness."

According to Palestinian historian Walid Khalidi, press accounts at the time told a different story. The New York Times quoted police sources saying that a party of Jews from nearby Yavne attacked "Wadi Sukrayr" with gunfire on January 9, adding that police arrived and counterattacked, resulting in the deaths of eight Arabs and twelve Jews. The Jaffa-based newspaper Filastin also reported an attack on the village on January 9.

On January 20, the official order was issued with directives to "... Destroy the well... destroy the village completely, kill all the adult males, and destroy the reinforcements that arrive." However, when the operation was carried out on January 25, the women and children had already evacuated a few days prior and the roughly 30 men who had remained to guard the village after hearing of the approach by the Haganah. Morris writes that the Israelis destroyed the houses, two trucks, and the nearby well, citing a report that said "The village, apart from a few relics, no longer exists." The Associated Press reported that the Haganah bombed fifteen or twenty houses in an Arab village near Yibna, but gave no casualty figures and quoted informants that the bombing were in retaliation for attacks on Jewish convoys.

The inhabitants of 'Arab Sukrir were angry that "no village dared to come to their help and they asked how could the Arabs fight this way." Some villagers returned to the site soon after its destruction and finally left at the end of March. The village came under the control of Israel by the Haganah's Givati Brigade around May 10, 1948, at the start of Operation Barak, but the village was not physically destroyed until August 24–25 in Operation Nikayon. Following the war the area was incorporated into the State of Israel.

Khalidi wrote that the village remains consist of "overgrown weeds, a few cactuses, and trees. Two houses remain standing. One of them is in a citrus grove and has a concrete frame and cinder block walls. On the top of the flat roof is an illiya." Two Jewish towns are currently located on the former land of 'Arab Sukrir: Nir Galim was established in 1949 and Ashdod was established in 1955.

=== Khan ===
According to Petersen, the village site is today located in the centre of the Bnei Darom moshav, with the remains of a khan located in a wooded park next to the water tower of the moshav. The khan ruins were first described by Victor Guérin, who inspected them in 1863, and who wrote the following description:

This ruin is that of a Khan, now overthrown. It is 60 paces long by 37 broad. It contains a cistern and a small vaulted magazine, as yet not destroyed. Below the hillock covered by its ruins I remarked on the east a reservoir and viaduct, a well partly fallen in, but well built. A canal, traces of which are alone visible, carried the water of the reservoir to a fountain, now demolished, and situated in the plain near the road

Clermont-Ganneau visited the place in 1873, and gave a very similar description, with the addition: "this must have been the site of some ancient "manzel", or posting-house, on the Arab route from Syria to Egypt.

The site was registered as "an ancient monument" during the British Mandate of Palestine-period, although the owners were permitted to build a reservoir 20m square within the khan.

Petersen, who inspected the place in 1994, found it in much the same condition as during the British mandate period, except that the reservoir had been replaced with a modern water-tower. He described the remains as comprising a nearly 40 m-long wall, running north–south, with an entrance near the north end. A barrel-vaulted chamber, with an interior measuring 8.3 m long and 3.8 m wide, is located inside the khan, just south of the entrance.

In 2002. excavations in Bnei Darom found major remains from the Mamluk period.

== See also ==
- Depopulated Palestinian locations in Israel

== Bibliography ==
- Barkan, Diego (2006-07-03). "Bene Darom Final Report". Hadashot Arkheologiyot – Excavations and Surveys in Israel (118).
- Clermont-Ganneau, C.S. (1896). [ARP] Archaeological Researches in Palestine 1873-1874, translated from the French by J. McFarlane. Vol. 2. London: Palestine Exploration Fund.
- Conder, C.R.; Kitchener, H.H. (1882). The Survey of Western Palestine: Memoirs of the Topography, Orography, Hydrography, and Archaeology. Vol. 2. London: Committee of the Palestine Exploration Fund.
- Department of Statistics (1945). Village Statistics, April, 1945. Government of Palestine.
- Guérin, V. (1869). Description Géographique Historique et Archéologique de la Palestine (in French). Vol. 1: Judee, pt. 2. Paris: L'Imprimerie Nationale.
- Hadawi, S. (1970). Village Statistics of 1945: A Classification of Land and Area ownership in Palestine. Palestine Liberation Organization Research Center.
- Hartmann, M. (1883). "Die Ortschaftenliste des Liwa Jerusalem in dem türkischen Staatskalender für Syrien auf das Jahr 1288 der Flucht (1871)". Zeitschrift des Deutschen Palästina-Vereins. 6: 102–149.
- Hütteroth, W.-D.; Abdulfattah, K. (1977). Historical Geography of Palestine, Transjordan and Southern Syria in the Late 16th Century. Erlanger Geographische Arbeiten, Sonderband 5. Erlangen, Germany: Vorstand der Fränkischen Geographischen Gesellschaft. ISBN 3-920405-41-2.
- Khalidi, W. (1992). All That Remains: The Palestinian Villages Occupied and Depopulated by Israel in 1948. Washington D.C.: Institute for Palestine Studies. ISBN 0-88728-224-5.
- Mills, E., ed. (1932). Census of Palestine 1931. Population of Villages, Towns and Administrative Areas. Jerusalem: Government of Palestine.
- Morris, B. (2004). The Birth of the Palestinian Refugee Problem Revisited. Cambridge University Press. ISBN 978-0-521-00967-6.
- Palmer, E. H. (1881). The Survey of Western Palestine: Arabic and English Name Lists Collected During the Survey by Lieutenants Conder and Kitchener, R. E. Transliterated and Explained by E.H. Palmer. Committee of the Palestine Exploration Fund. (p.281)
- Petersen, Andrew (2001). A Gazetteer of Buildings in Muslim Palestine (British Academy Monographs in Archaeology). Vol. 1. Oxford University Press. ISBN 978-0-19-727011-0.
- Socin, A. (1879). "Alphabetisches Verzeichniss von Ortschaften des Paschalik Jerusalem". Zeitschrift des Deutschen Palästina-Vereins. 2: 135–163.
