= Al-Qubayba =

Al-Qubayba may refer to:

- Al-Qubayba, Hebron
- Al-Qubayba, Ramle
- Al-Qubeiba, Jerusalem
