= Bnei Darom =

Moshav in central Israel

Bnei Darom: בְּנֵי דָּרוֹם (Hebrew)
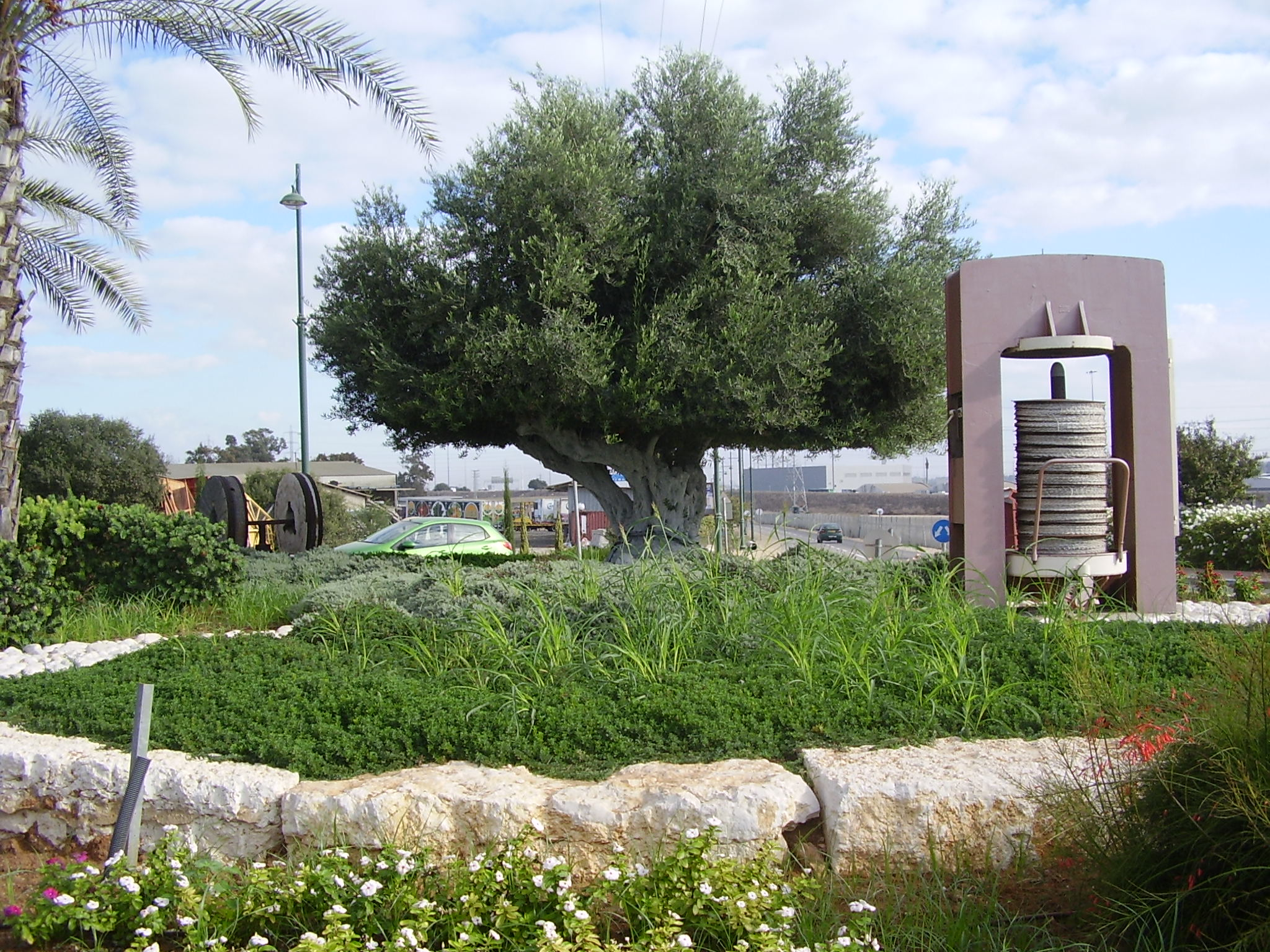

- Location within Ashkelon region of Israel Location within Israel
- Coordinates: 31°49′13″N 34°41′31″E
- Country: Israel
- District: Central
- Subdistrict: Rehovot
- Council: Hevel Yavne
- Affiliation: Religious Kibbutz Movement
- Founded: 1949
- Founder: Former residents of Kfar Darom
- Population (2024): 1,109
- Website: www.bnei-darom.com

Bnei Darom (Hebrew: בְּנֵי דָּרוֹם, lit. 'Sons of the South') is a religious moshav shitufi in central Israel. Located near the Mediterranean coast, it falls under the jurisdiction of Hevel Yavne Regional Council. In 2024 it had a population of 1,109.

== History ==
Bnei Darom was established in 1949 by members of the gar'in group Netivot Kfar Darom who had been forced out of Kibbutz Kfar Darom in the Gaza Strip when it was occupied by the Egyptian Army during the 1948 Arab–Israeli War. They were joined by another gar'in group, Morasha from the United States, though most of its members were not prepared for the kibbutz-style life in a moshav shitufi and left, some of them to form Beit Hazon. Originally affiliated with Hapoel HaMizrachi, it joined the Religious Kibbutz Movement as a moshav shitufi in 2007.

According to Walid Khalidi, Bnei Darom was founded on land located near Isdud. However, according to Andrew Petersen, it was on land located near the depopulated Palestinian village of Arab Suqrir, with the remains of a khan located in a wooded park next to the modern water tower. The khan ruins were first described by Victor Guérin, who inspected them in 1863, and who wrote the following description:

This ruin is that of a Khan, now overthrown. It is 60 paces long by 37 broad. It contains a cistern and a small vaulted magazine, as yet not destroyed. Below the hillock covered by its ruins I remarked on the east a reservoir and viaduct, a well partly fallen in, but well built. A canal, traces of which are alone visible, carried the water of the reservoir to a fountain, now demolished, and situated in the plain near the road

Clermont-Ganneau visited the place in 1873, and gave a very similar description, with the addition: "this must have been the site of some ancient "manzel", or posting-house, on the Arab route from Syria to Egypt.

The site was registered as "an ancient monument" during the Mandate era, although the owners were permitted to build a reservoir 20m square within the khan.

Petersen, inspecting the place in 1994, found it in much the same condition as during the Mandate period, except that the reservoir had been replaced with a water-tower. Petersen described the remains as comprising a nearly 40m long wall, running north-south, with an entrance near the north end. A barrel-vaulted chamber, with an interior measuring 8.3m long and 3.8m wide, is located inside the khan, just south of the entrance.

In 2002 excavations in the moshav found major remains from the Mamluk period.

== Bibliography ==
- Barkan, Diego (2006-07-03). "Bene Darom Final Report" (118). Hadashot Arkheologiyot – Excavations and Surveys in Israel.
- Clermont-Ganneau, C.S. (1896). [ARP] Archaeological Researches in Palestine 1873-1874, translated from the French by J. McFarlane. Vol. 2. London: Palestine Exploration Fund.
- Conder, C.R.; Kitchener, H.H. (1882). The Survey of Western Palestine: Memoirs of the Topography, Orography, Hydrography, and Archaeology. Vol. 2. London: Committee of the Palestine Exploration Fund.
- Guérin, V. (1869). Description Géographique Historique et Archéologique de la Palestine. Vol. 1: Judee, pt. 2. (pp. 126-127 )
- Khalidi, W. (1992). All That Remains: The Palestinian Villages Occupied and Depopulated by Israel in 1948. Washington D.C.: Institute for Palestine Studies. ISBN 0-88728-224-5.
- Petersen, Andrew (2001). A Gazetteer of Buildings in Muslim Palestine: Volume I (British Academy Monographs in Archaeology). Oxford University Press. ISBN 978-0-19-727011-0.
