= Ben Zakai =

Moshav in central Israel

Ben Zakai: בֶּן זַכַּאי (Hebrew)
- Location within Central Israel Location within Israel
- Coordinates: 31°51′21″N 34°43′48″E
- Country: Israel
- District: Central
- Subdistrict: Rehovot
- Council: Hevel Yavne
- Affiliation: Hapoel HaMizrachi
- Founded: 1950
- Founder: Libyan Jewish refugees
- Population (2024): 1,025

Ben Zakai (Hebrew: בֶּן זַכַּאי) is a religious moshav in central Israel. Located just south of Yavne, it falls under the jurisdiction of Hevel Yavne Regional Council. In 2024 it had a population of 1,025.

== History ==
The Ben Zakai moshav was established in 1950 by Jewish refugees from Tripoli (in modern Libya) on land near the depopulated Arab village of Yibna, and was named after Yochanan ben Zakai.
