= Givat Washington =

Youth village in central Israel

Givat Washington: גִבְעַת וָשִינְגְטוֹן (Hebrew)
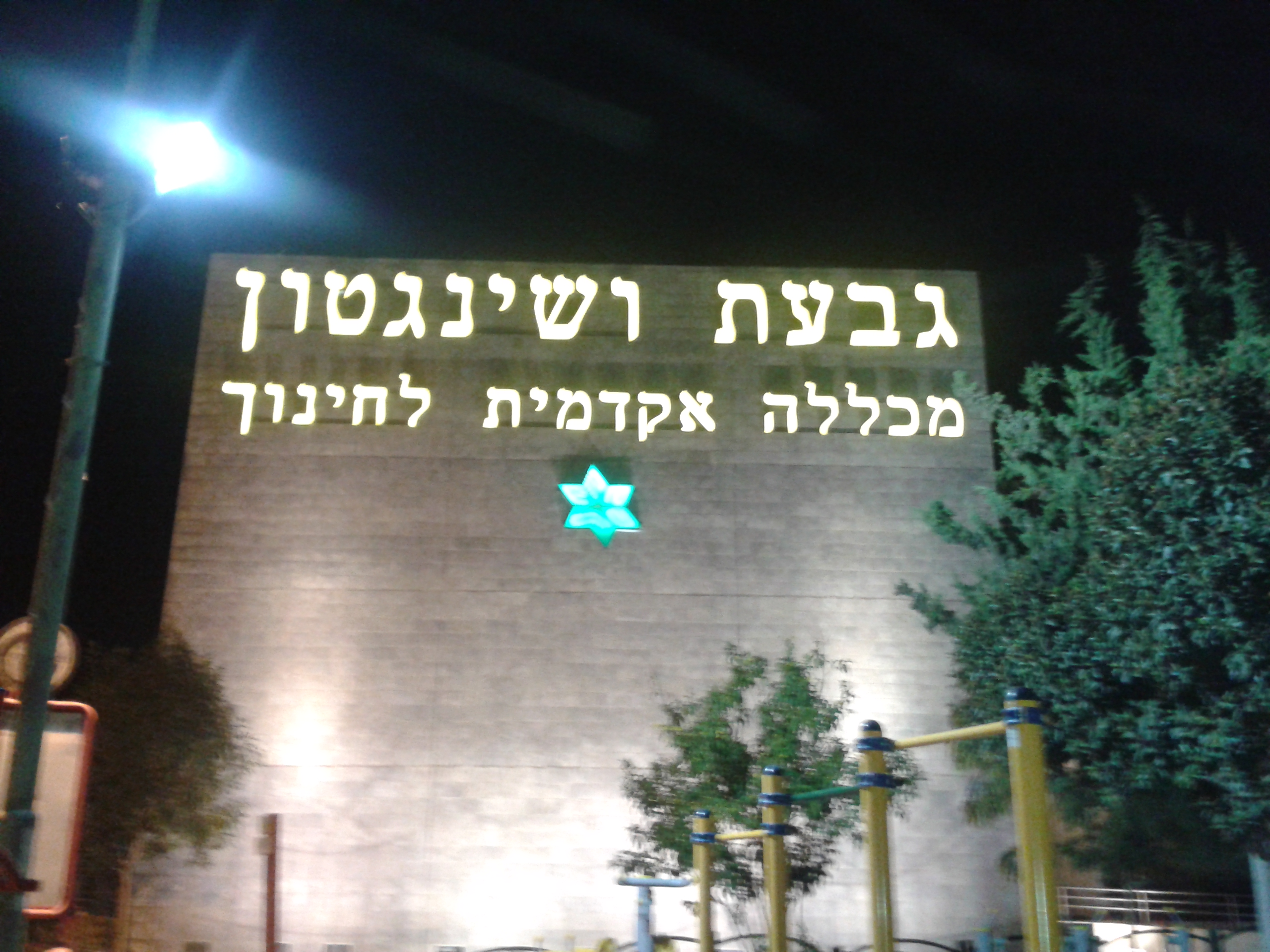

- Location within Central Israel
- Coordinates: 31°49′3″N 34°43′44″E
- Country: Israel
- District: Central
- Subdistrict: Rehovot
- Council: Hevel Yavne
- Founded: 1946
- Founder: Jewish community of Washington D.C.
- Population (2024): 561

Givat Washington (Hebrew: גִבְעַת וָשִינְגְטוֹן, lit. 'Washington Hill'), also known as Beit Raban (Hebrew: בֵּית רַבָּן, lit. 'House of Raban') is a religious youth village in central Israel. Located near Kvutzat Yavne, it falls under the jurisdiction of Hevel Yavne Regional Council. In 2024 it had a population of 561.

== History ==
The village was established in 1946 by the Jewish community of Washington D.C., and initially served as an educational establishment for young Holocaust survivors. It now has a secondary school, a midrasha, an ulpan and an academic college. There is also student housing for college students, who make up most of the current residents.

The Mizmor School of Music was established in 2010, offering a three-year program headed by Daniel Zamir. The Pardes School of Art at Givat Washington is an art school for members of the religious community.

Lycée français Guivat-Washington, a French high school is also located in Givat Washington.

== See also ==
- Education in Israel
