= Kfar HaNagid =

Moshav in central Israel

Kfar HaNagid: כְּפַר הַנָּגִיד (Hebrew)
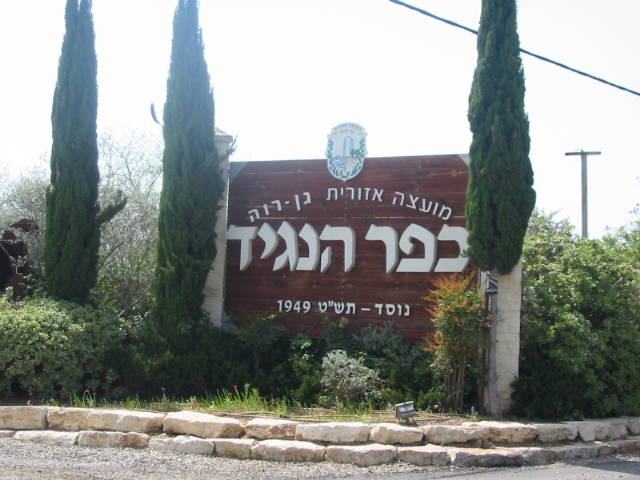

- Location within Central Israel Location within Israel
- Coordinates: 31°53′14″N 34°44′57″E
- Country: Israel
- District: Central
- Subdistrict: Rehovot
- Council: Gan Raveh
- Affiliation: Moshavim Movement
- Founded: 1949
- Founder: Bulgarian-Jewish immigrants
- Population (2024): 964

Kfar HaNagid (Hebrew: כְּפַר הַנָּגִיד, lit. 'Village of the Prince') is a moshav in central Israel. Located in the coastal plain around 20 km south of Tel Aviv and north of Yavne, it falls under the jurisdiction of Gan Raveh Regional Council. In 2024 it had a population of 964.

== History ==
The moshav was established in 1949 by immigrants from Bulgaria, and it was named after Samuel HaNagid. According to Benny Morris, the moshav is founded near the depopulated Palestinian village of al-Qubayba. Walid Khalidi writes that it is near both the al-Qubayba site and the Yibna site.
