= Hevel Yavne Regional Council =

Coordinates: 31°49′N 34°44′E

Hevel Yavne חבל יבנה
- Regional council (from 1950)
- Interactive map of Hevel Yavne
- Country: Israel
- District: Central
- Subdistrict: Rehovot
- Natural region: Rehovot

Government
  - Head of Municipality: Moshe Liber

Area
  - Total: 34,840 dunams (34.84 km^{2}; 13.45 sq mi)

Population (2024)
  - Total: 6,574
  - Density: 188.7/km^{2} (488.7/sq mi)
- Website: Official website

Hevel Yavne Regional Council (Hebrew: מועצה אזורית חבל יבנה, Mo'atza Azorit Hevel Yavneh, lit. Yavne Region Regional Council) is a regional council in the Central District of Israel.

== History ==
The Hevel Yavne Regional Council was formed in 1950. It covers 32,000 dunams and six religious communities. Two yeshivas - Yeshivat Kerem BeYavne and Yeshivat Neve Herzog - are under its purview.

It is bordered to the north by Yavne and Gan Raveh Regional Council; to the east by Gederot Regional Council and Brenner Regional Council; to the south by Be'er Tuvia Regional Council, and to the west by Ashdod.

== List of communities ==
The council covers one kibbutz, four moshavim and two youth villages;

Kibbutz

- Kvutzat Yavne

Moshavim

- Beit Gamliel
- Ben Zakai
- Bnei Darom
- Nir Galim

Youth village

- Givat Washington
- Yeshivat Kerem B'Yavneh

== Demographics ==
Historical population
Year	Pop.	±%
1972	2,300	—
1983	2,300	+0.0%
1995	2,900	+26.1%
2008	5,320	+83.4%
2022	6,389	+20.1%
2024	6,574	+2.9%

== Voting Patterns ==
In the 2022 election, 80 percent of voters in the regional council voted for the parties of the right-wing coalition led by Benjamin Netanyahu, while 20 percent voted for the parties of the center-left coalition led by Yair Lapid and 0.1 percent voted for the Arab parties.

In the 2026 election, 63 percent of voters in the regional council voted for the parties of the right-wing coalition led by Benjamin Netanyahu, while 23 percent voted for the parties of the center-left coalition led by Gadi Eisenkot and 0.1 percent voted for the Arab parties. An additional 5 percent voted for the Reservists, and 7.6 percent voted for Amcha Yisrael. Voter turnout increased 10 percent from the 2022 election.
