= Al-Qubayba, Ramle =

Arab village in Mandatory Palestine

Al-Qubayba القبيبة
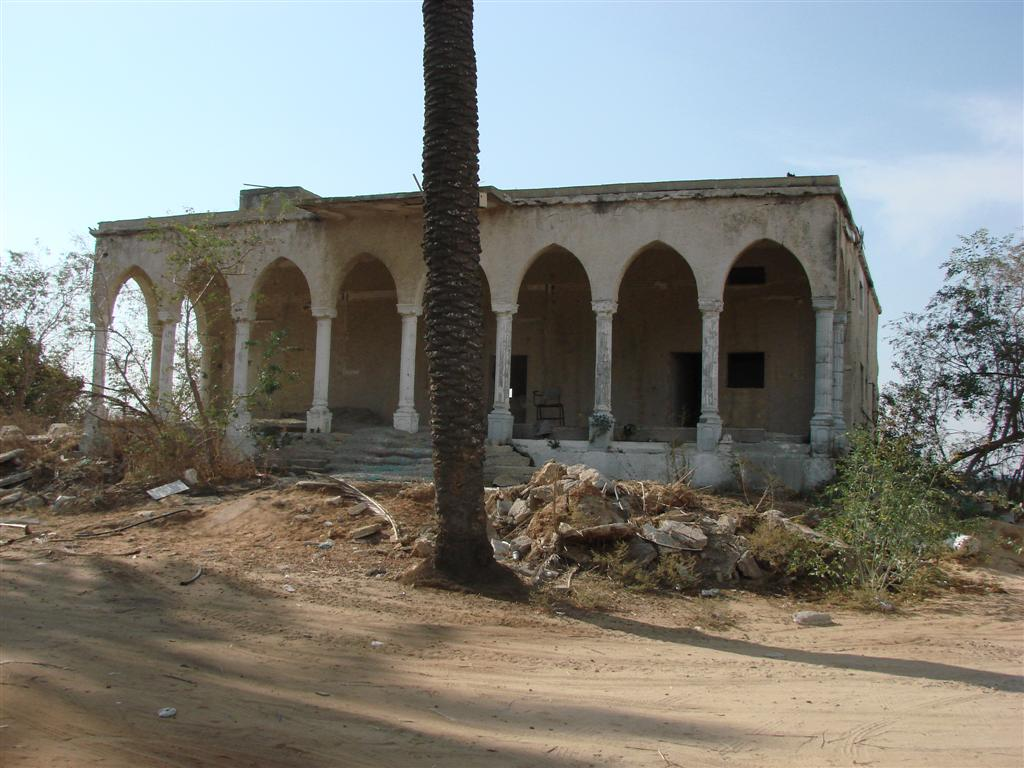
- Relic of a house built in Al-Qubayba before 1948
- Etymology: The little dome
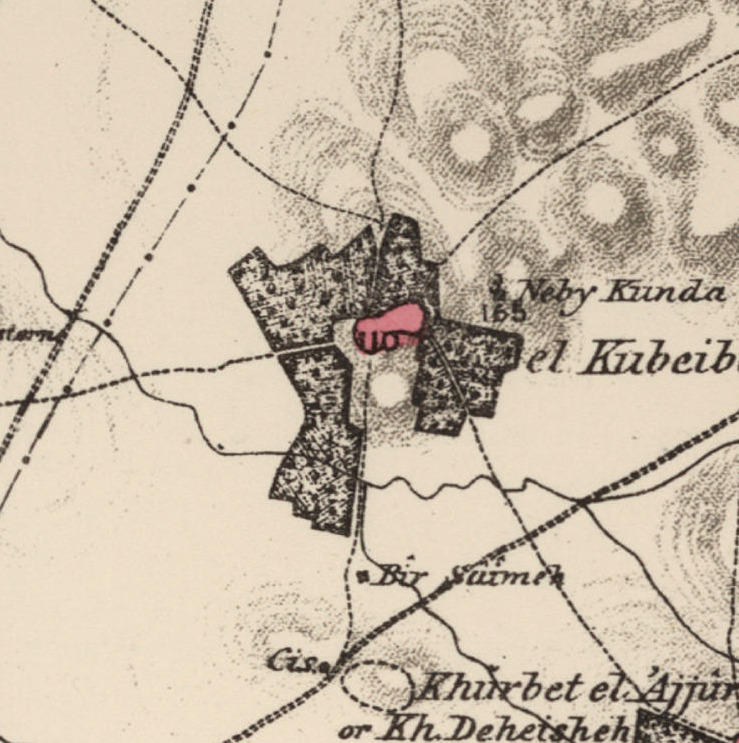
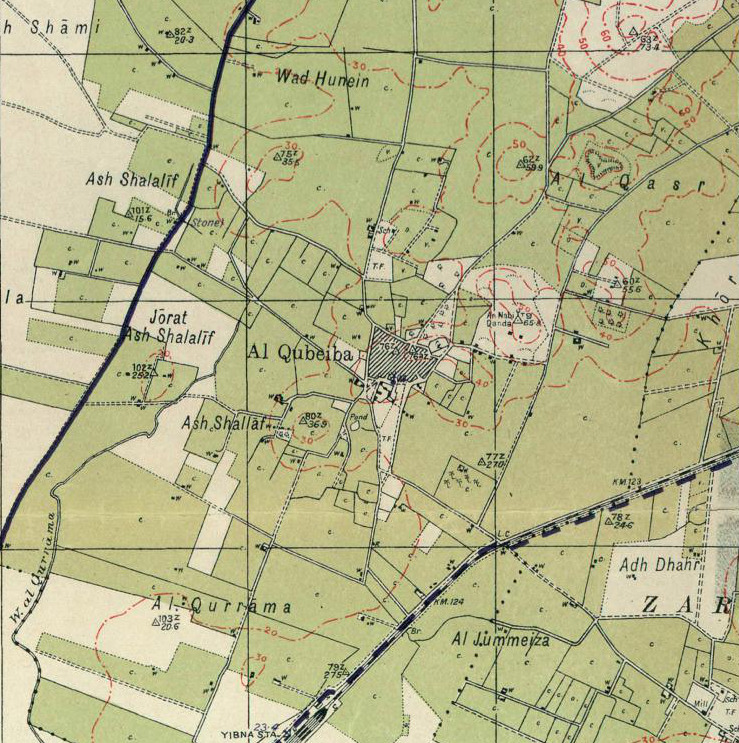
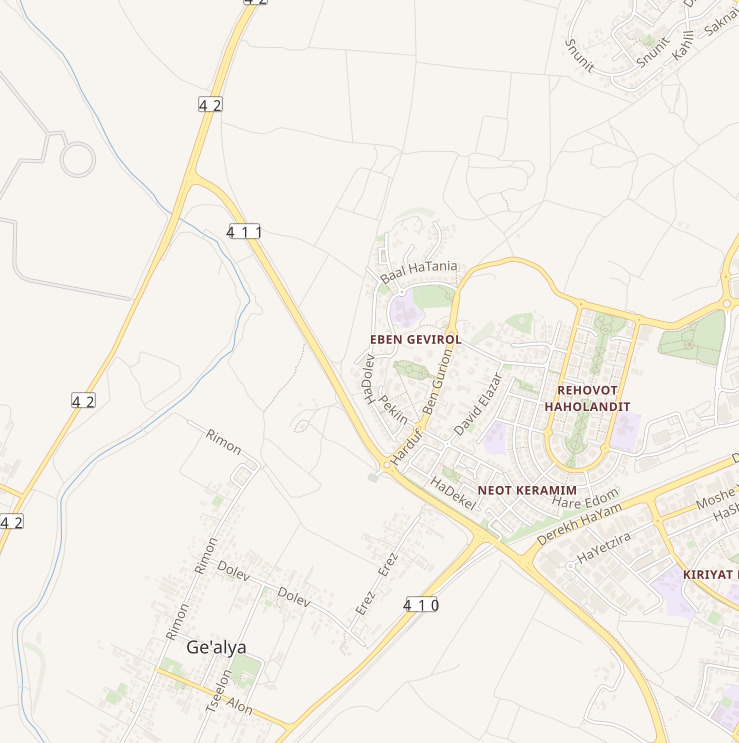
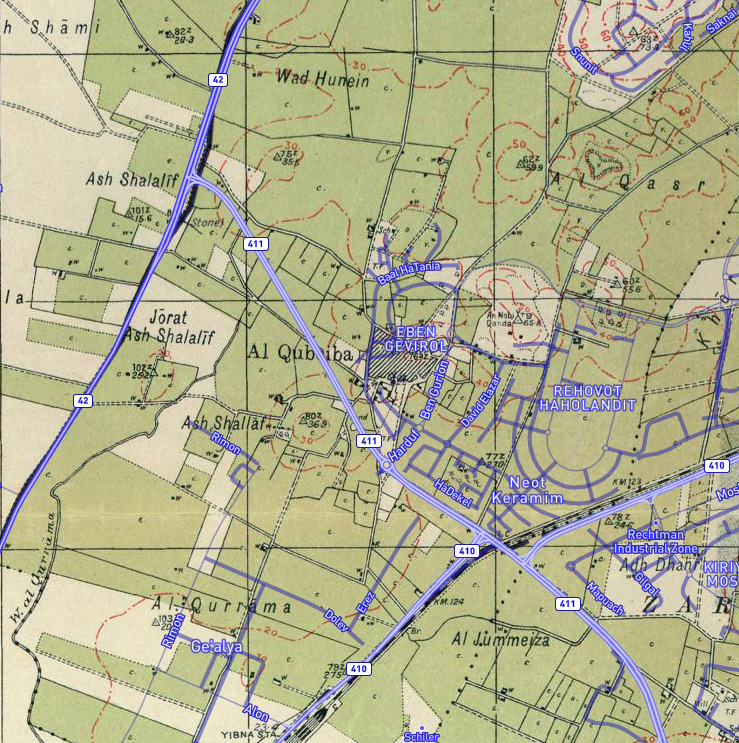
- 1870s map 1940s map modern map 1940s with modern overlay map A series of historical maps of the area around Al-Qubayba, Ramle (click the buttons)

- Location within Mandatory Palestine
- Coordinates: 31°53′41″N 34°46′17″E
- Palestine grid: 128/144
- Geopolitical entity: Mandatory Palestine
- Subdistrict: Ramle
- Date of depopulation: May 27–28, 1948

Area
  - Total: 10,737 dunams (10.737 km^{2}; 4.146 sq mi)

Population (1945)
  - Total: 1,720
- Cause(s) of depopulation: Expulsion by Yishuv forces
- Current Localities: Ge'alya; Kfar Gevirol; Kefar Hanaggid is near settlement land, but located on land belonging to Yibna

Al-Qubayba (Arabic: القبيبة) was a Palestinian Arab village in the Ramle Subdistrict. It was depopulated during the 1948 Arab-Israeli War on May 27, 1948, by the Givati Brigade as part of the Second stage of Operation Barak. It was located 10.5 km southeast of Ramla near the Rubin River (or Wadi al-Sarar) which provided the village with water and irrigation for agriculture. Al-Qubayba was mostly destroyed with the exception of a few houses, and Kfar Gevirol was built in its place, now a suburb in the west of Rehovot.

== History ==
=== Ottoman Empire ===
In the late Ottoman era, Pierre Jacotin noted it as an unnamed village on his map from 1799.

In 1863, Victor Guérin found the village to contains four hundred and fifty inhabitants. The houses were grouped together on a hill, and surrounded by gardens planted with figs, olives, cucumbers, and tobacco.

An Ottoman village list of about 1870 showed Kubebe with a population of 499, in 210 houses, though the population count included men, only.

In 1882, the PEF's Survey of Western Palestine described Kubeibeh as "a moderately large village, principally of mud, with cactus hedges surrounding gardens, standing on high ground. There is a well in the gardens to the east, and another to the south of the village."

During the final decades of Ottoman rule, the Shāhīn family of al-Qubayba possessed substantial properties in al-Qubayba, Yibnā, and al-Nabī Rūbīn. Late Ottoman and British Mandate-period ceramics excavated at al-Qubayba parallel archaeological assemblages found at Yibnā.

=== British Mandate ===
An elementary school for boys was founded in 1929, and by 1945 it had an enrollment of 344 students.

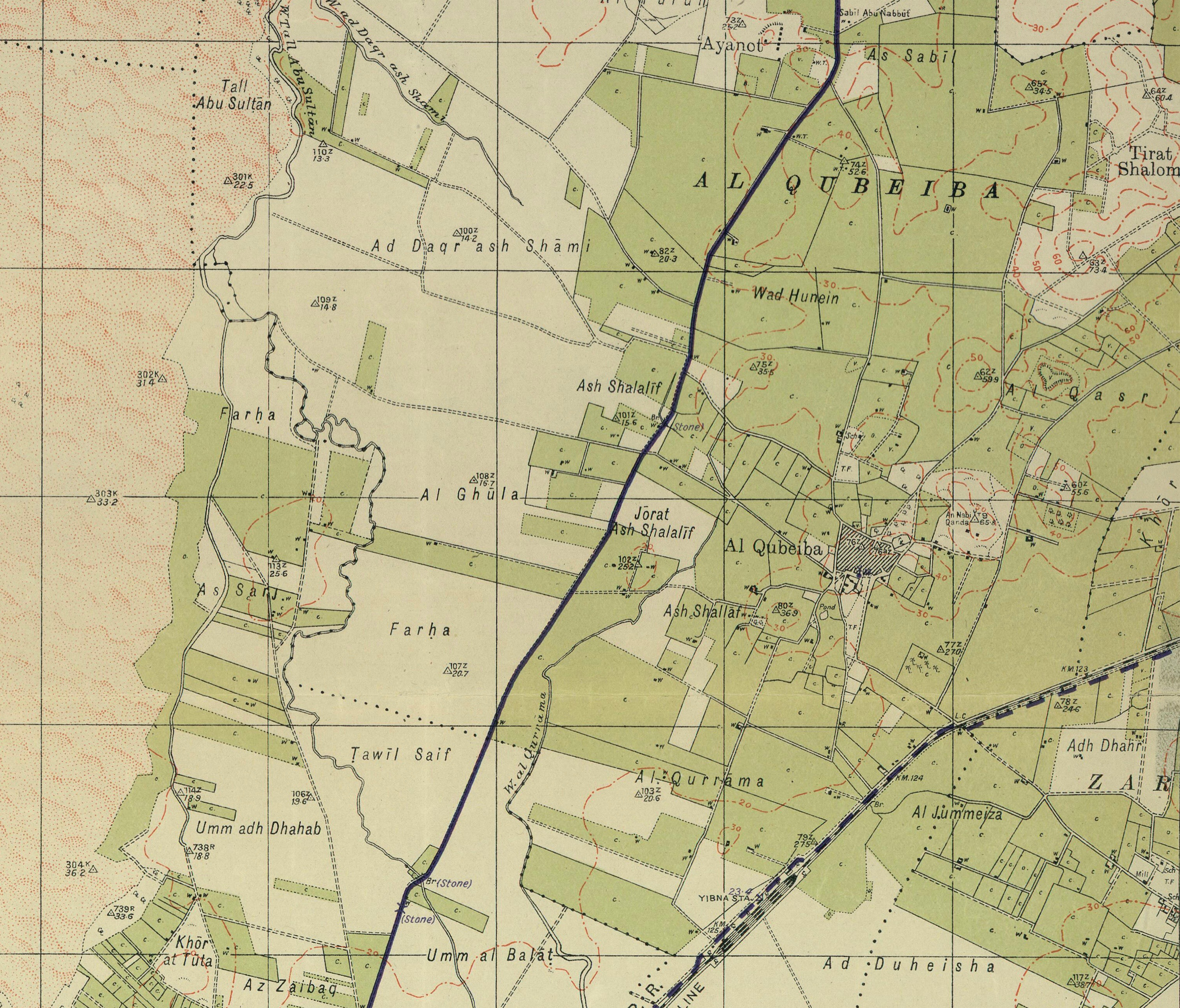
al Qubayba 1941 1:20,000

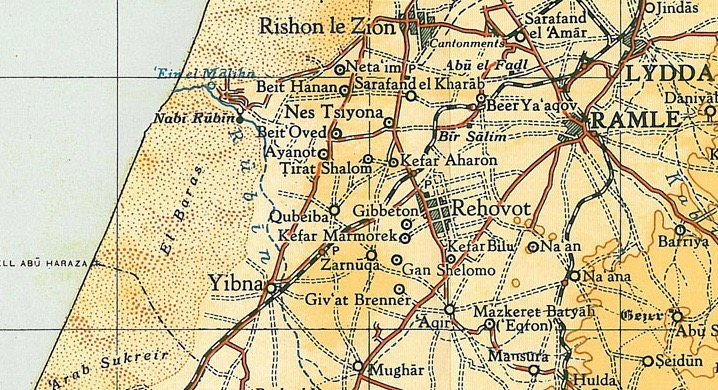
al Qubayba 1945 1:250,000

In the 1931 census of Palestine, conducted by the British Mandate authorities, El Qubeiba had 799 Muslim inhabitants in 160 houses.

In the 1945 statistics, the village had a population of 1,720 Muslims, and the total land area was 10,737 dunams. Of this, Arabs used 4,639 dunams for citrus and bananas, 1,143 dunums were irrigated or used for orchards, 2,972 dunums were allocated to cereals, while 43 dunams were classified as built-up urban areas.

=== Israel ===
The village was depopulated by the Israeli army in 1948. Houses that were not destroyed were soon occupied by Jewish immigrants. Over time it became a community called Kfar Gevirol, later incorporated into Rehovot as a neighborhood called Ibn Gevirol. The mosque was converted into a synagogue which collapsed in the 1980s.

The Israeli moshav of Ge'alya was also constructed on village land.

In 1992 the village site was described: "The walls and rubble of collapsed houses intermingle with the buildings of the Israeli settlements that have been established on the site. A former pool is used as a garbage dump. Some houses remain. One house, occupied by Jewish residents, is of modest size and is made of masonry; the beams that support its flat roof protrude slightly from the masonry of the exterior walls. Another village house is now used as a restaurant. Part of the school, a long building with a rectangular door and windows, still stands. Cactus hedges and sycamore and palm trees grow on the southern edge of the site."

== Bibliography ==
- Barron, J.B., ed. (1923). Palestine: Report and General Abstracts of the Census of 1922. Government of Palestine.
- Conder, C.R.; Kitchener, H.H. (1882). The Survey of Western Palestine: Memoirs of the Topography, Orography, Hydrography, and Archaeology. Vol. 2. London: Committee of the Palestine Exploration Fund.
- Government of Palestine, Department of Statistics (1945). Village Statistics, April, 1945.
- Goldwasser, Orly (1992). "On the Date of Seth from Qubeibeh". Israel Exploration Journal. 42: 47–52.
- Guérin, V. (1869). Description Géographique Historique et Archéologique de la Palestine (in French). Vol. 1: Judee, pt. 2. Paris: L'Imprimerie Nationale.
- Hadawi, S. (1970). Village Statistics of 1945: A Classification of Land and Area ownership in Palestine. Palestine Liberation Organization Research Center. Archived from the original on 2018-12-08.
- Hartmann, M. (1883). "Die Ortschaftenliste des Liwa Jerusalem in dem türkischen Staatskalender für Syrien auf das Jahr 1288 der Flucht (1871)". Zeitschrift des Deutschen Palästina-Vereins. 6: 102–149.
- Karmon, Y. (1960). "An Analysis of Jacotin's Map of Palestine" (PDF). Israel Exploration Journal. 10 (3, 4): 155–173, 244–253. Archived from the original (PDF) on 2017-12-01.
- Khalidi, W. (1992). All That Remains: The Palestinian Villages Occupied and Depopulated by Israel in 1948. Washington D.C.: Institute for Palestine Studies. ISBN 0-88728-224-5.
- Mills, E., ed. (1932). Census of Palestine 1931. Population of Villages, Towns and Administrative Areas. Jerusalem: Government of Palestine.
- Morris, B. (2004). The Birth of the Palestinian Refugee Problem Revisited. Cambridge University Press. ISBN 978-0-521-00967-6.
- Palmer, E.H. (1881). The Survey of Western Palestine: Arabic and English Name Lists Collected During the Survey by Lieutenants Conder and Kitchener, R. E. Transliterated and Explained by E.H. Palmer. Committee of the Palestine Exploration Fund.
- Socin, A. (1879). "Alphabetisches Verzeichniss von Ortschaften des Paschalik Jerusalem". Zeitschrift des Deutschen Palästina-Vereins. 2: 135–163.
