= Beit Gamliel =

Moshav in central Israel

Beit Gamliel: בֵּית גַּמְלִיאֵל (Hebrew)
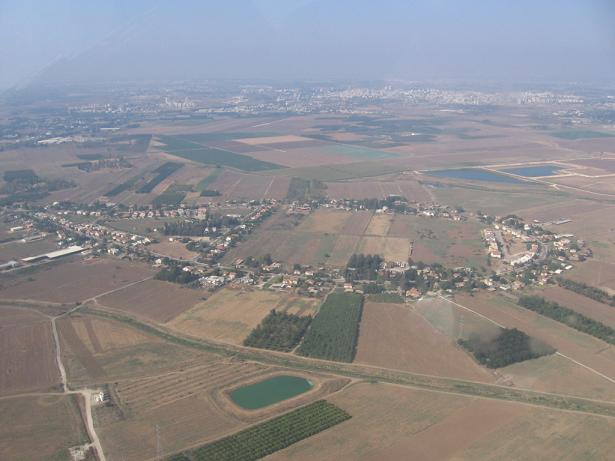
- Etymology: House of Gamliel
- Location within Central Israel Location within Israel
- Coordinates: 31°51′28″N 34°45′39″E
- Country: Israel
- District: Central
- Subdistrict: Rehovot
- Council: Hevel Yavne
- Affiliation: Hapoel HaMizrachi
- Founded: 1949
- Founder: Holocaust Survivors
- Population (2024): 987
- Website: www.beitgamliel.org.il

Beit Gamliel (Hebrew: בֵּית גַּמְלִיאֵל, lit. House of Gamliel) is a religious moshav in central Israel. Located south-east of Yavne, it falls under the jurisdiction of Hevel Yavne Regional Council. In 2024, it had a population of 987.

== History ==
The moshav was established in 1949 by Holocaust survivors from Romania, Czechoslovakia, Hungary and North Africa.

== Notable people ==
- Yehuda Barkan
- Rachel Azaria
- Matan Kahana
