= Kvutzat Yavne =

Kibbutz in central Israel

Kvutzat Yavne: קְבוּצַת יַבְנֶה (Hebrew)
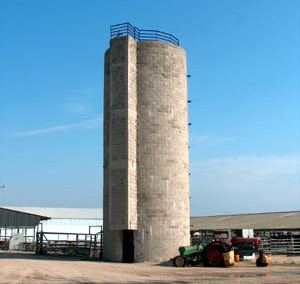

- Location within Central Israel Location within Israel
- Coordinates: 31°48′55″N 34°43′13″E
- Country: Israel
- District: Central
- Subdistrict: Rehovot
- Council: Hevel Yavne
- Affiliation: Religious Kibbutz Movement
- Founded: 1941
- Founder: German Jewish Refugees
- Population (2024): 1,120
- Website: www.yavnet.org.il

Kvutzat Yavne (Hebrew: קְבוּצַת יַבְנֶה) is a religious kibbutz in the Central District of Israel. Located in the coastal plain just east of Ashdod, it falls under the jurisdiction of Hevel Yavne Regional Council. In 2024 it had a population of 1,120. The kibbutz is adjacent to Yeshivat Kerem B'Yavneh.

== History ==
The idea of Kvutzat Yavne was conceived in Germany; and then originally called "Kvutzat Rodges". The intention of the founders was to make the area near ancient Yavne (from which it takes its name) the site of a religious kibbutz and a yeshiva.

These founders, members of the Religious Zionist movement—specifically, the Association of Religious Pioneers (בח"ד ברית חלוצים דתיים) — began to prepare themselves for agricultural work on German farms in 1929.

Shortly thereafter, they immigrated to Mandate Palestine. They initially settled near Petah Tikva on land purchased by a Jewish-owned German company. Finally, in 1941, the 180-person group of German Zionists, began to build Kvutzat Yavne at its intended location. In the autumn of 1947, the kibbutz population numbered 360 people, including 171 adults and 112 children. The kibbutz continued to grow, joined by German, American, and Sabras. It came to be known as the cradle of the Religious Kibbutz Movement, with which the kibbutz is associated.

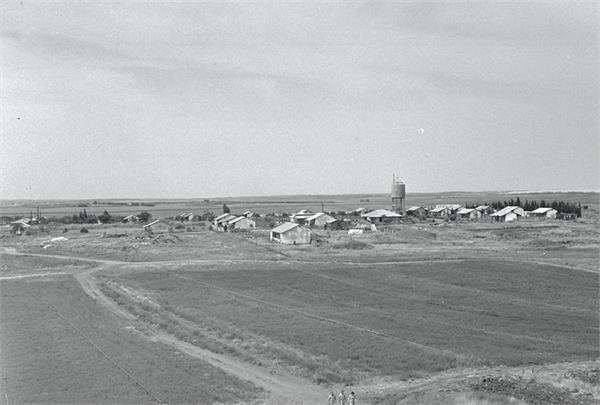
Yavne 1945

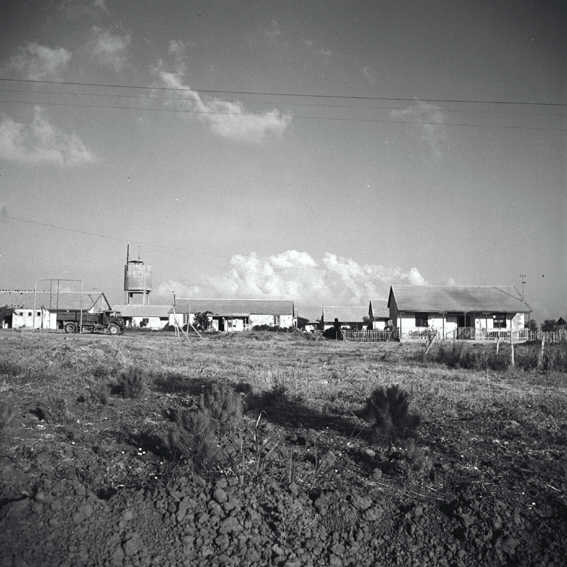
Yavne 1945

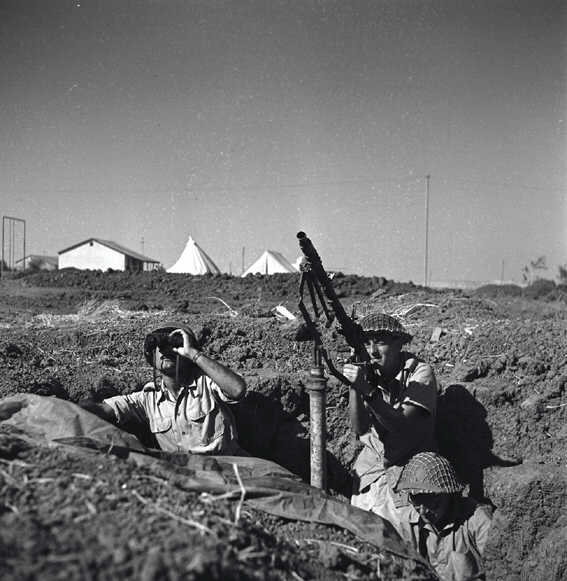
Yavne defence position 1947

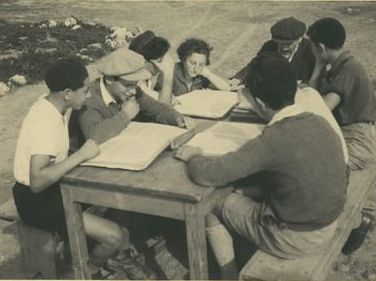
Members of the group studying the talmud

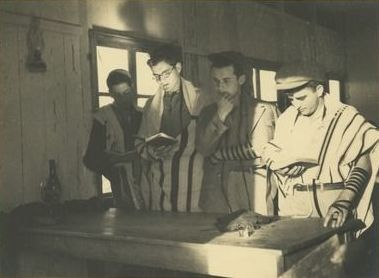
Members of the group during morning prayer

== Economy ==
Most of Yavne's agricultural production is in field crops, fruit orchards, poultry, and dairy, all contained within approximately 1,500 acres (6.1 km^{2}) of land. Major industry located on the kibbutz includes olive and cucumber processing plants, the Adi watch factory, and the largest chicken hatchery in the country (dispatching 600,000 chicks per day). As above, it is also the location of Yeshivat Kerem B'Yavneh, the first Hesder Yeshiva. The kibbutz used to run a Jewish studies program preparing candidates for conversion to Judaism, but this is no longer available. There was also a Hebrew language course (ulpan) for both Jewish students and converts (Gerim).

== Climate ==
Climate data for Kvutzat Yavne (1991–2020)
Month	Jan	Feb	Mar	Apr	May	Jun	Jul	Aug	Sep	Oct	Nov	Dec	Year
Record high °C (°F)	28.9 (84.0)	32.9 (91.2)	38.2 (100.8)	40.9 (105.6)	43.8 (110.8)	41.8 (107.2)	40.5 (104.9)	38.3 (100.9)	40.0 (104.0)	41.4 (106.5)	36.4 (97.5)	31.9 (89.4)	43.8 (110.8)
Mean daily maximum °C (°F)	18.0 (64.4)	18.7 (65.7)	21.1 (70.0)	24.2 (75.6)	27.0 (80.6)	28.9 (84.0)	30.5 (86.9)	31.2 (88.2)	30.4 (86.7)	28.4 (83.1)	24.5 (76.1)	20.0 (68.0)	25.2 (77.4)
Daily mean °C (°F)	13.2 (55.8)	13.7 (56.7)	15.7 (60.3)	18.5 (65.3)	21.5 (70.7)	24.0 (75.2)	26.0 (78.8)	26.7 (80.1)	25.5 (77.9)	23.2 (73.8)	19.1 (66.4)	15.1 (59.2)	20.2 (68.4)
Mean daily minimum °C (°F)	8.3 (46.9)	8.7 (47.7)	10.3 (50.5)	12.7 (54.9)	15.9 (60.6)	18.9 (66.0)	21.4 (70.5)	22.1 (71.8)	20.7 (69.3)	18.0 (64.4)	13.7 (56.7)	10.1 (50.2)	15.1 (59.2)
Record low °C (°F)	−0.6 (30.9)	1.3 (34.3)	2.7 (36.9)	3.1 (37.6)	10.0 (50.0)	13.0 (55.4)	16.5 (61.7)	17.5 (63.5)	11.7 (53.1)	10.6 (51.1)	4.9 (40.8)	2.5 (36.5)	−0.6 (30.9)
Average precipitation mm (inches)	145.3 (5.72)	90.7 (3.57)	51.5 (2.03)	13.1 (0.52)	3.1 (0.12)	0.1 (0.00)	0.0 (0.0)	0.0 (0.0)	1.4 (0.06)	21.7 (0.85)	79.7 (3.14)	127.4 (5.02)	534.0 (21.02)
Average precipitation days (≥ 1.0 mm)	9.8	7.7	5.0	1.5	0.4	0.0	0.0	0.0	0.3	2.2	5.3	8.0	40.2
Source: NOAA
