= List of synagogues in Israel =

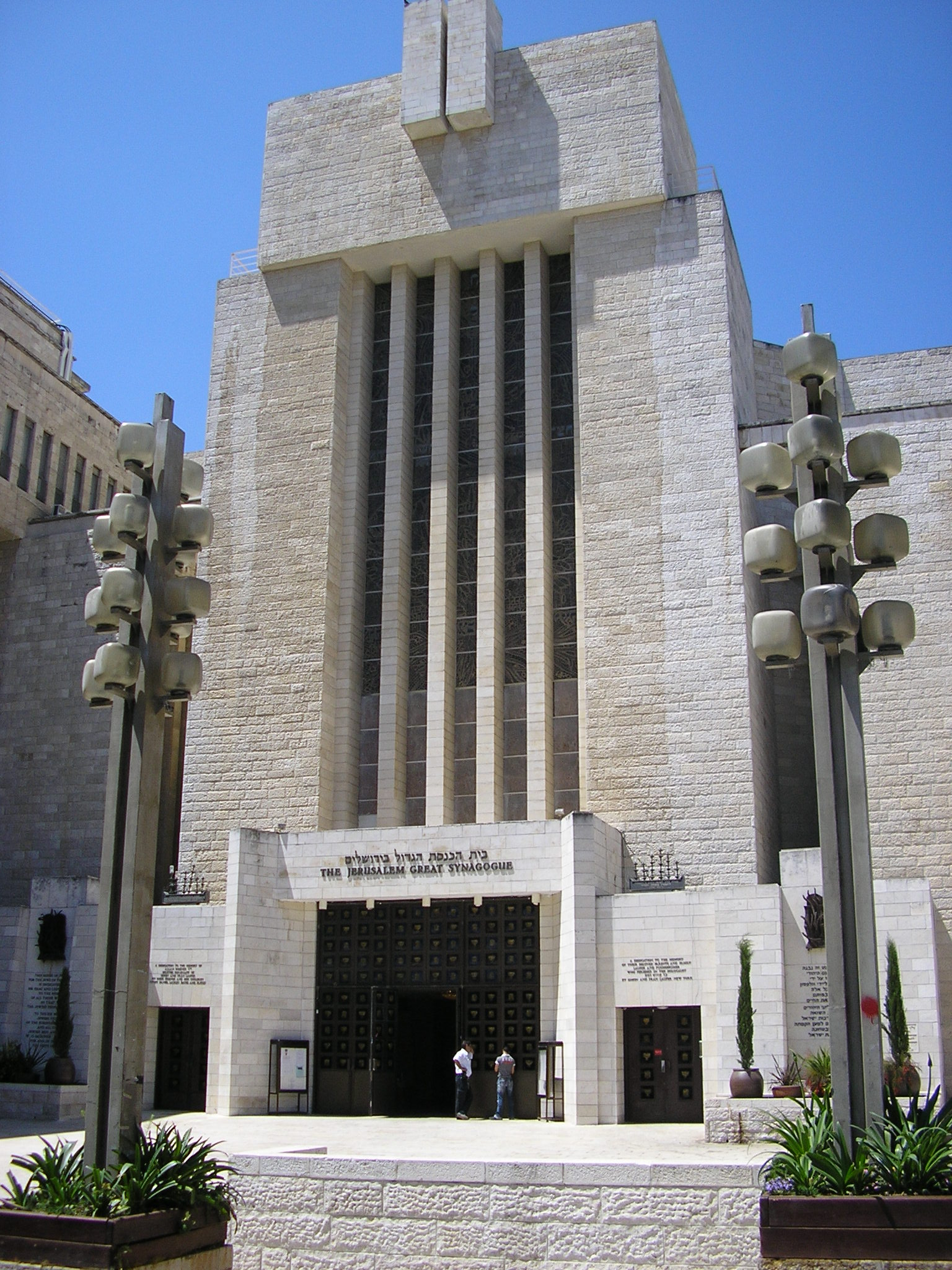
Jerusalem Great Synagogue

This is a list of notable synagogues in Israel. Only those that have Wikipedia entries are included here.

== Center District ==
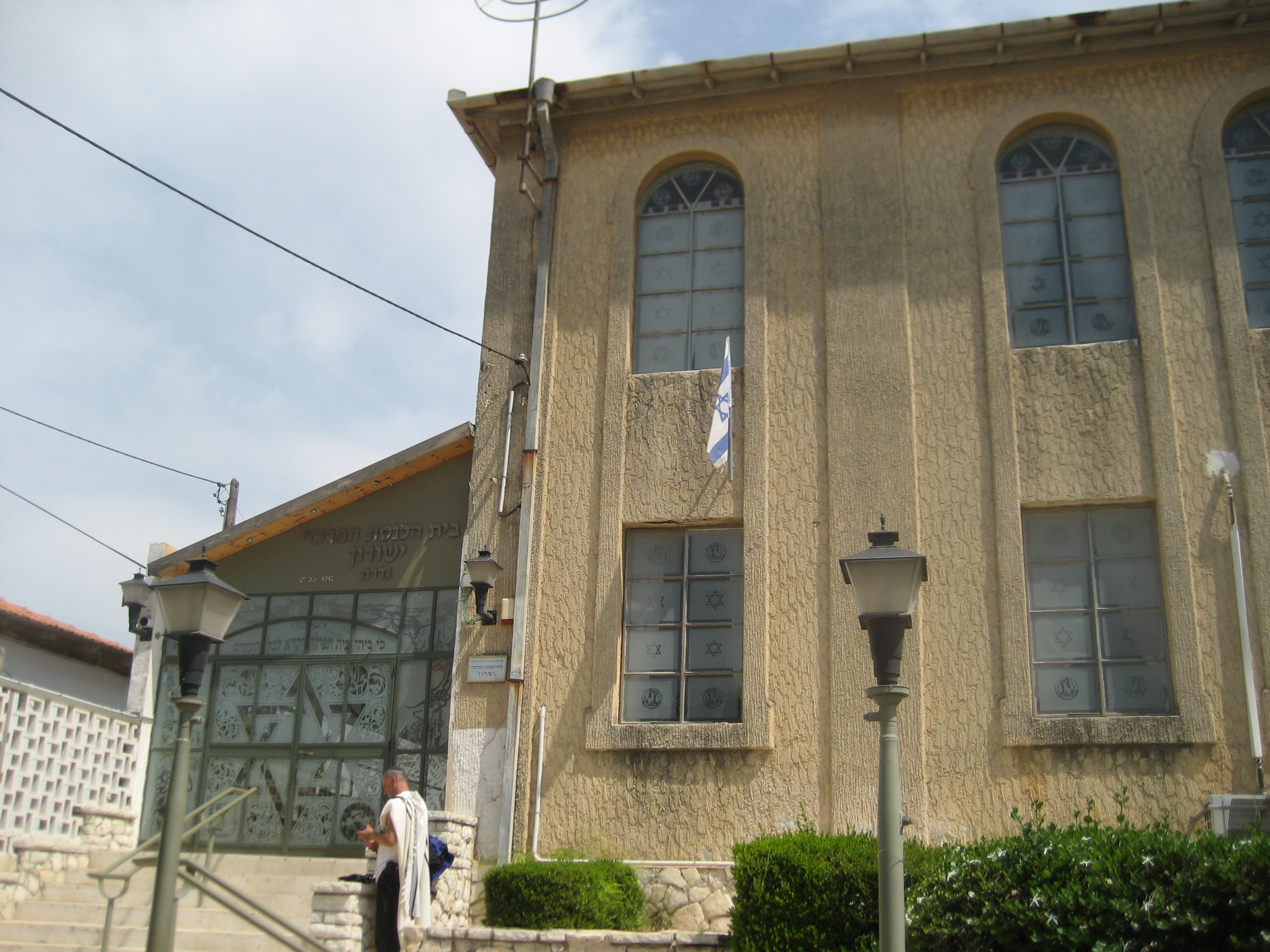
Yeshurun Central Synagogue, Gedera

- Great Synagogue (Petah Tikva)
- Yeshurun Central Synagogue (Gedera)

== Haifa District ==
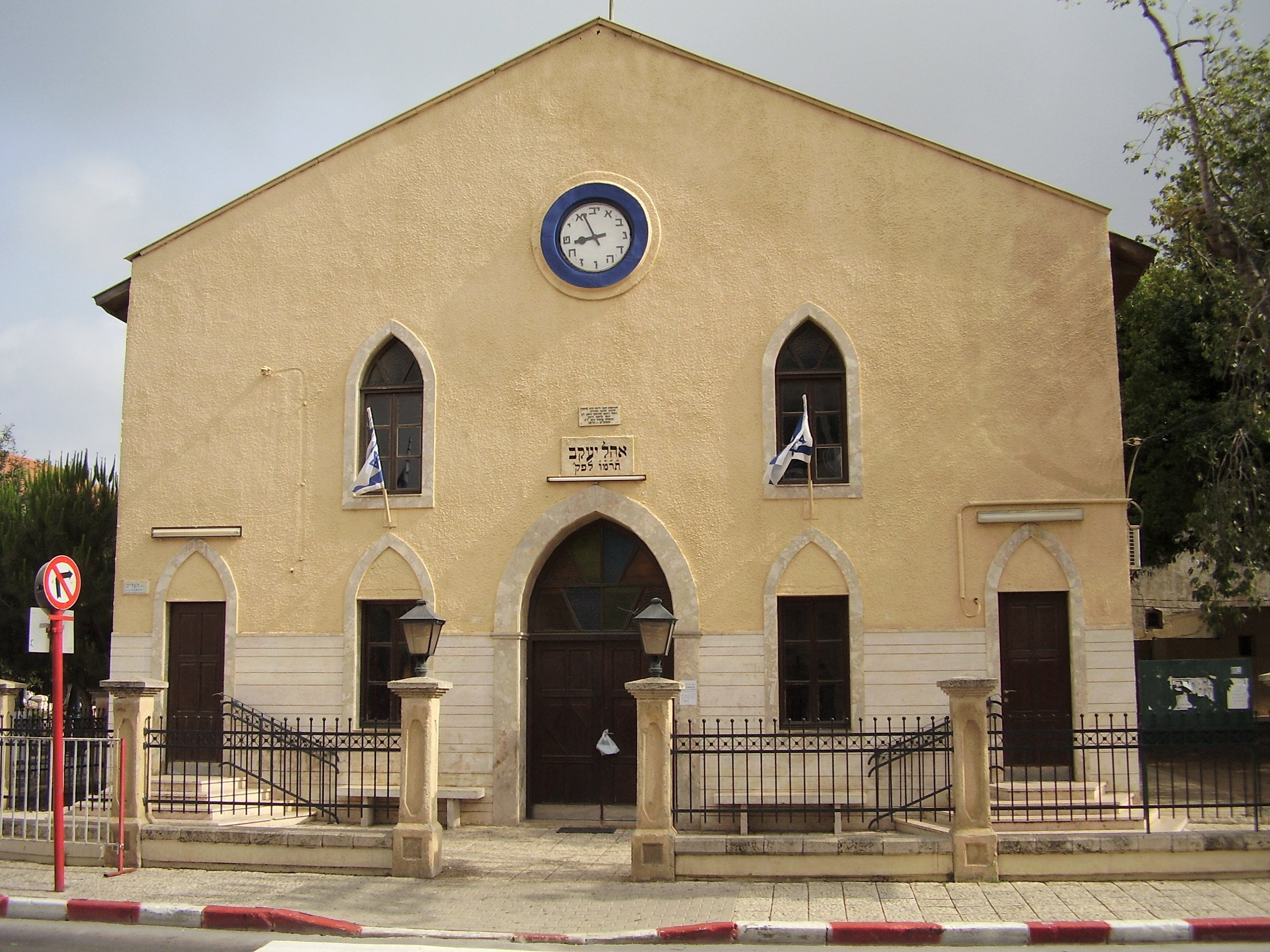
Ohel Ya'akov Synagogue, Zikhron Ya'akov

- Congregation Emet v'Shalom (Nahariya)
- Ohel Ya'akov Synagogue (Zikhron Ya'akov)

== Jerusalem District ==
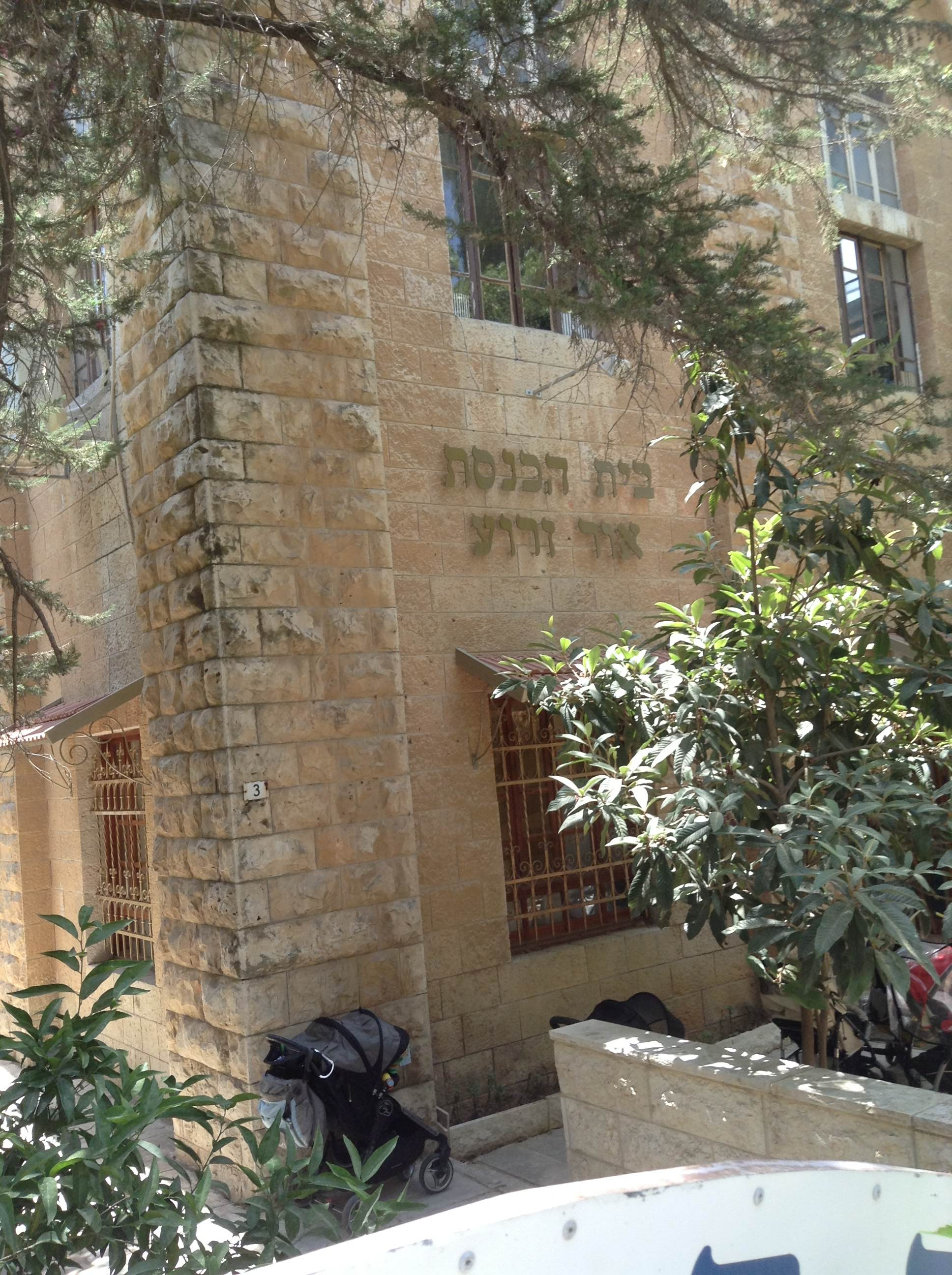
Exterior view of Or Zaruaa Synagogue on 3 Refaeli Street. It was founded by Rabbi Amram Aburbeh in the Nahlat Ahim neighbourhood of Jerusalem and has been declared a historic preservation heritage site.

== North District ==
- Abuhav synagogue (Safed)
- Ari Ashkenazi Synagogue (Safed)
- Old synagogues of Tiberias (Tiberias)
- Or Torah Synagogue (Acre)
- Peki'in Synagogue (Peki'in)
- Ramchal Synagogue (Acre)
- Shfaram Ancient Synagogue (Shfaram)

== Tel Aviv District ==
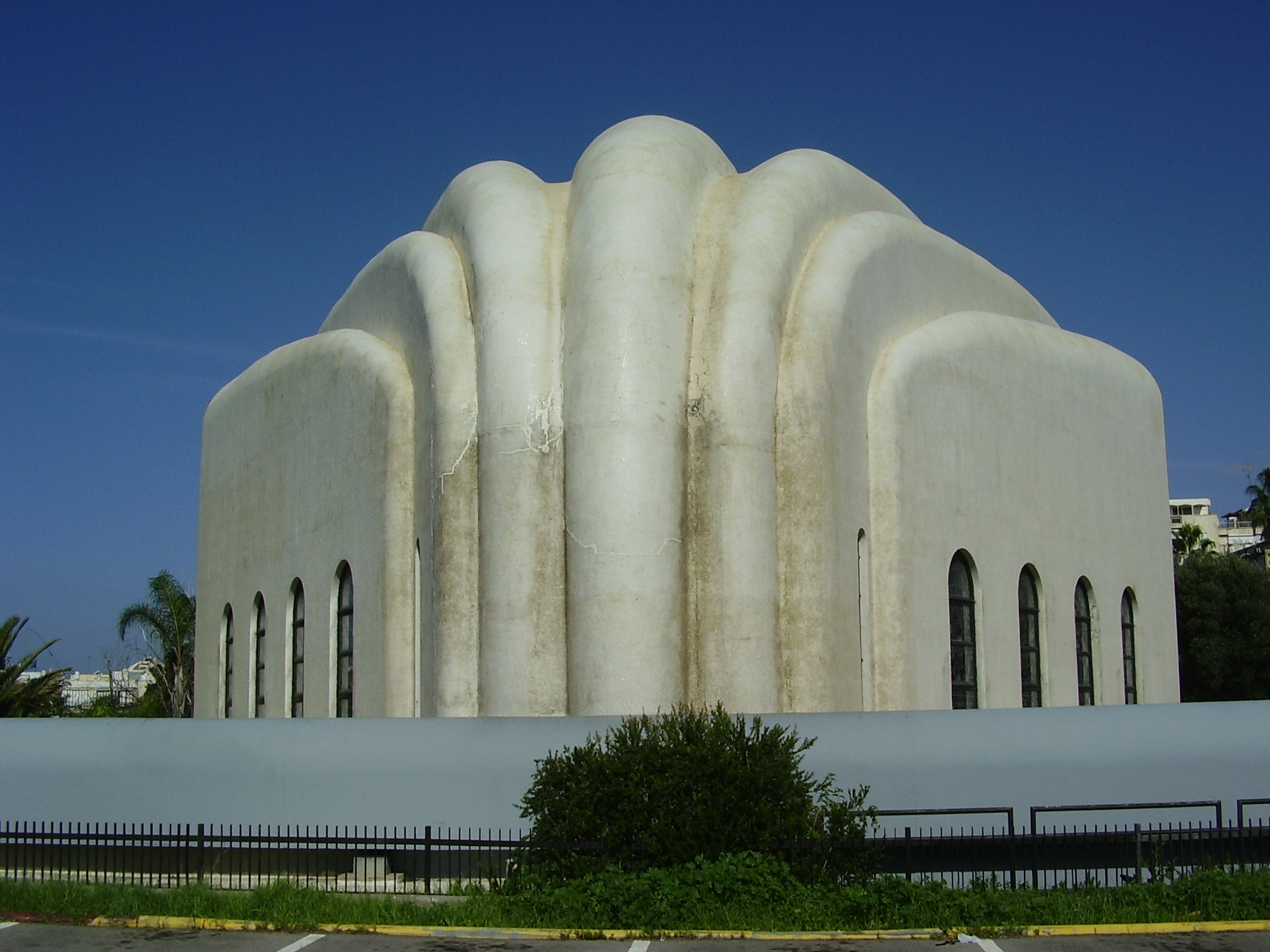
Hechal Yehuda Synagogue, Tel Aviv

- Brit Olam Ono, (Kiryat Ono, on Ono Academic College campus)
- Cymbalista Synagogue and Jewish Heritage Center, (Tel Aviv)
- Great Synagogue (Tel Aviv)
- Hechal Yehuda Synagogue (Tel Aviv)

== See also ==
- Ancient synagogues in Palestine covers modern Israel, West Bank, Gaza, Golan Heights, and Transjordan
  - Ancient synagogues in Israel
