= Hechal Yehuda Synagogue =

Orthodox synagogue in Tel Aviv, Israel

- Hebrew: בית הכנסת היכל יהודה
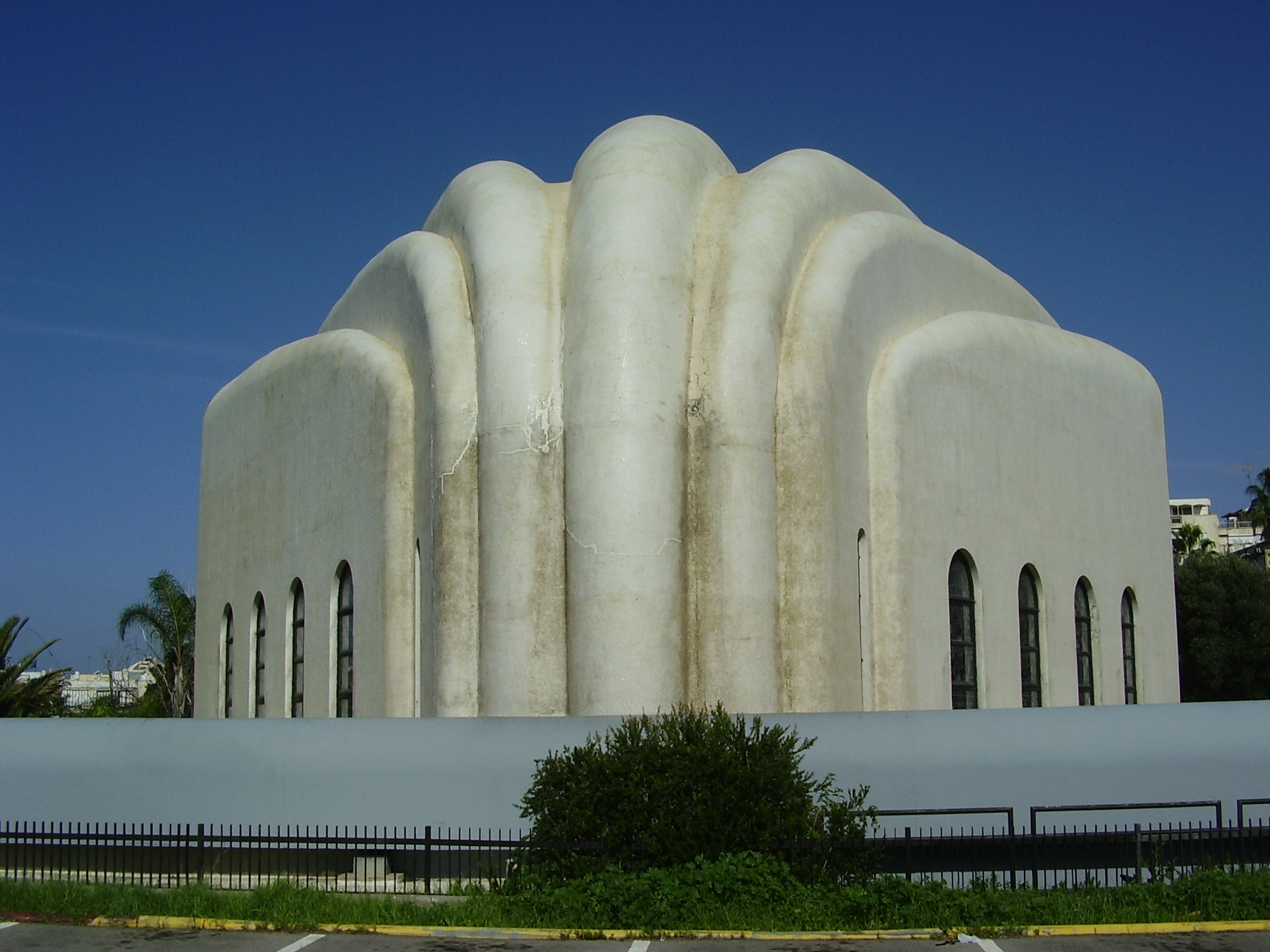
- The synagogue in 2010

- Location of the synagogue in Tel Aviv

Religion
- Affiliation: Orthodox Judaism
- Rite: Nusach Sefard
- Ecclesiastical or organizational status: Synagogue
- Status: Active

Location
- Location: Menahem ben Saruq street, Tel Aviv
- Country: Israel
- Interactive map of Hechal Yehuda Synagogue
- Coordinates: 32°5′12.22″N 34°47′0.17″E

Architecture
- Architects: Yitzchak Toledano; Aharon Russo
- Type: Synagogue architecture
- Style: Modernist; Expressionist
- Funded by: Family of Yehuda Leon Recanati
- Completed: 1980

Specifications
- Direction of façade: North
- Capacity: 600 worshipers
- Materials: Concrete

The Hechal Yehuda Synagogue (Hebrew: בית הכנסת היכל יהודה, romanized: Beit haKnesset Hechal Yehuda), also commonly known as the Recanati synagogue (Hebrew: בית הכנסת רקנטי, romanized: Beit haKnesset Recanati), often referred to as the Seashell Synagogue (Hebrew: בית הכנסת קונכית, romanized: Beit haKnesset Konkit, Greek: Συναγωγή Κοχύλι) because of its unusual shape resembling a seashell, is an Orthodox Jewish congregation and synagogue, located on Menahem ben Saruq street, in the city centre of Tel Aviv, Israel.

== History ==
Hechal Yehuda is one of approximately 500 synagogues in Tel Aviv. It was built in memory of the Jewish community of Thessaloniki, which was almost completely destroyed during the Holocaust. It is named in honour of Yehuda Leon Recanati. The design is inspired by the seashells on the shores of the Greek city of Thessaloniki, which is the hometown of the wealthy Recanati family and the synagogue's architect, Yitzhak Toledano. The Recanati family donated the money for the synagogue.

The construction of the synagogue was completed in 1980, after both Toledano and Recanati had died. Today most worshippers at the synagogue are Greek-Sephardi Jews originating from Thessaloniki.

== Architecture ==
The north bare concrete facade is decorated with bas-reliefs of traditional Jewish motifs and symbols, made by artist Yechezkel Kimchi, while the coloured-glass windows, that present motifs from Jewish holidays, were made by the local artist Josef Shealtiel. The shell-like design creates an internal space which enables the congregation to see and to hear from wherever they are seated. The synagogue, incorporating two floors, has room for 600 persons, 400 men and 200 women in separated galleries.

== Gallery ==
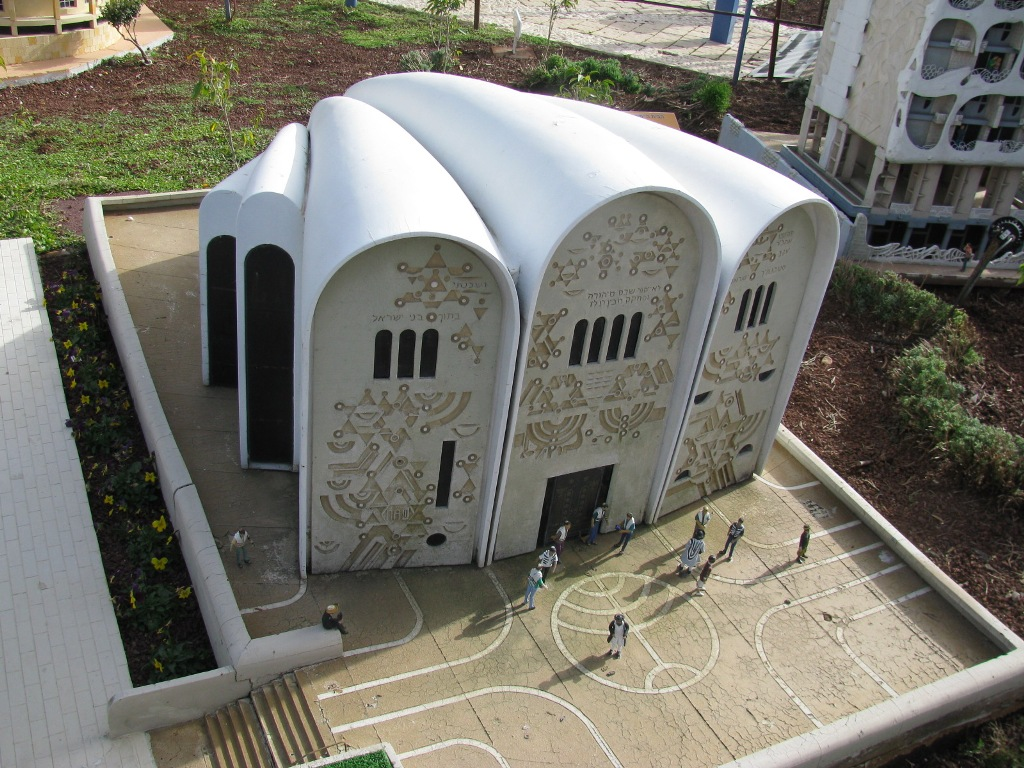
Model of the synagogue at Mini Israel

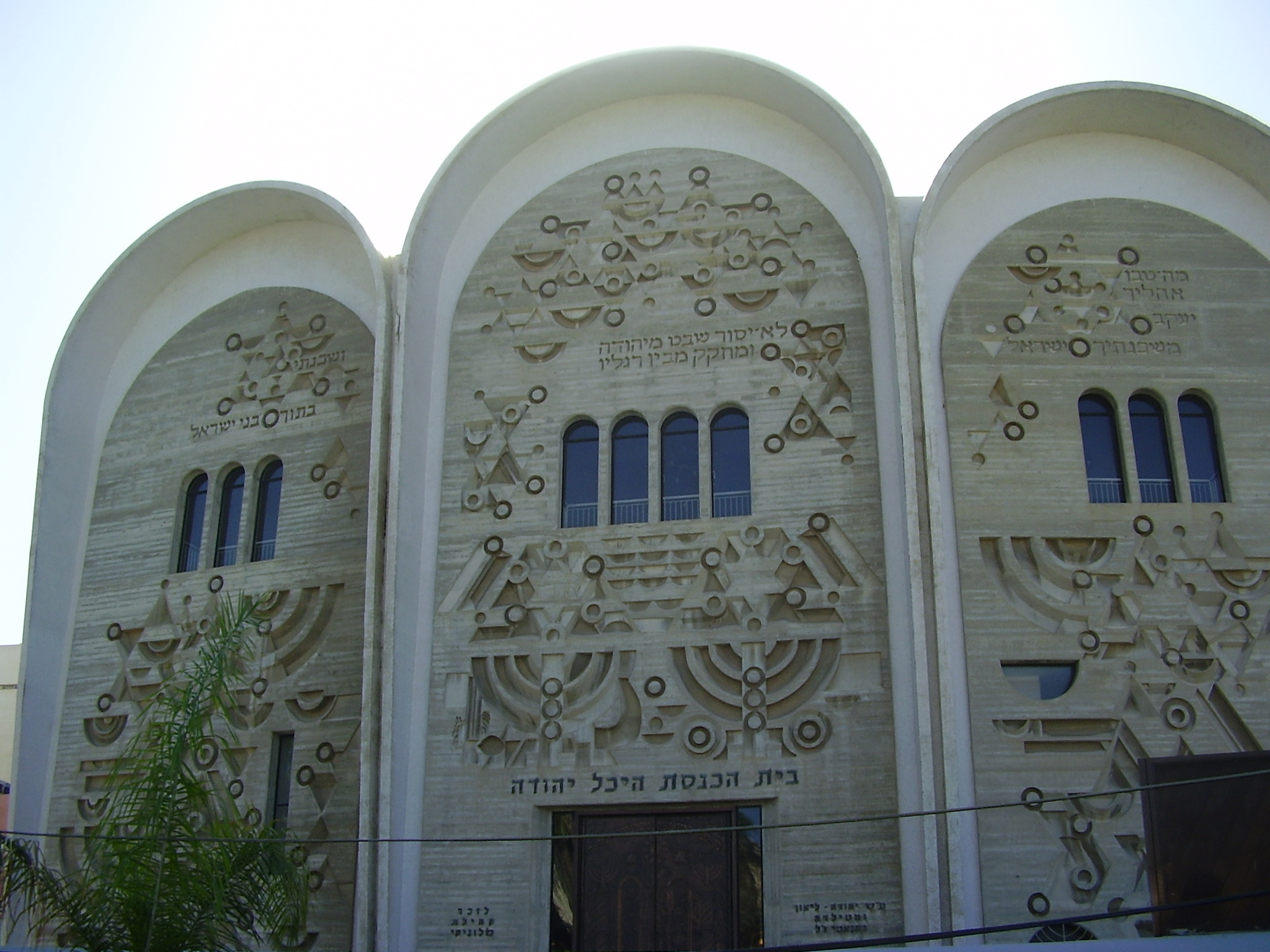
Entrance facade

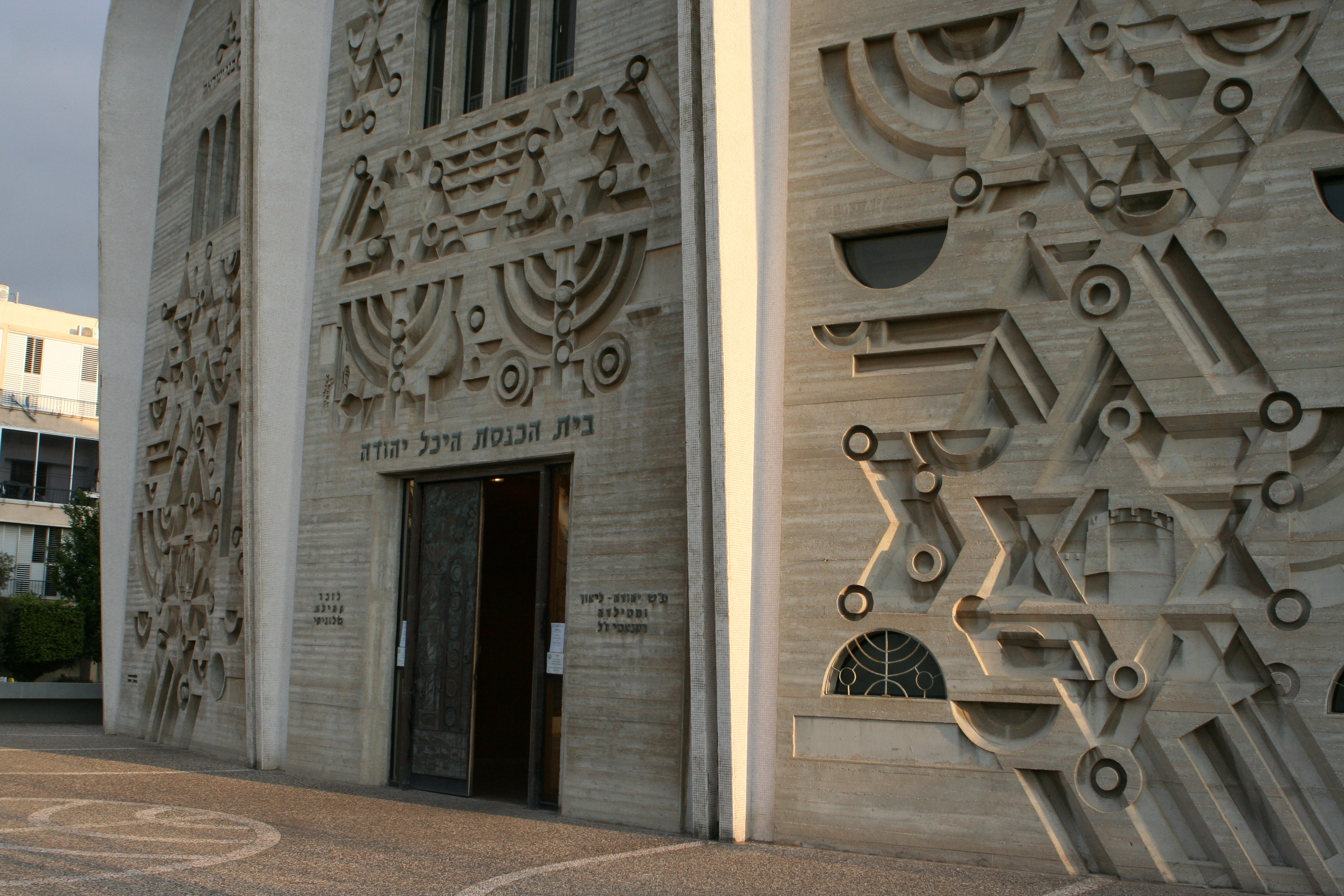
Detail of the façade, in 2009

== See also ==
- Architecture in Israel
- History of the Jews in Israel
- List of synagogues in Israel
