= Ancient Synagogue of Shfaram =

Ancient former synagogue in Israel

- Hebrew: בית הכנסת בשפרעם; Arabic: شفا عمرو كنيس
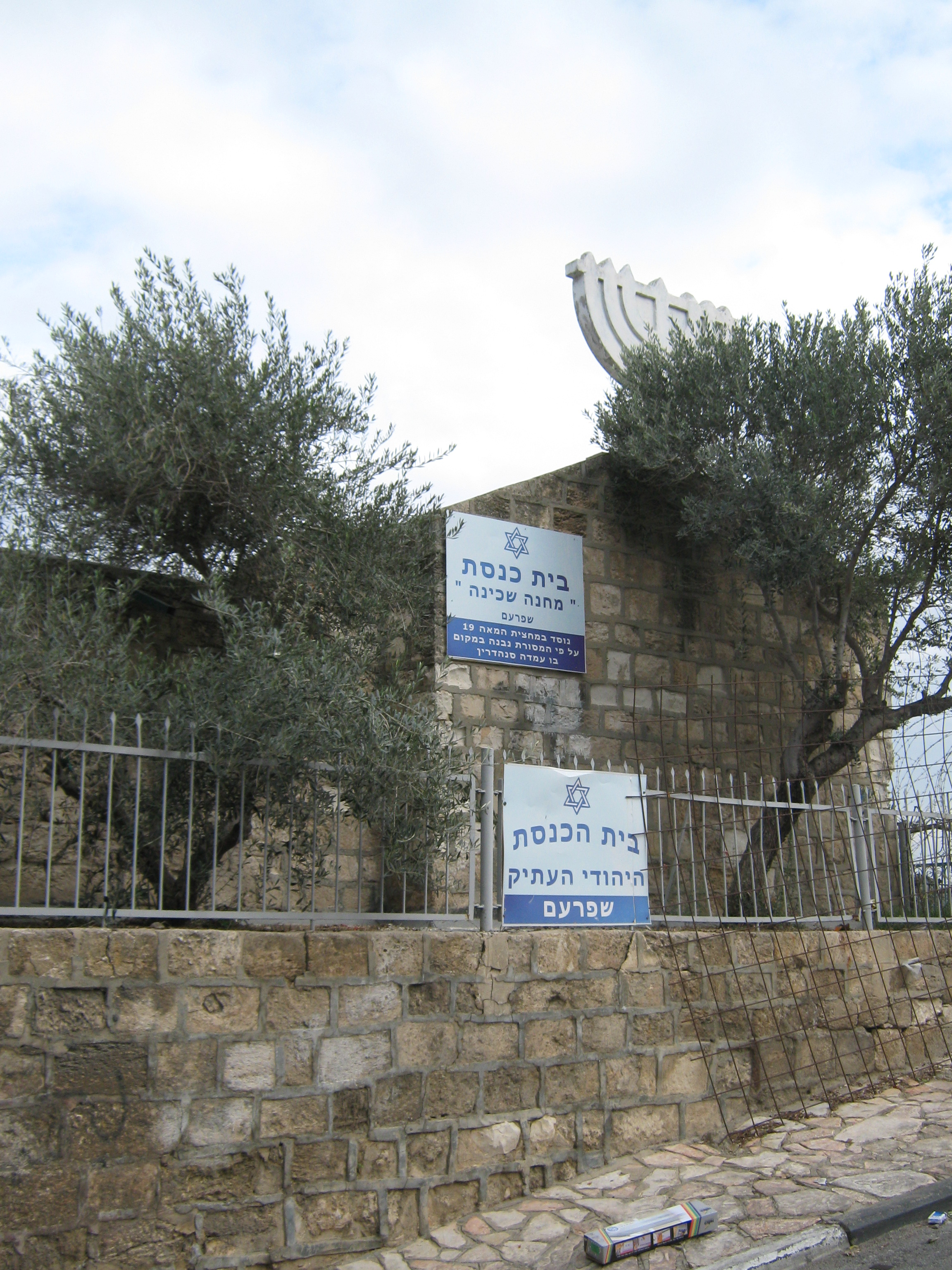
- The former synagogue, in 2010

- Location of the former synagogue in the Haifa District

Religion
- Affiliation: Judaism (former)
- Ecclesiastical or organisational status: Synagogue (17th century–1970s)
- Status: Inactive

Location
- Location: Shfaram, Haifa District, Northern Israel
- Coordinates: 32°48′22″N 35°10′14″E

Architecture
- Type: Synagogue architecture
- Completed: 17th century

The Ancient Synagogue of Shfaram (Hebrew: בית הכנסת בשפרעם; Arabic: شفا عمرو كنيس) is a former ancient synagogue, located in the Israeli-Arab city of Shfaram, (Note: Variously known as Shefa-Amr, Shefa-‘Amr, Shafa-Amar, or Shfar'am.) in Northern Israel.

== History ==
The synagogue was built in the 17th century, atop the ruins of an ancient synagogue that had been built on a site where, according to tradition, the Sanhedrin had once sat. The synagogue fell into ruin, but during the mid-18th century, Bedouin chieftain Zahir al-Umar gave permission to the Jews to return and renovate the synagogue there.

Shfaram was noted in 1845 by Rabbi Joseph Schwarz in his book Descriptive Geography and Brief Historical Sketch of Palestine as having "about thirty Jewish families who have an old synagogue". Jews lived in Shfaram until the 1970s when the community disbanded. Subsequently, the building fell into disrepair and was only recently renovated. Although being abandoned, the keys to the former house of worship are held by a local Muslim and the synagogue is treated with respect by the local Arabs. (Note: In Shfaram most of the 25,000 residents are Arab, and the town was signaled out by the Simon Wiesenthal Center as a living example of religious tolerance: Shfaram’s historic synagogue, long empty and without Torah scrolls and prayer books, is still treated by its Christian, Muslim, and Druze neighbors as a sacred communal trust. To this day, the keys to the former house of worship are held, by a local Muslim housewife.)

In November 2006 the building was rededicated after works to renovate the synagogue were carried out voluntarily by a group of newly qualified police officers. At the ceremony, Shfaram mayor Ursan Yassin retold how that during the October riots he had been forced to physically protect the location and had told local youngsters who wanted to burn it down that they could set him alight, but he would not allow them to harm the synagogue. There were however reports of damage to religious artifacts in the ancient synagogue on October 9, 2000; and desecration of the synagogue's exterior in 2013.

In May 2014, members of Shfaram's school youth leadership group and thecoalition Shutafut-Sharakah (Jewish-Arab) cleaned and repaired the synagogue, in response to a series of price tag attacks by Jewish extremists in the region. The organisers called on the government to take a firmer stand against such attacks. Jewish visitors collect the key from the Jafari family.

== See also ==
- History of the Jews in Israel
- List of synagogues in Israel
