= Emet veShalom =

Reform synagogue in Nahariya, Israel

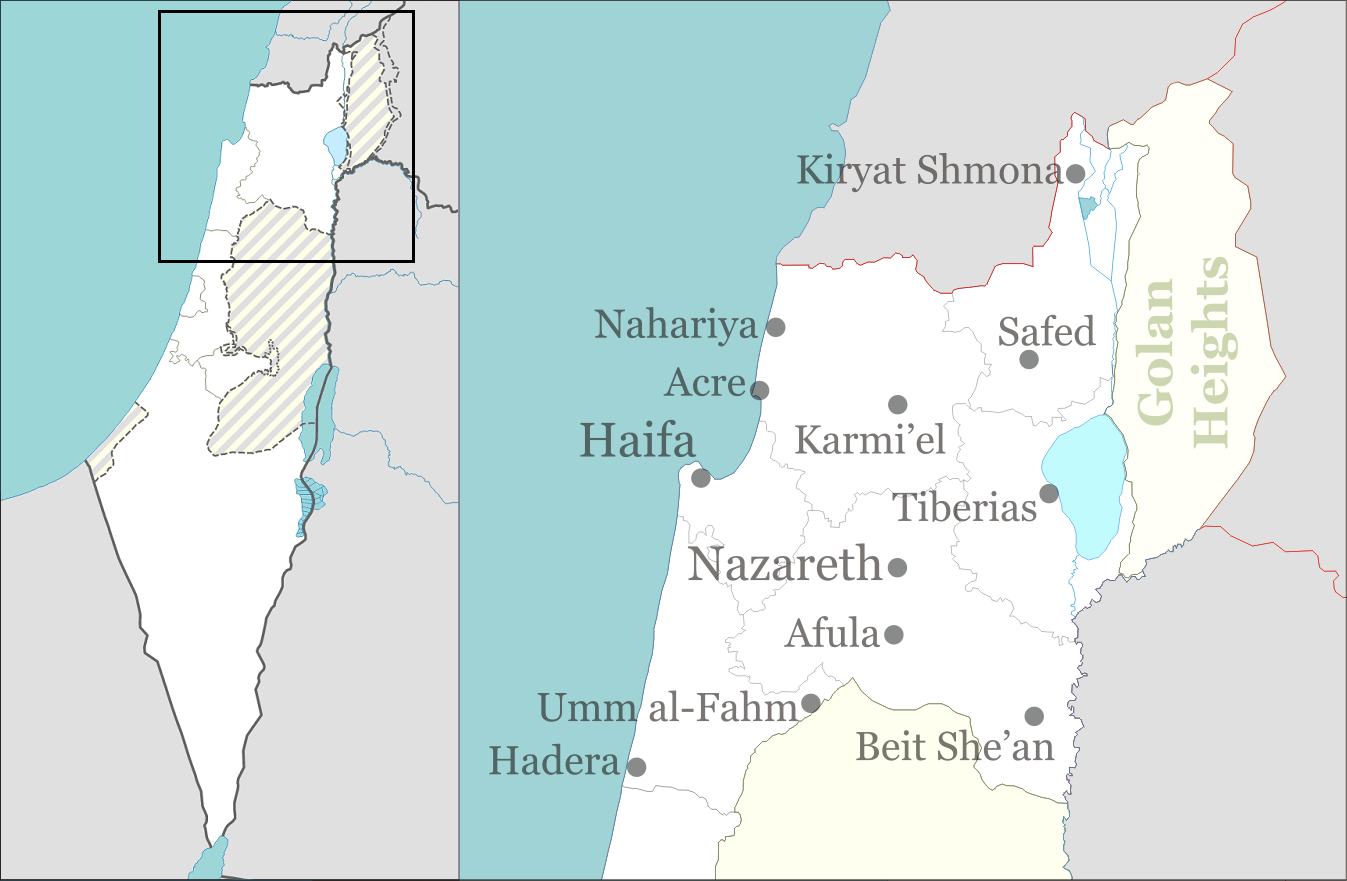
- Location of the synagogue, north of Haifa

Religion
- Affiliation: Reform Judaism
- Ecclesiastical or organisational status: Synagogue
- Leadership: Rabbi Ariella Graetz-Bartuv
- Status: Active

Location
- Location: 1 Keren Hayesod Street, Nahariya, Haifa District, Western Galilee
- Country: Israel
- Coordinates: 33°00′17″N 35°05′49″E

Architecture
- Type: Synagogue architecture
- Established: 1963 (as a congregation)

Website
- emetveshalom.com (in Hebrew)

The Emet veShalom, also known as the Emet V'Shalom, is a Reform Jewish congregation and synagogue, located at 1 Keren Hayesod Street, in Nahariya, in the Haifa District, in the western Galilee region of Israel.

== Overview ==
Since 1963, the Jewish congregation has been open. The congregation is affiliated with the Israel Movement for Reform and Progressive Judaism.

The part-time rabbi, since c. 2015, is Rabbi Ariella Graetz-Bartuv.

=== Twinning ===
Emet VeShalom has twin relationships with a number of other congregations, including:

- Temple Emanu-El in Tucson, Arizona, United States
- Wimbledon Synagogue in London, England, United Kingdom

The Congregation also has a long-standing relationship with Temple Sinai of Milwaukee, Wisconsin as well as a relationship with Temple Beth El, Madison, Wisconsin.

== See also ==
- History of the Jews in Israel
- List of synagogues in Israel
