= Yeshurun Central Synagogue =

Orthodox synagogue in Gedera, Israel

- Hebrew: בית הכנסת המרכזי ישורון
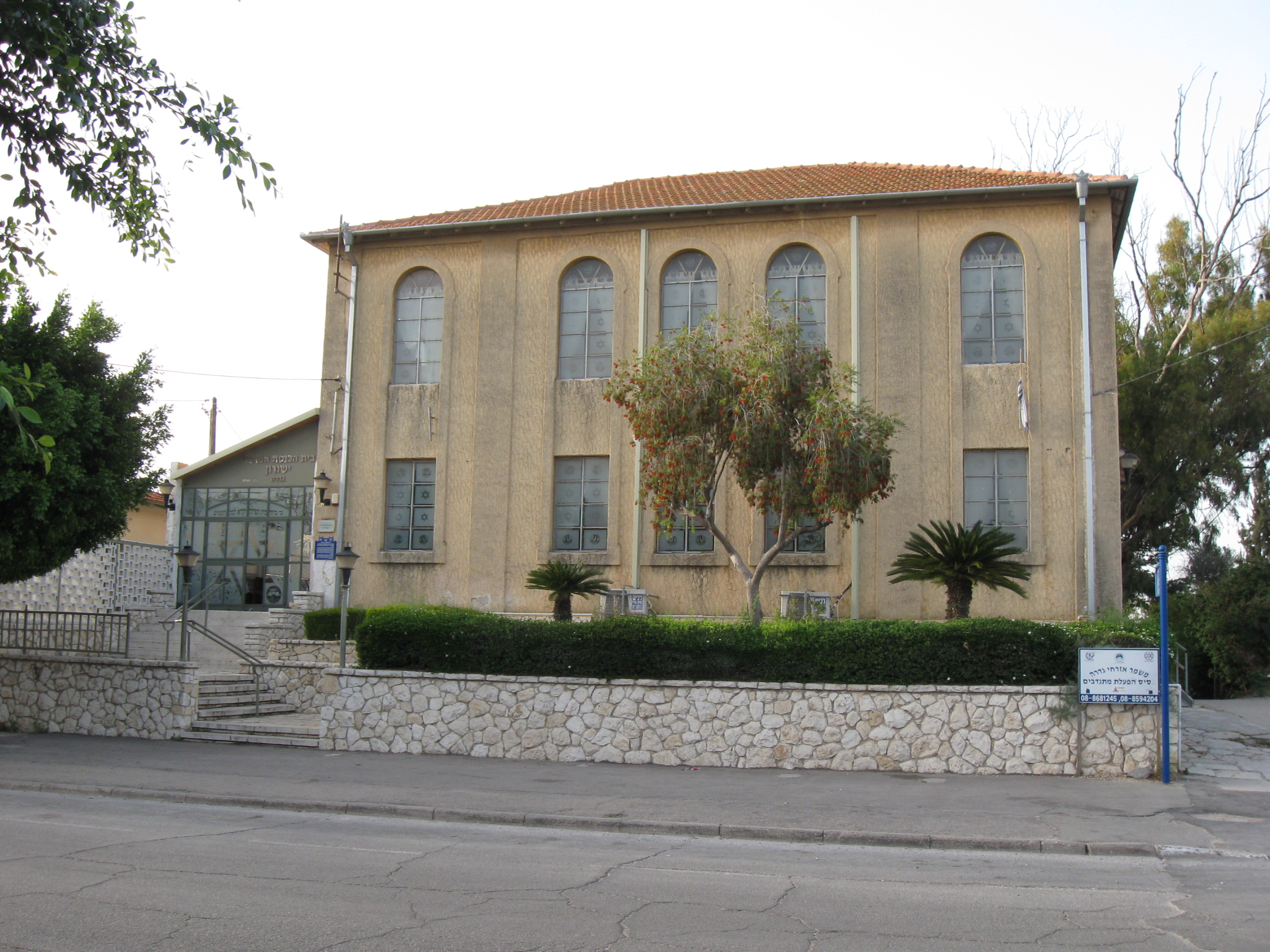
- The synagogue, in 2010

- Location of the synagogue in Israel

Religion
- Affiliation: Orthodox Judaism
- Ecclesiastical or organizational status: Synagogue
- Status: Active

Location
- Location: Biluim Street, Gedera
- Country: Israel
- Interactive map of Yeshurun Central Synagogue
- Coordinates: 31°49′4″N 34°46′36″E

Architecture
- Type: Synagogue architecture
- Completed: 1912

The Yeshurun Central Synagogue (Hebrew: בית הכנסת המרכזי ישורון) is an Orthodox Jewish congregation and synagogue, located on Biluim Street, in Gedera, Israel. It was the first synagogue to be built in the town, completed during the time of the Biluim, forerunners of the kibbutz movement 1882 from the Russian Empire. Before the synagogue was built, the first settlers used a shack as a synagogue. The current synagogue was built in 1912 on the same exact location of the former shack.

== Etymology ==
Yeshurun or Jeshurun is a poetic name for Israel (Deut. 32:15;), the Land of Israel (Deut. 33:5;), or the Patriarch Jacob (Genesis 32:29)

== See also ==
- History of the Jews in Israel
- List of synagogues in Israel
