= Ohel Ya'akov Synagogue (Zikhron Ya'akov) =

Main synagogue of Zikhron Ya'akov, Israel

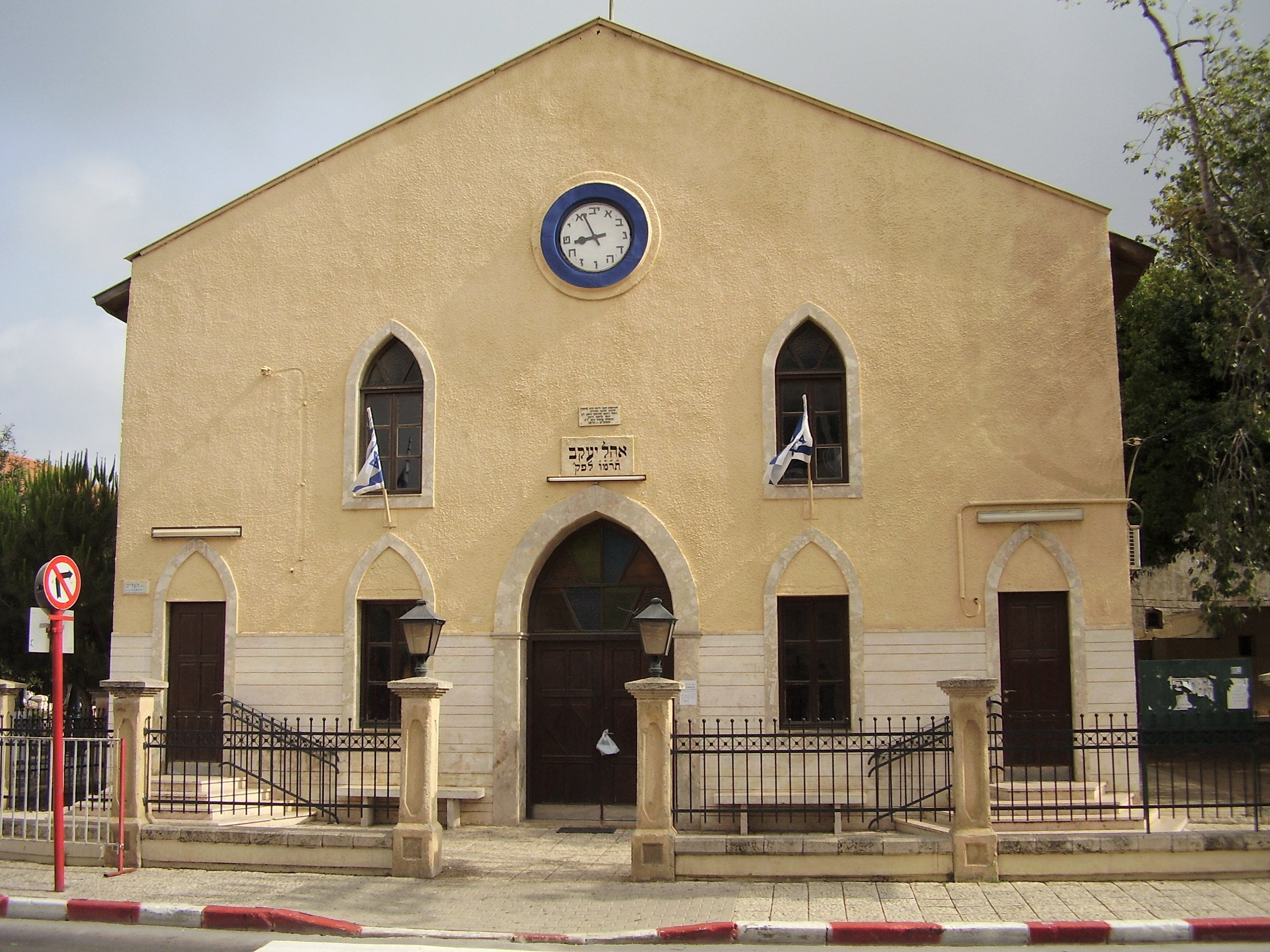
- The synagogue façade, in 2006

- The location of the synagogue in the Haifa District of Israel

Religion
- Affiliation: Orthodox Judaism
- Ecclesiastical or organizational status: Synagogue
- Status: Active

Location
- Location: Zikhron Ya'akov, Haifa District
- Country: Israel
- Interactive map of Ohel Ya'akov Synagogue
- Coordinates: 32°34′27″N 34°57′15″E

Architecture
- Type: Synagogue architecture
- Style: Gothic Revival
- Founder: Baron Edmond James de Rothschild
- Established: 1884 (as a congregation)
- Completed: 1886

The Ohel Ya'akov Synagogue is an Ashkenazic Orthodox Jewish congregation and synagogue, located in Zikhron Ya'akov, a town in the Haifa District of Israel. The congregation was founded by Baron Edmond James de Rothschild in 1884.

== Overview ==
Rothschild commissioned the construction the synagogue in memory of his father Jacob Mayer de Rothschild. It was completed in 1886. Its name, Ohel Yaakov, means "Tent of Jacob" and alludes to the biblical Jacob, who "dwelled in tents" according to Genesis 25:27. The synagogue, which has a large main section for men and a second-floor, wraparound women's section, has a Holy ark made of white marble and marble interior walls.

== See also ==
- History of the Jews in Israel
- List of synagogues in Israel
