= Gedera =

Gedera: גְּדֵרָה
- Local council

Hebrew transcription(s)
  - ISO 259: Gdera
  - Also spelled: Gdera, Gederah (unofficial)
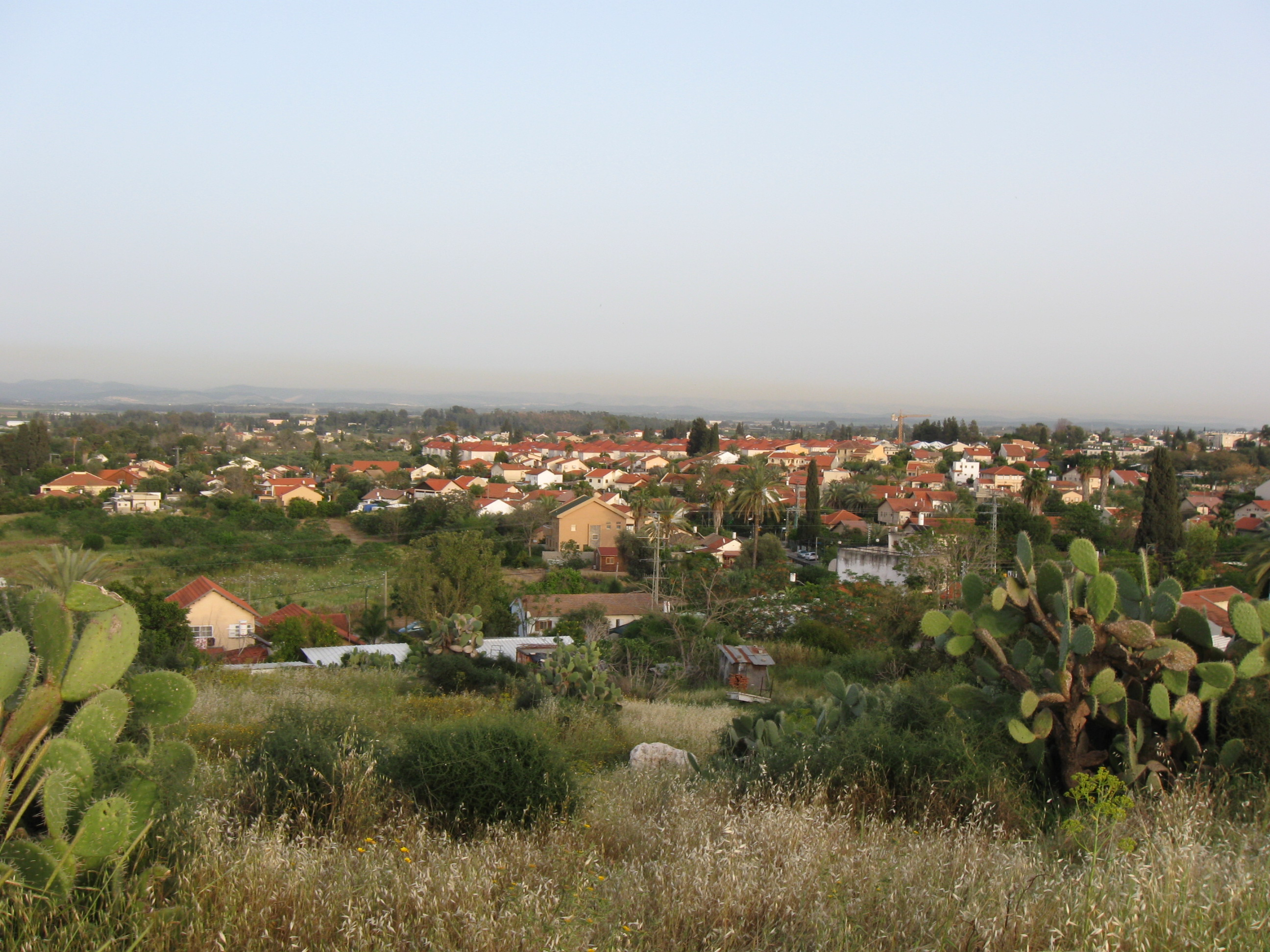
- View of Gedera from Tel Qatra

- Location within Central Israel Location within Israel
- Coordinates: 31°48′43″N 34°46′38″E
- Country: Israel
- District: Central
- Subdistrict: Rehovot
- Natural Region: Rehovot
- Founded: 1884; 142 years ago

Government
  - Head of Municipality: Sahar Pinto

Area
  - Total: 14.5 km^{2} (5.6 sq mi)
- Name meaning: Sheepfold

Gedera, less commonly known as Gdera (Hebrew: גְּדֵרָה), is a town in the southern part of the Shfela region in the Central District of Israel founded in 1884. It is 13 kilometres (8 miles) south of Rehovot. In 2024 it had a population of 31,389.

== History ==
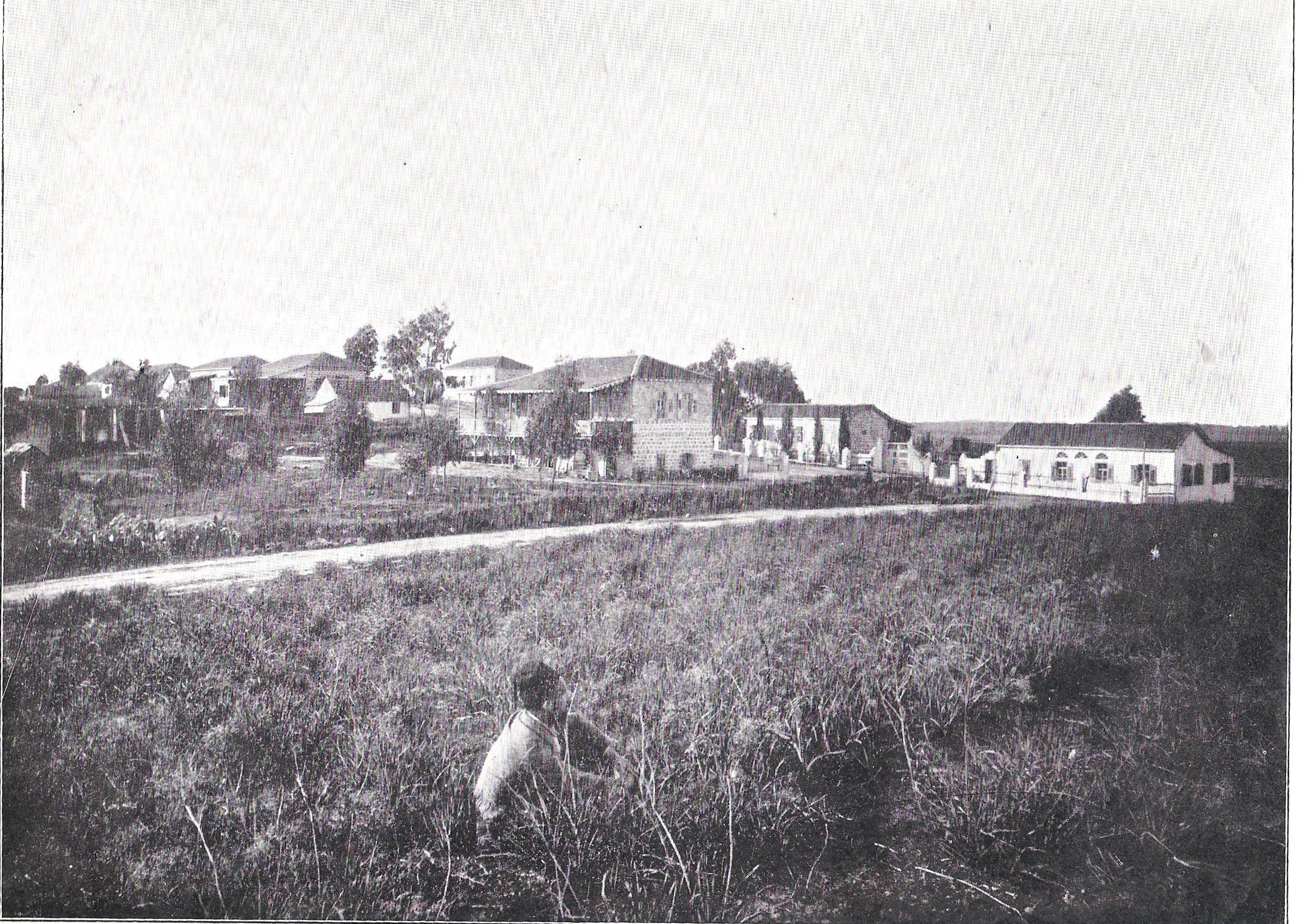
Gedera, circa 1899

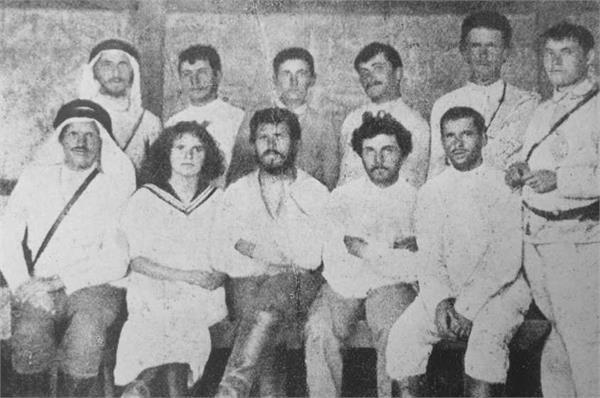
Gedera residents 1913

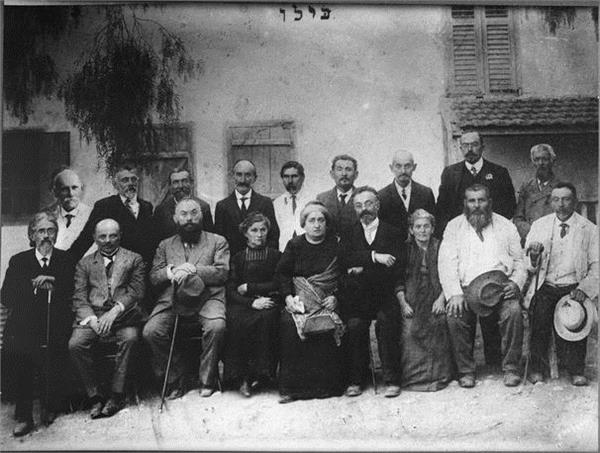
Gedera residents 1931

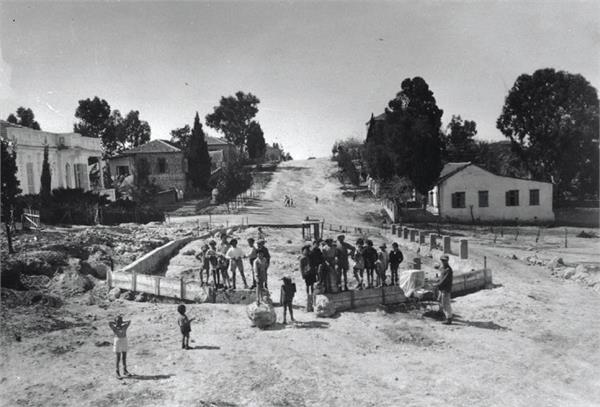
Gedera 1935

Tel Qatra was occupied from the Middle Bronze Age to at least the early Islamic period. Sometime between then and the Medieval period, the settlement moved to the southern foot of the tell, where the Palestinian village of Qatra existed until 1948. Its peak was in the Byzantine period when the tell had at least one large public building.

Gedera is in the Book of Chronicles I 4:23 and the Book of Joshua 15:36 as a town in the territory of Judah. Its identification with the site of modern Gedera was proposed by Victor Guérin in the 19th century, but was dismissed as "impossible" by William F. Albright who preferred to identify it with al-Judeira. Biblical Gedera is now identified with Khirbet Judraya, 1 km (0.6 mi) south of Bayt Nattif.

Tel Qatra, which lies at the northern edge of Gedera, is usually identified with Kedron, a place fortified by the Seleucids against the Hasmonaeans (1 Macc. 15:39–41, 16:9). It has also been identified with Gedrus, a large village in the time of Eusebius (fourth century). Eusebius identified Gedrus with biblical Gedor, which is a name also appearing on the Madaba map, but several other sites for Gedor have been proposed.

=== Newer History ===
Gedera was founded in the winter of 1884 by Jewish settlers from the Russian Empire who were members of the Bilu group, to the south of Qatra. Gedera was established on a tract of village land purchased for the Biluites by Yechiel Michel Pines of the Lovers of Zion from the French consul in Jaffa, Poliovierre. The first pioneers arrived at the site during the festival of Chanukah. In 1888, Benjamin and Mina Fuchs built Gedera's first stone house, later used as a Bnai Brith meeting house.

The Zionist secular immigrants of Gederah were young and considered aggressive towards the pre-existing Palestinian Arab population. Zionist sources indicate they provoked Palestinians in the adjacent village of Qatra, humiliating them and being unfair and arrogant towards them. In one case, following a quarrel with Qatra in 1887 (in the course of which a Jew was wounded while trying to prevent Arab herdsmen from grazing their flocks on the village's land), the immigrants deliberately started a fight to attract the attention of prominent Jewish activists in Jaffa.

In 1912, a group of Yemenite immigrants settled in Gedera. During the British Mandate, Gedera became a popular resort due to its mild climate and fresh air.

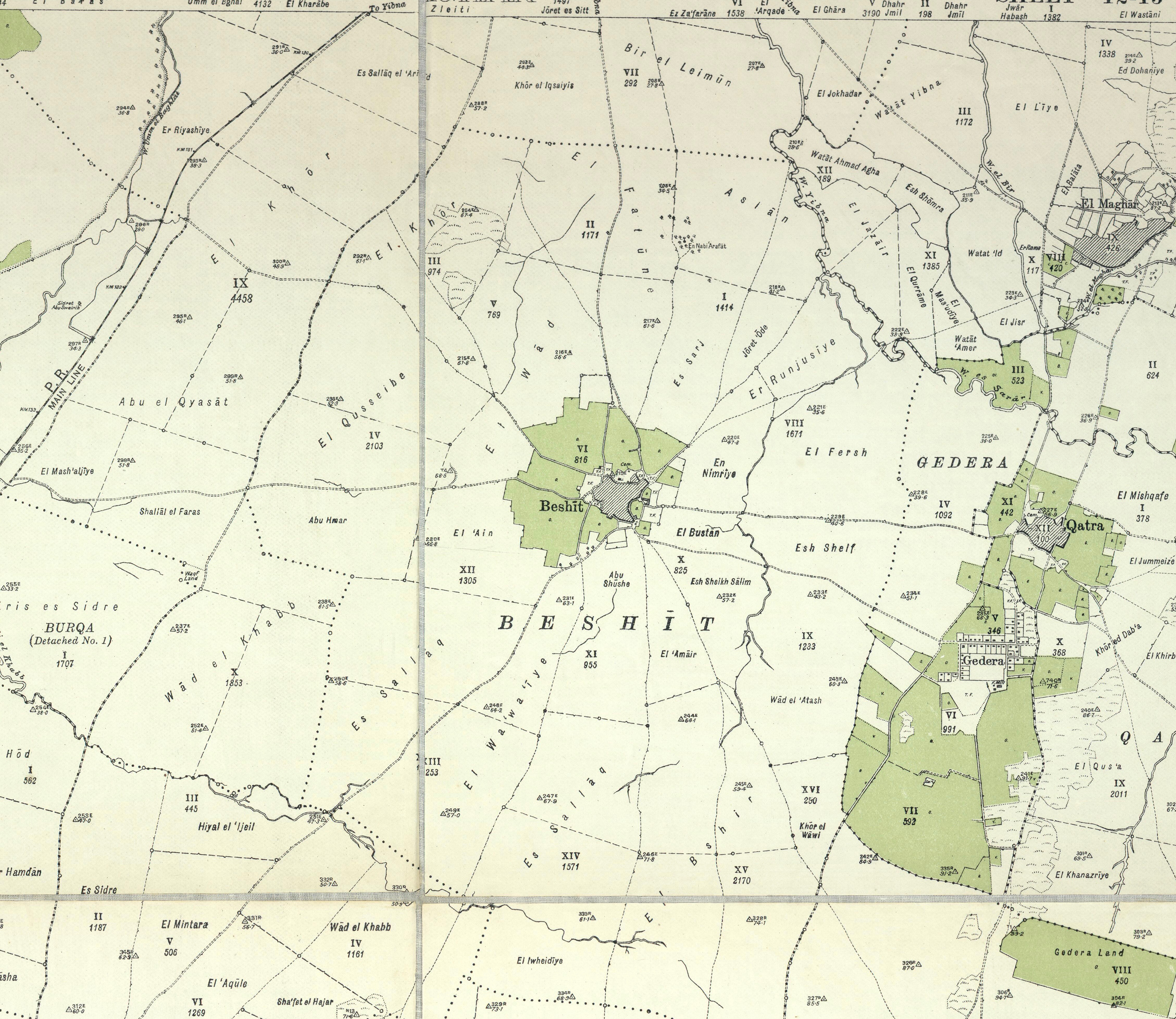
Gedera 1930 1:20,000

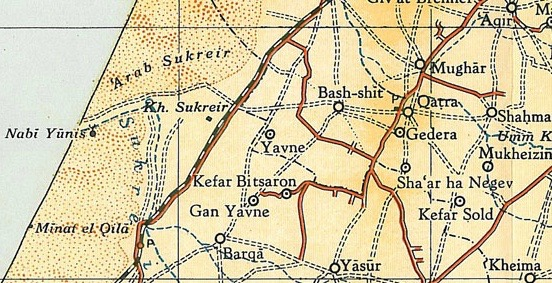
Gedera 1945 1:250,000

In 1949–1953, thousands of immigrants from Yemen, Romania, Iraq, Poland, Egypt, Morocco, Tunis, India, Iran, Libya, and other countries were housed in tent camps.

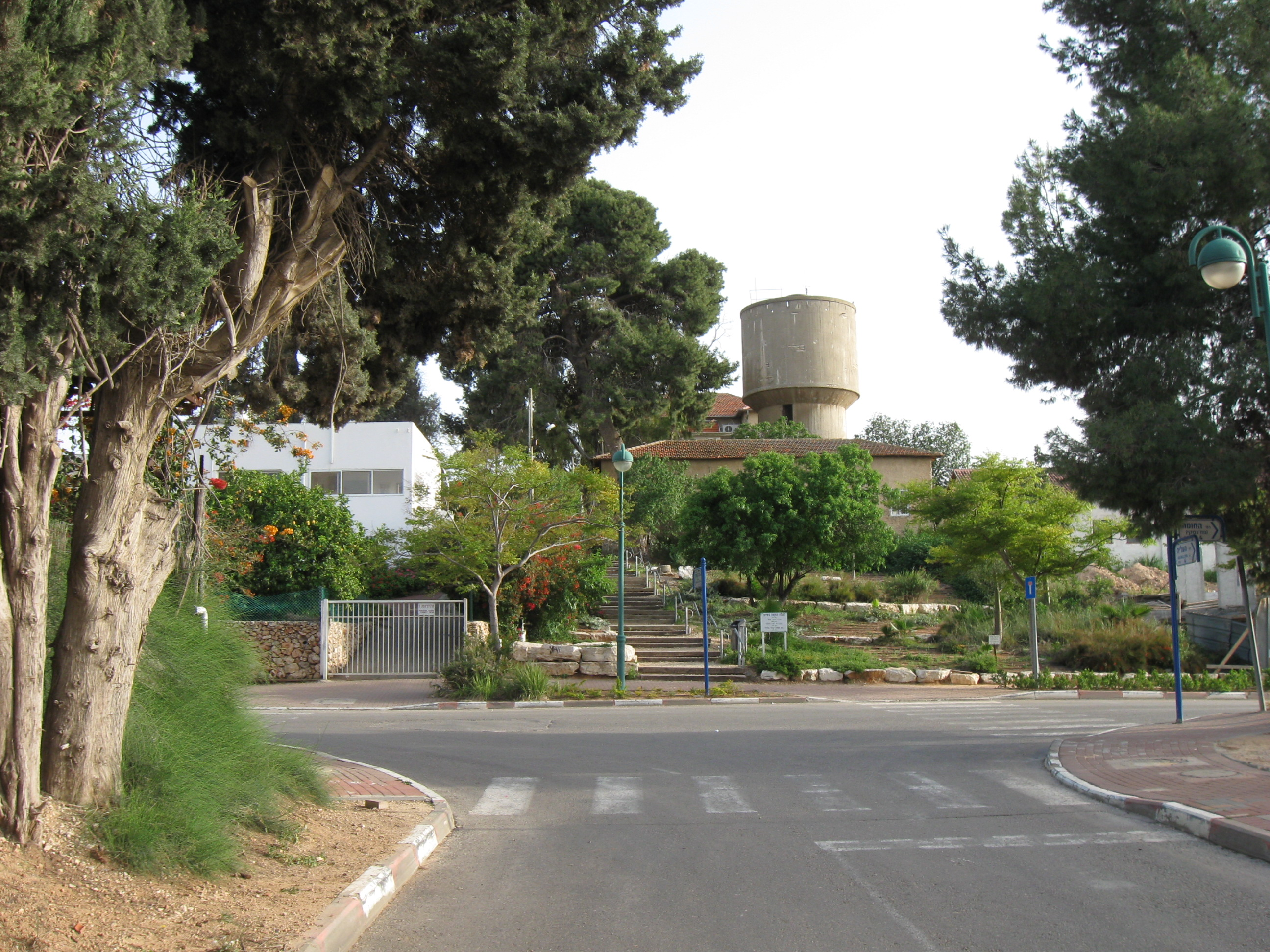
Gedera water tower

The land on which Gederah was established had once been owned by the Palestinians of Qatra, who had lost it due to debts. They were cultivating it as tenant farmers when the Jewish owners arrived and resented the intrusion onto what they still thought of as their land. According to another account, the land was actually owned by Qatra, but had been assigned by the government to the nearby village of Mughar when Qatra disclaimed ownership to avoid a certain murder charge. Mughar then sold it to Polivierre, who sold it to Pines. This, and the proximity of the two sites, led to poor relations between the communities that sometimes led to violent clashes. Israel Belkind, a member of Bilu, described Gedera's relationship with its Arab neighbors as among the worst in all the settlements. Haim Hissin, also a Bilu member, criticized the Arabs for their provocative behavior, but also blamed the Jews for being unfair and arrogant.

Qatra was depopulated by the Haganah on 17 May 1948.

In the 1950s, a neighborhood called Oriel ("light of God") was established for new immigrants with visual impairments. The immigrants worked in a sheltered workshop, and the neighborhood was specially planned to promote their independence.

On February 9, 2009, a Grad rocket fired from the Gaza Strip hit Gedera, marking the northernmost point in a round of 200 rockets targeting southern Israel.

== Geography ==
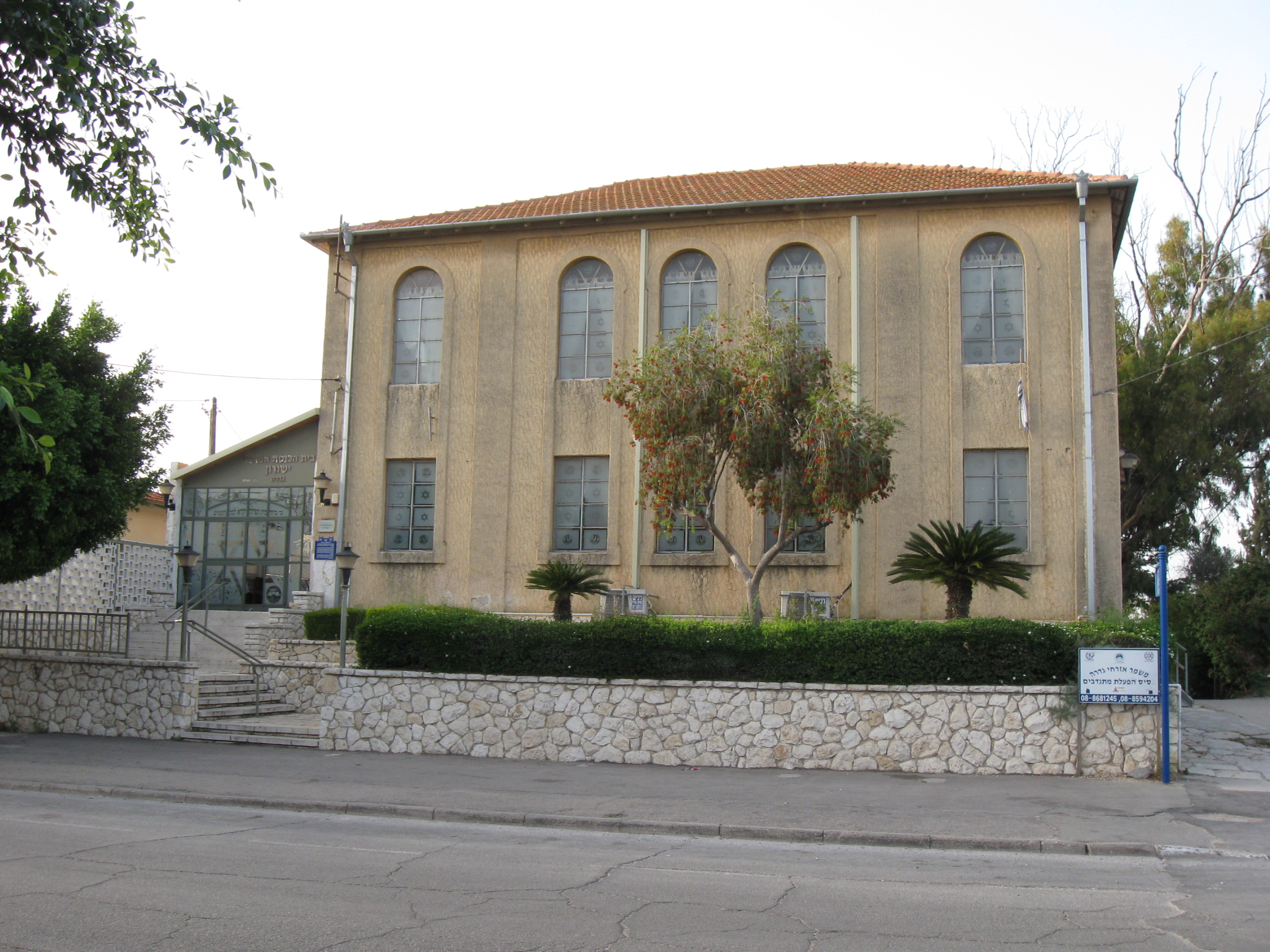
Yeshurun Central Synagogue, built in 1912

Gedera is built on seven hills in the Southern Coastal Plain which rise to the height of 80 metres (262 feet) above sea level. The town has an area of 14,500 dunams (14.5 square kilometres or 5.6 square miles). Gedera is considered to be the southern edge of central Israel while Hadera is considered the northern edge, hence the Israeli expression "from Hadera to Gedera" to describe the most populated area in Israel.

== Demography ==
Year	Population
1972	5,700
1983	6,400
1995	9,200
2008	20,100
2022	29,260
2024	31,389

In 1911, Gedera had a population of 140.

At the time of the 1922 census of Palestine, Gedera had a population of 140 inhabitants, consisting of 136 Jews and 4 Christians. The 1931 census, recorded 63 occupied houses and a population of 201 Jews and 7 Muslims. By 1945, the population had increased to an estimated 970 Jews.

Gedera today has a large population of Yemenite Jews. Most estimates put their population at 50% of Gedera, making it one of the few primarily Mizrahi towns in the Central District of Israel. In 2008, 1,700 Ethiopian Jews were living in Gedera.

== Economy ==
The principal agricultural branches of Gedera in its early years were grapes and grains. Citrus and other field crops were added later. In the 1930s, several industries were established, and the moshava became a vacation resort with convalescence and rest homes.

== Urban development ==
Gedera's position near the large south-central cities of Israel (Rehovot, Ashdod and Kiryat Gat), low prices for private homes and the fact that it is a green and quiet town yet it is in the central district near Tel Aviv and Jerusalem make it attractive to Israelis. Gedera is one of the faster-growing towns in Israel, with a 7.9% growth rate.

New Gedera is an upscale neighborhood built by the Azorim company. A major shopping venue built by Azorim is the Gedera Mall, located in the southeast of the town. First opened in September 2007, Gedera Mall has small businesses along with anchor tenants from semi-major department stores from Israel and Europe.

The major road Highway 7 was recently constructed alongside the border of Gedera, linking Gedera directly to Israel's cross-country highway, Highway 6.

== Landmarks ==
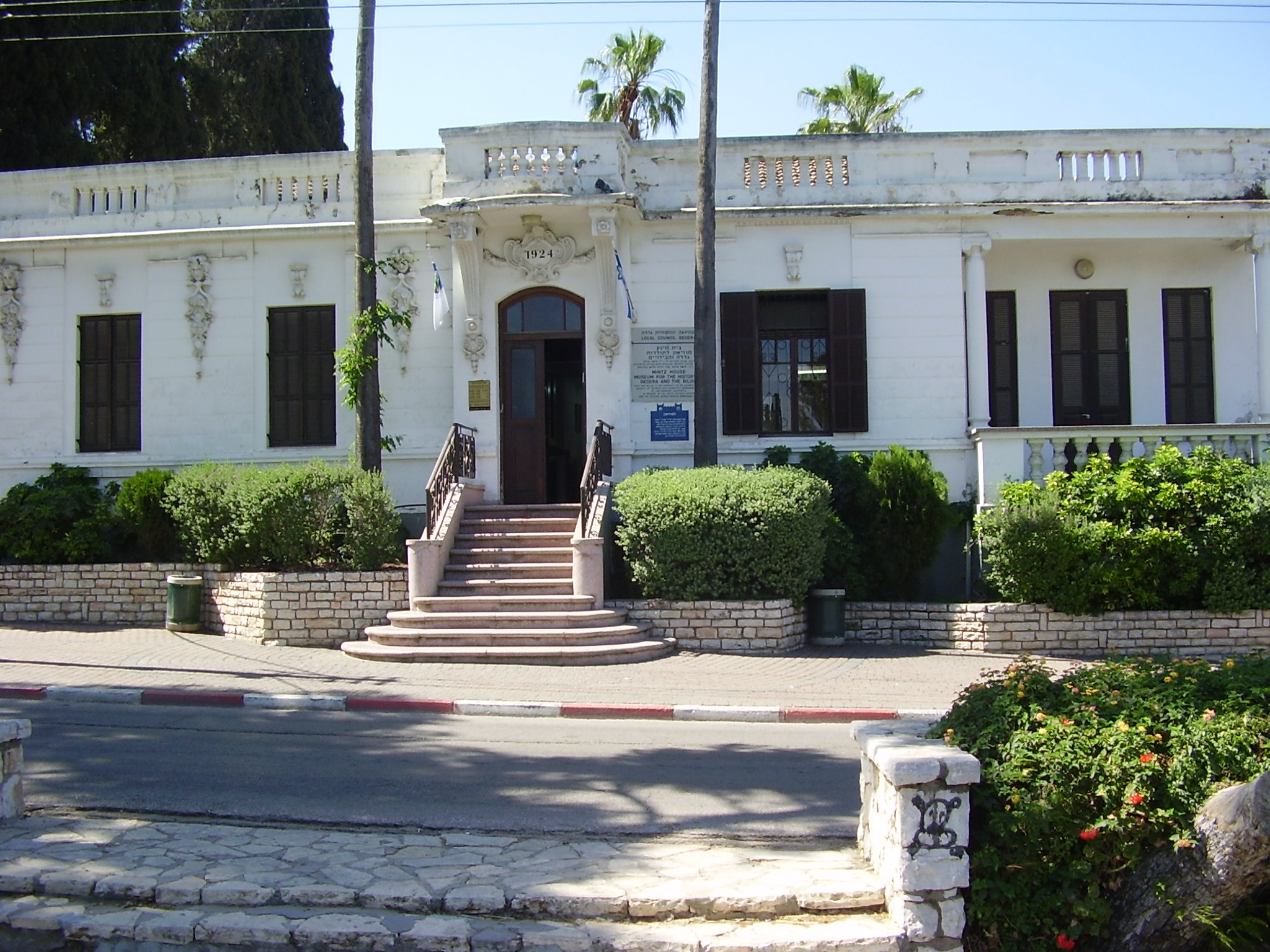
Beit Mintz, Bilu Museum

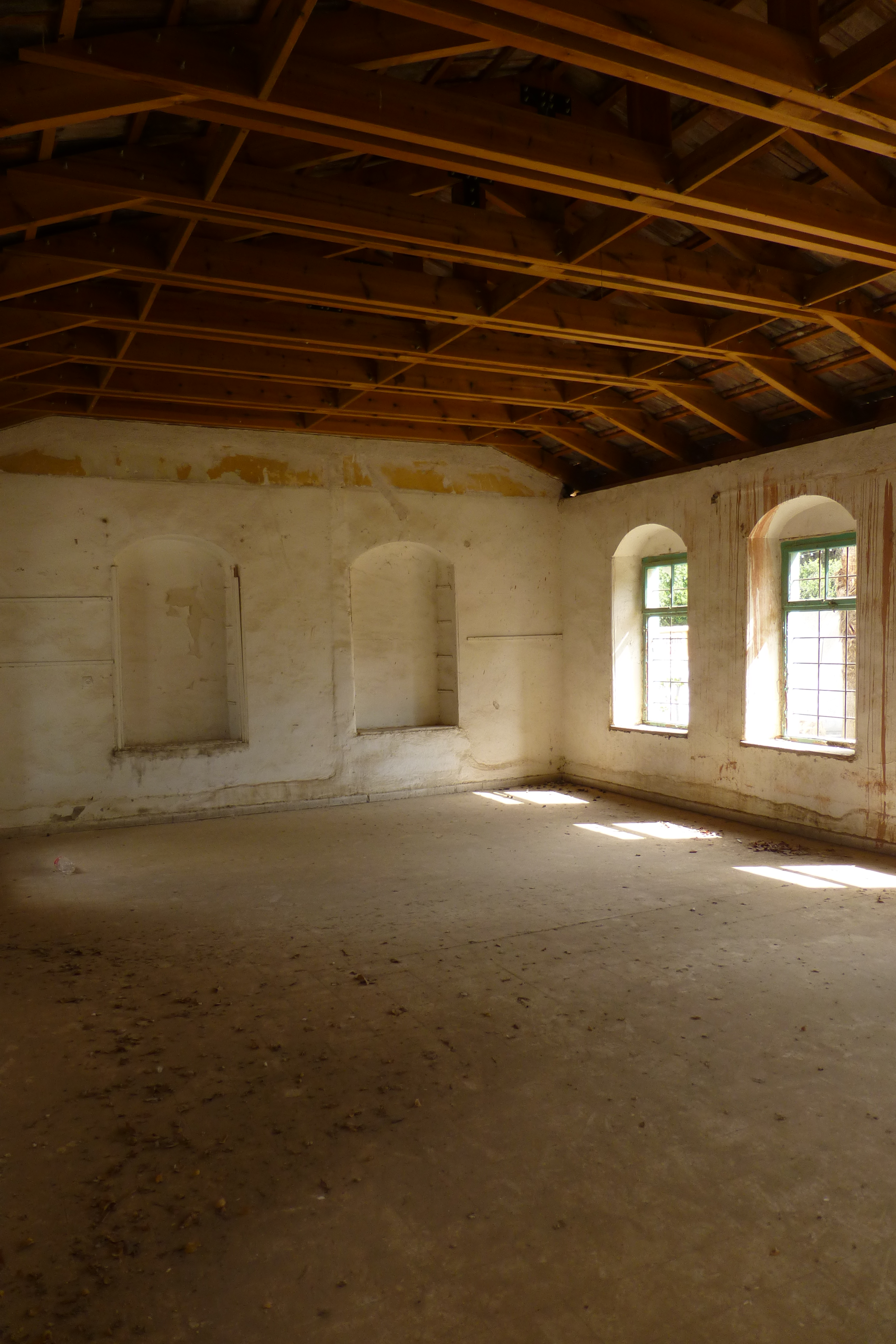
Beit Fuchs

The Museum of the History of Gedera and the Biluim is located in a restored historical building at the end of Biluim Street. Beit Mintz, built by Dr. Moshe Mintz, doubled as a residence (western wing) and communal hall (eastern side). When Mintz died in 1930, he bequeathed the house to the people of Gedera. The house was used as a concert hall, a wedding venue and a move theater. In the summer, films were screened in the courtyard. In 1986, it was dedicated as a museum in the presence of the Mintz family. A concrete monument entitled "Bereshit Bara" ("Genesis") by the Austrian artist Ernst Degasperi stands in a garden opposite the museum.

The Sverdlov Hut is the one remaining hut built by the Biluim. It belonged to Chana and Yigal Sverdlov, who later left it to the city. A bell used to call residents for public meetings is located in the front yard. In 1885, the pioneers dug a 20×4×2 meter hole and covered it with a roof to use as a stable. Today, it has been restored, and is known as "Bor HaBilu'im".

The first designated school building was built in 1896. Later, the building became "Beit HaIkar", the Farmer's House, a meeting place for the local farmers.

The 16.5 meter water tower behind Yeshurun Central Synagogue was built in 1935. The bottom floor was used as a classroom. The top floor held a water tank, and served as a watchtower.

A sculpture garden in Gedera showcases the work of Yoma Segev, who creates sculptures from scrap and recycled materials.

== Archaeology ==
A pottery workshop for the manufacture of Gaza Jars was discovered at Tel Qatra, an archaeological tel on the outskirts of Gedera. Gaza amphorae were used to ship wine and other foodstuffs across the Byzantine world.

== Voting Patterns ==
In the 2022 election, 52 percent of voters in Gedera voted for the parties of the right-wing coalition led by Benjamin Netanyahu, while 45 percent voted for the parties of the center-left coalition led by Yair Lapid and 0.1 percent voted for the Arab parties.

In the 2026 election, 47 percent of voters in Gedera voted for the parties of the center-left coalition led by Gadi Eisenkot, while 45 percent voted for the parties of the right-wing coalition led by Benjamin Netanyahu and 0.3 percent voted for the Arab parties. An additional 4.7 percent voted for the Reservists, and 2.4 percent voted for Amcha Yisrael. Voter turnout increased 23 percent from the 2022 election.

== Notable residents ==
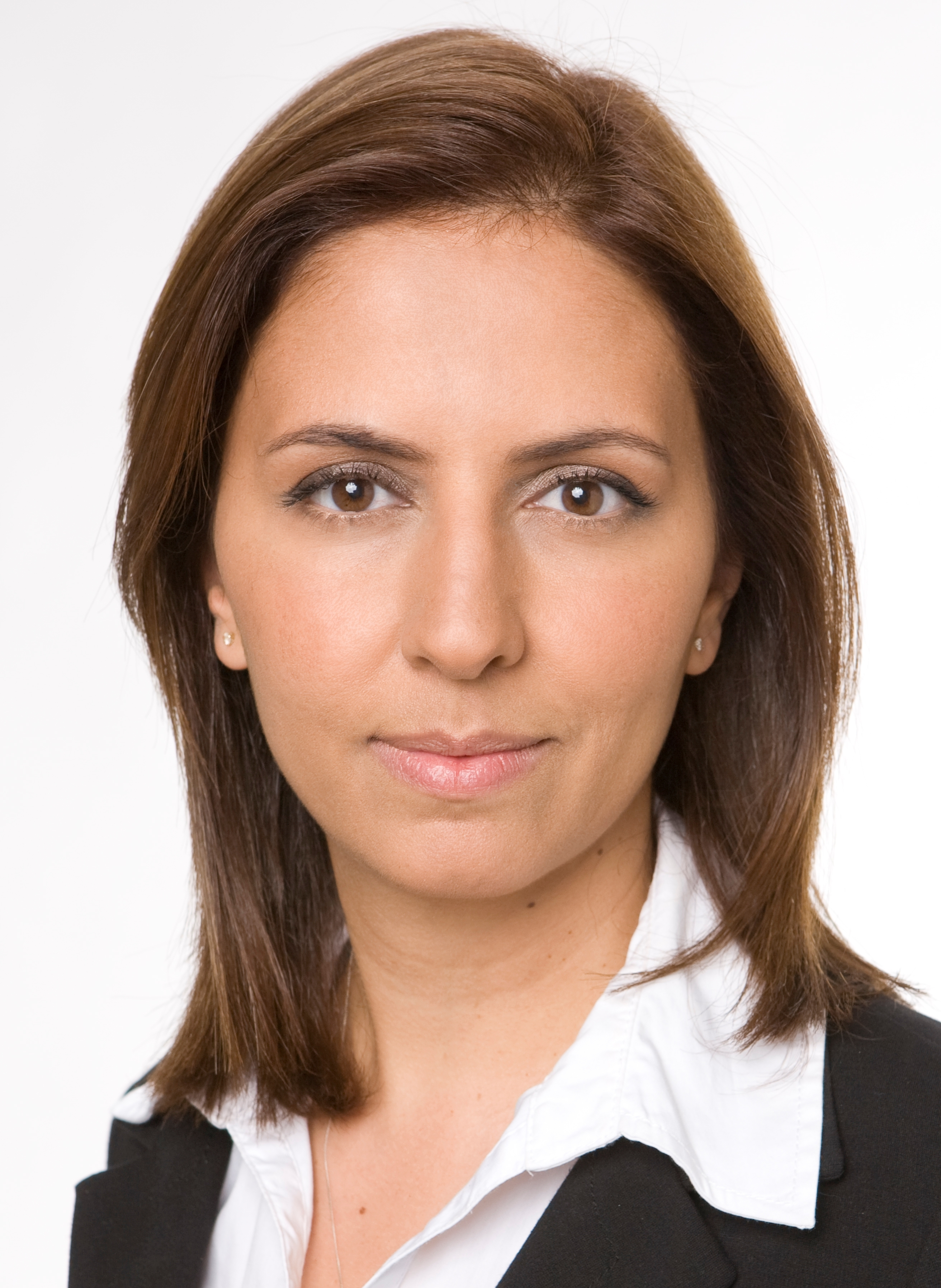
Gila Gamliel

- Gila Gamliel (born 1974), member of the Knesset for Likud and Deputy Minister in the Prime Minister's Office
- Moshe Kaplinsky (born 1957), army general and businessman
- Agi Mishol (born 1947), poet
- Avishag Semberg (born 2001), Olympic taekwondo bronze medalist

== International relations ==
=== Twin towns – Sister cities ===
Gedera is twinned with:

- Valence, France
- Roman, Romania

== See also ==
- Alisa Flatow
